= List of oilfield service companies =

This is a list of oilfield service companies – which provide services to the petroleum exploration and production industry but do not typically produce petroleum. In the list, notable subsidiary companies and divisions are listed as sub-lists of their current parent companies.

== Definition ==
Oilfield service companies may produce, maintain, and repair equipment used in oil extraction and oil transportation. In 2019, the global oilfield services market was US $ 267.8 billion.

== List ==
- ABB
- Abbot Group
- Acteon
- Aibel
- Aker Solutions
- Axis Energy Services
- Baker Hughes
- Ballycatter
- Calfrac Well Services
- Canary (formerly Frontier Energy Group)
- CGG
- China Oilfield Services
- Clough Group
- Core Laboratories
- Cyntech
- DCP Midstream Partners
- Diamond Offshore Drilling
- DOF Subsea
- Engineers India
- ESG Solutions
- Eversource Energy
- Expro
- Fairfield Geotechnologies
- Fern Communications
- Flowserve
- Fluor Corporation
- Fugro
- Gaia Earth Sciences
- Geokinetics
- Geophysical Service
- Gibson Energy
- GlobaLogix
- Grant Prideco
- Grup Servicii Petroliere
- Gyrodata
- Halliburton
- Helix Energy Solutions Group
- Helmerich & Payne
- Hill International
- Hunting
- Hytera
- ION Geophysical
- Jacobs Solutions
- Key Energy Services
- Larsen & Toubro
- McDermott International
- MODEC
- Nabors Industries
- Nalco Champion
- National Oilwell Varco
- Neuman & Esser
- Newpark Resources
- Noble Corporation
- Oceaneering International
- Oil and Gas International Fzc
- Odfjell Drilling
- OneSubsea
- Petrofac
- Petroleum Geo-Services
- PJP4
- Polarcus
- Precision Drilling
- Rosneft
- Saipem
- Sapura Energy
- SBM Offshore
- Schlumberger
- Schoeller-Bleckmann Oilfield Equipment
- Scomi
- Seaboard International
- Seadrill
- Shawcor
- Siemens
- Stewart & Stevenson
- Subsea 7
- Superior Energy Services
- Swire
- TAM International
- TechnipFMC
- Tecnicas Reunidas
- Tracerco
- Transocean
- Trican Well Service
- Trinidad Drilling
- Valaris
- Wasco Energy
- Weatherford International
- Weir Group
- Welltec
- Wood Group
- Worley

== Companies connected with oilfield services ==
- DeepOcean
- International Logging
- Kongsberg Gruppen
- Rolls-Royce Holdings
- Teledyne Technologies
- Wärtsilä

== See also ==
- List of oil exploration and production companies
- List of largest oil and gas companies by revenue
