= Patented track crane =

Type of crane

A patented track crane is a crane with a bottom flange of hardened steel and a raised tread to improve rolling.

== History ==
In 1867, William Louden was issued a patent for a hay carrier. Rerolled from old car rails, this system handled loads of approximately 250 pounds (110 kg) and was suspended by hairpin-shaped hanger rods nailed to the exposed barn rafters. There were a few industrial applications of this product during World War I, but Louden Machinery did not pursue the industrial applications after the war. Earl T. Bennington, an electric motor salesman, had installed some of the Louden systems during World War I. Realizing the sales potential of motor propelled systems, he convinced Cleveland Electric Tramrail to enter the industry. Two years later, a line of underhung cranes and monorails were developed and marketed by Cleveland Electric Tramrail. The company's rapid success in the industry caused Louden to re-enter the market they had created and previously abandoned.

In 1925, two Louden executives, J. P. Lawrence and Frank Harris, resigned from the company to form American Monorail Company. From 1923 to 1948, these three companies—Louden, Tramrail, and American—held a virtual oligopoly in the market of underhung cranes and monorails. In 1947, Spencer and Morris, Cleveland Tramrail's Southern California representative, was acquired by the Whiting Corporation. S&M had been Cleveland Tramrail's representative for 23 years, but had begun to manufacture equipment identical to Cleveland Tramrail's during World War II. Soon after in 1950, Spanmaster was created as a product of Angelus Engineering Corporation in South Gate, California.

In the late 1920s, Vern G. Ellen Company was formed as a dealer and installer of American Monorail Company Equipment. After the death of Ellen in 1957, the company was purchased by Frank Griswold, who ran the company in its purchased form until 1958, when he lost access to the American Monorail product line. On May 1, 1959, the Twin City Monorail Company was formed. In 1968, the assets of Twin City Monorail were sold to Dyson-Kissner Corporation, which operated Twin City Monorail until 1971, when they were acquired by Robbins & Myers. They were later purchased in March 1982 by Lague Enterprises, Inc. (LEI). In 1990, TC/American Monorail was formed by the merger of Twin City Monorail and American Monorail under the ownership of LEI. In October 1990, Spanmaster, a division of the Jervis B. Webb Company, was acquired and became part of TC/American Monorail.

== Characteristics ==
Patented track rails are engineered specifically for overhead cranes and monorails. Unlike a symmetrical structural rail, the material in a patented track rail is placed where it is most effective allowing for a significant reduction in weight. The rails are engineered to be twice as strong as typical A-36 structural beams and have a hardened, raised tread track, providing a longer life and reduced wear on the wheels. Utilizing patented track rails also significantly eases the installation process. The rails are inspected and straightened in factories, which reduces the need to manipulate the beams during installation and startup. In most cases, there is no welding involved in the installation process. All splices are joined with bolted splice joints. Also, rails are cut with a slight taper on the ends, which allows for tight joints at the bottom of a splice allowing for a smooth transition between beams. Patented track rails were also designed specifically to be supported from the building. Not requiring a duplicate structure or columns allows for increased flexibility when maneuvering material.

== Applications ==
Due to the strength, versatility, reliability, and prolonged life of the patented track rail, there are many applications where patented track rails are preferred over structural beams.
