= Bayut =

Real estate website in UAE

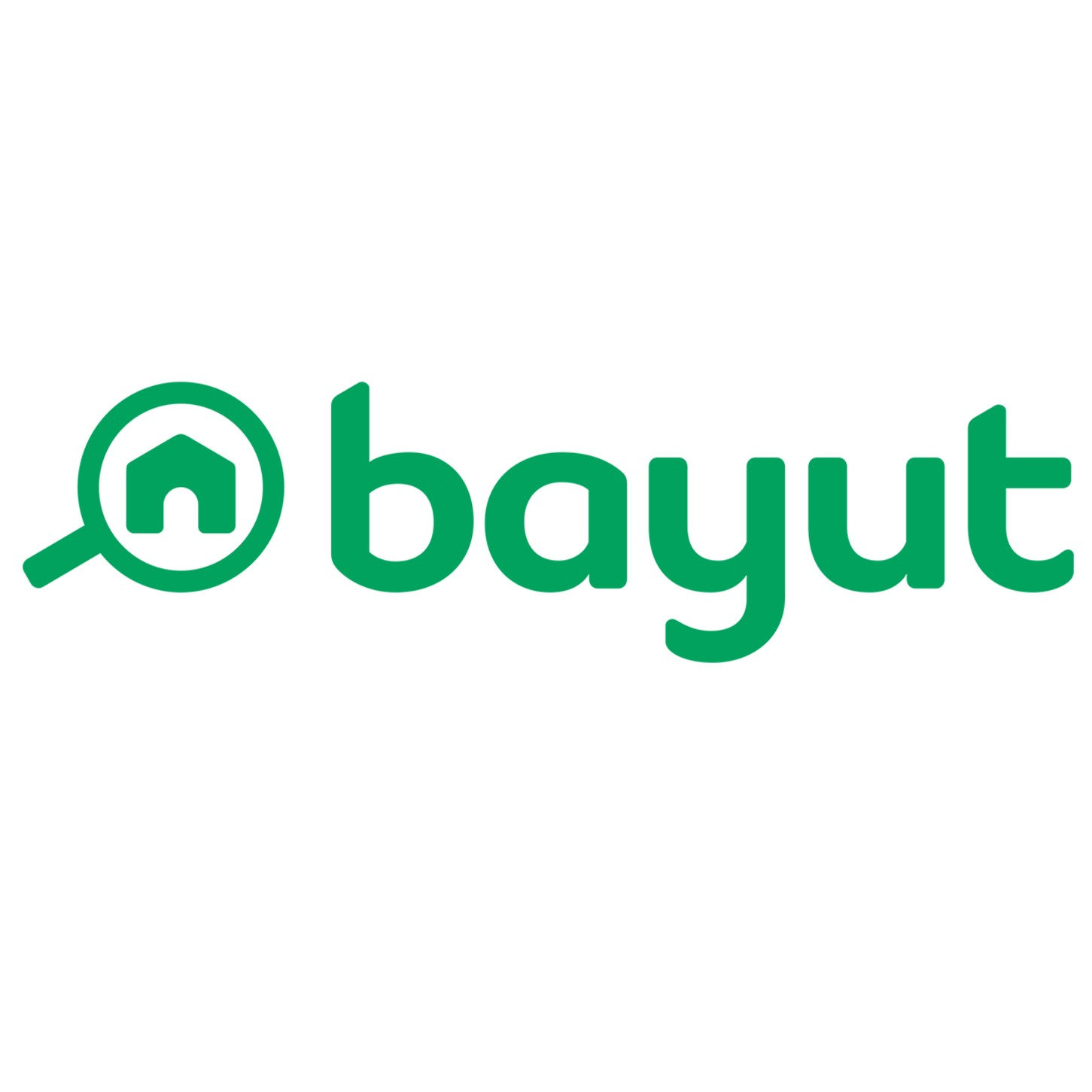
- Website type: Online property portal
- Available in: English, Arabic
- Founded: 2008; 18 years ago
- Headquarters: Dubai, United Arab Emirates
- CEO: Haider Khan
- Industry: Real Estate & Internet Marketing
- Employees: 200+
- Parent: Dubizzle Group (formerly EMPG)

Bayut is a property classifieds website in the United Arab Emirates. Bayut is a part of the Dubizzle Group, formerly known as Emerging Markets Property Group, which was the first homegrown unicorn in the Arab region.

== History ==
Bayut was founded in 2008.

In April 2020, Bayut's parent company and the Netherlands-based OLX Group announced the merger of their operations in the UAE, Egypt, Lebanon, Saudi Arabia, Kuwait, Qatar, Bahrain, Pakistan, and Oman, together with the OLX-owned Dubai-based classifieds website, Dubizzle.

In January 2022, the Dubai Land Department signed a memorandum of understanding with Bayut to provide Dubai’s real estate market with interactive data and reports.

== See also ==
- Polarcus
