= IntelliServ =

- Product type: Broadband network drill string system
- Introduced: 2009
- Website: https://www.nov.com/about/our-business-units/intelliserv

IntelliServ is a National Oilwell Varco brand that manufactures and sells a broadband networked drilling string system used to transmit downhole information to the surface in a drilling operation.

== Background ==
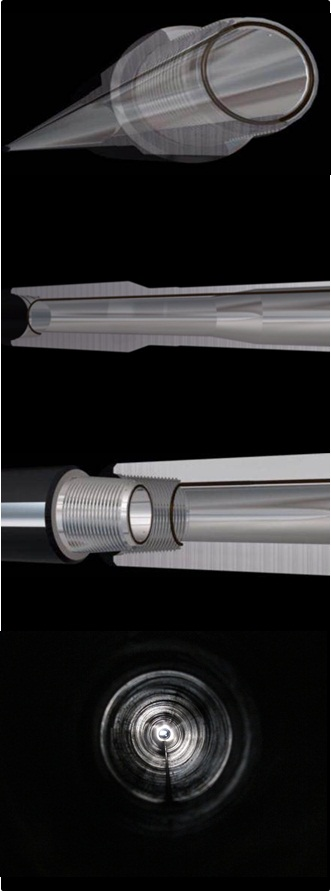
This series of photographs shows the coax cable and coil as the connection is made.

The IntelliServ network is a broadband telemetry system that allows instant transmission of data between the surface and the measurement tools positioned in the drill string bottom-hole assembly near the drill bit. IntelliServ originated in a 1997 project on hydraulic mud hammers sponsored by the company Novatek and the United States Department of Energy. The project addressed the need for instant transmission of downhole data (data acquired within the wellhole) through drill pipe, leading to Novatek's beginning on a networked drill pipe development project. In 2001, the National Energy Technology Laboratory (NETL) began providing funding for the drill pipe project and an additional drill pipe data transmission project.

in 2006, research resulted in the IntelliServ network and Intellipipe, a drill pipe with an embedded data cable. In 2005, Grant Prideco bought the IntelliServ technology and launched the first IntelliServ network. Grant Prideco was purchased by National Oilwell Varco (NOV) in 2008, and the NOV-IntelliServ joint venture was formed in 2009 with 55% National Oilwell Varco and 45% Schlumberger ownership.

The first commercial deployment of a drill string telemetry network occurred using IntelliServ's product in Myanmar in December 2006.

== Technology ==
The IntelliServ network components are embedded in drill string components, known as IntelliPipe, which transmit subsurface data at 57,000 bits per second. The IntelliServ network upgrade raised the speed to one million bits per second. The two-way data communication between downhole Measurement while drilling (MWD) and Logging while drilling (LWD) measurement tools and the operators at the surface allow the operators to command rotary-steering tools, or configure downhole tools such as the formation pressure testing tool or sonic tools.

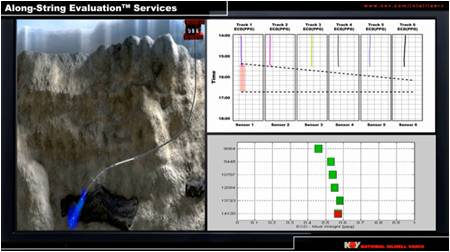
This image represents the driller's view of downhole information provided by the IntelliServ Broadband Network. The top right section shows the real-time pressure change as a weighted fluid sweeps the annulus and quantifies hole cleaning efficiency. The bottom image helps detect cutting pack-off.

The IntelliServ network includes measurement nodes along the full length of the drill string that allow operators to acquire data along the wellbore. The measurement nodes measure and transmit temperature and pressure data acquired along the drill string, which can improve well site efficiency and reduce risks associated with hole cleaning, such as pack offs. The transmission of information is not affected by the depth, formation resistivity, drilling fluid properties, or required flow of the well. Surface operating parameters can control items detected by the sensors, such as shock and vibration.

The networked drill pipe can transmit data acquired by most large service companies. As of March 2012, the system has been deployed on 90 wells totaling more than 1 million feet of drilling.

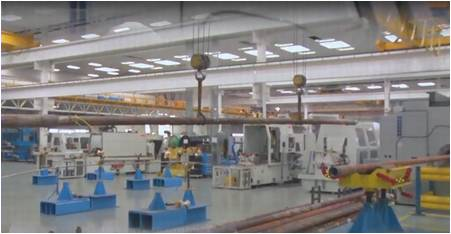
Inside of the IntelliServ facility in Provo, Utah.

== Notable Partners ==
IntelliServ partners with the following companies and organizations:

- Baker Hughes and Inteq since 2007
- Halliburton
- National Energy Technology Laboratory is a partner in the IntelliServ broadband network
- Schlumberger
- Weatherford International
