= QRM =

QRM may refer to:

- Amateur radio Q code for "I have interference"
- Qormi, Malta, postal code
- Quick Response Manufacturing
- US Quevilly-Rouen Métropole (QRM), a French football club
