= International Logging =

International Logging Incorporated
- Type: Public
- Industry: Oil and gas
- Founded: 1990 (merger)
- Headquarters: Headquarters in Houston. Operates worldwide
- Products: Oilfield services & equipment

International Logging Inc. was an oilfield mud logging services company.

== Background ==
The company provided the world's oil and gas industry with products and services for mud logging: Well Wizard, Drill Logic System, Well Wizard Integrated Data System, Drilling Optimization Consultant, Wellhub, Gas Chromatograph, GC Tracer, Early Detection H2S, Consulting Services, Kick Detection, Hole Stability and Vibration Detection Services. International Logging Inc. operated worldwide, mainly based in countries with a mature petroleum industry, as is the case with most oil and gas service companies.

The company headquarters were in Houston, Texas, and the company had major offices around the world.

== Weatherford Purchase ==
Weatherford International bought International Logging Inc. on August 18, 2008.

== See also ==
- List of oilfield service companies
