= Daifuku (company) =

Japanese material-handling equipment company

Daifuku Co., Ltd.
- Native name: 株式会社ダイフク
- Type: Public (K.K)
- Traded as: TYO: 6383
- ISIN: JP3497400006
- Industry: Machinery
- Founded: May 20, 1937; 89 years ago in Osaka, Japan
- Headquarters: Nishiyodogawa-ku, Osaka 555-0012, Japan
- Area served: Worldwide
- Key people: Tomoaki Terai (President and CEO)
- Products: Material handling systems and equipment; Baggage handling systems; Vehicle washers; Industrial personal computers
- Revenue: ¥660.724 billion (2025)
- Net income: ¥78.096 billion (2025)
- Number of employees: 11,417 (consolidated, 31 December 2025)
- Subsidiaries: Jervis B. Webb Company (USA); Wynright (USA); BCS Group (New Zealand)
- Website: Official website

Daifuku Co., Ltd. (株式会社ダイフク, Kabushiki-gaisha Daifuku) is a Japanese material-handling equipment company, founded in 1937, in Osaka.

== Name origin ==
It was founded as Sakaguchi Kikai Seisakusho Ltd., and renamed to Kanematsu Kiko in 1944 then Daifuku Machinery Works Co., Ltd. in 1947. Its modern name Daifuku Co., Ltd. has been used since 1984.

The company name consists of two parts: Dai is one of the names for the character 大, and refers to Osaka (大阪市); fuku refers to Fukuchiyama, Kyoto, which was its second production location at the time.
