= Glenrinnes distillery =

Gin distillery near Keith, Scotland

Glenrinnes Distillery

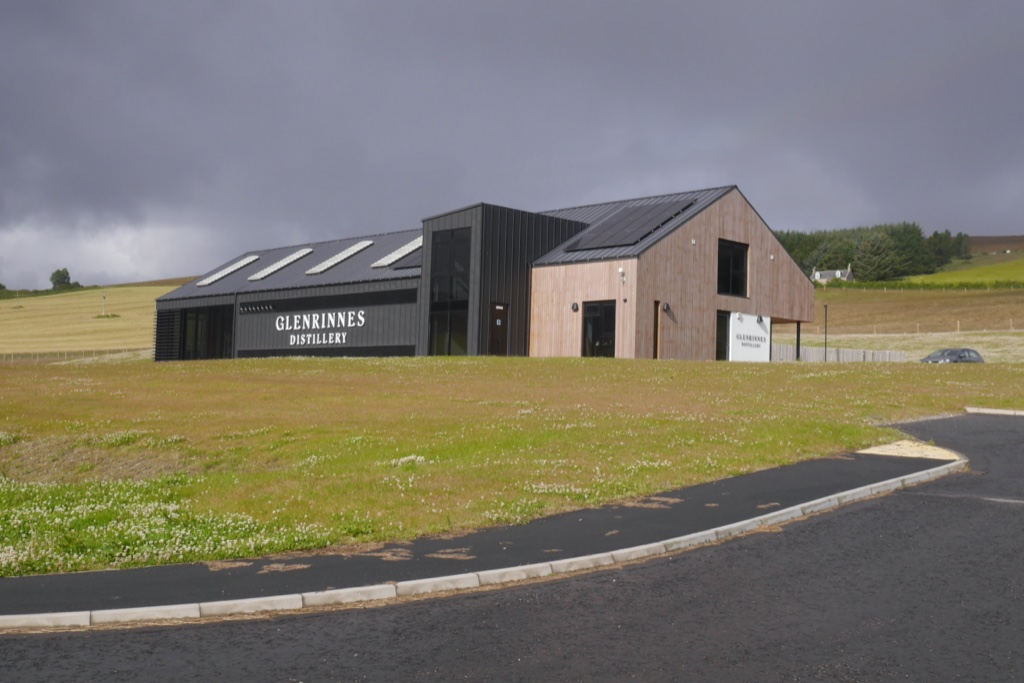
- Location: Glenrinnes, Keith, Banffshire, AB55 4DB, Scotland, United Kingdom
- Coordinates: 57.383205°N 3.222164°W
- Owner: Glenrinnes Distillery Ltd.
- Founded: 2018; 8 years ago
- Founder: Alex Christou; Alasdair Locke
- Status: Operational
- Water source: Clashmarloch spring
- No. of stills: 1 x 1000 litre pot still 2 x 10-plate column stills
- Website: www.glenrinnes.com

Glenrinnes distillery is a gin and vodka distillery near Keith, Scotland. The site was founded in 2018 and was named after Ben Rinnes, a nearby landmark. The area around the distillery, Speyside, is historically known for whisky, rather than gin, production.

Products from the distillery are released under the brand name Eight Lands, a reference to the eight counties which can be seen from the peak of Ben Rinnes.

== History ==
The distillery was founded by Alasdair Locke and Alex Christou in 2019. Locke had previously founded oil and gas company Abbot Group, and purchased the Glenrinnes Estate in 1993. Locke and Christou had previously worked together as property developers in Edinburgh. The inspiration for building a distillery came from seeing Scottish water promoted in London; the decision was made to find a use for the Clashmarloch spring on the estate.

The distillery has a 1000-litre pot still, nicknamed Rebecca, two column stills, and its own bottling plant.

Overseas export began in 2020, with the signing of an agreement with the Société des alcools du Québec.

== Products ==
The first products from the distillery, Eight Lands Gin and Eight Lands Vodka, were launched in June 2019.. The gin uses ten botanicals, including cowberries and sorrel sourced from the Glenrinnes Estate, and is made using a combination of spirit from the column and pot stills. The distillery released a barrel-aged vodka in 2022.

Both the gin and vodka from the distillery are certified organic; the farm at Glenrinnes received organic certification in 2001.

Eight Lands Gin was recognised as "Best in Class" at the 2024 San Francisco World Spirits Competition.

== See also ==
- List of distilleries in Scotland
