= Trican Well Service =

Trican Well Service Ltd.
- Company type: Public company
- Traded as: TSX: TCW
- Industry: Oilfield Services
- Founded: April 11, 1979; 47 years ago
- Headquarters: Calgary, Alberta, Canada
- Key people: Brad Fedora, CEO
- Revenue: $972.7 million (Q2 2024)
- Net income: $29 million (Q2 2024)
- Total assets: $710 million (Q2 2024)
- Total equity: $1 billion (Q2 2024)
- Website: www.tricanwellservice.com

Trican Well Service Ltd. is a provider of oilfield services, including acidizing, coiled tubing, fracturing, nitrogen pumping, and cementing. It is headquartered in Calgary, Alberta, Canada, with operations in Alberta, British Columbia and Saskatchewan.

== History ==
Trican Well Service was founded on April 11, 1979. Until 1997, it primarily operated in the Lloydminster, Alberta area and the Kindersley, Saskatchewan area.

In December 1996, the company became a public company and changed its management.

In January 2013, the company acquired i-TEC Well Solutions.

In 2015, the company sold its Russian operations to Rosneft for $197 million. It also suspended operations in Australia, Algeria, Saudi Arabia, and Colombia to cut costs. In 2016, the company sold its United States hydraulic fracturing business to Keane Group.

In June 2017, the company acquired Canyon Technical Services.

== See also ==
- List of oilfield service companies
