= Jervis B. Webb Company =

- Company type: Privately owned
- Industry: Material handling
- Founded: 1919
- Founder: Jervis Bennett Webb
- Headquarters: Novi, Michigan, United States
- Area served: Worldwide
- Key people: Susan M. Webb
- Products: Automatic guided vehicles, conveyors, baggage handling systems, and Automated Storage and Retrieval Systems
- Services: Engineering
- Number of employees: 1,000
- Parent: Daifuku Co., Ltd.
- Website: http://www.daifuku.com/us/

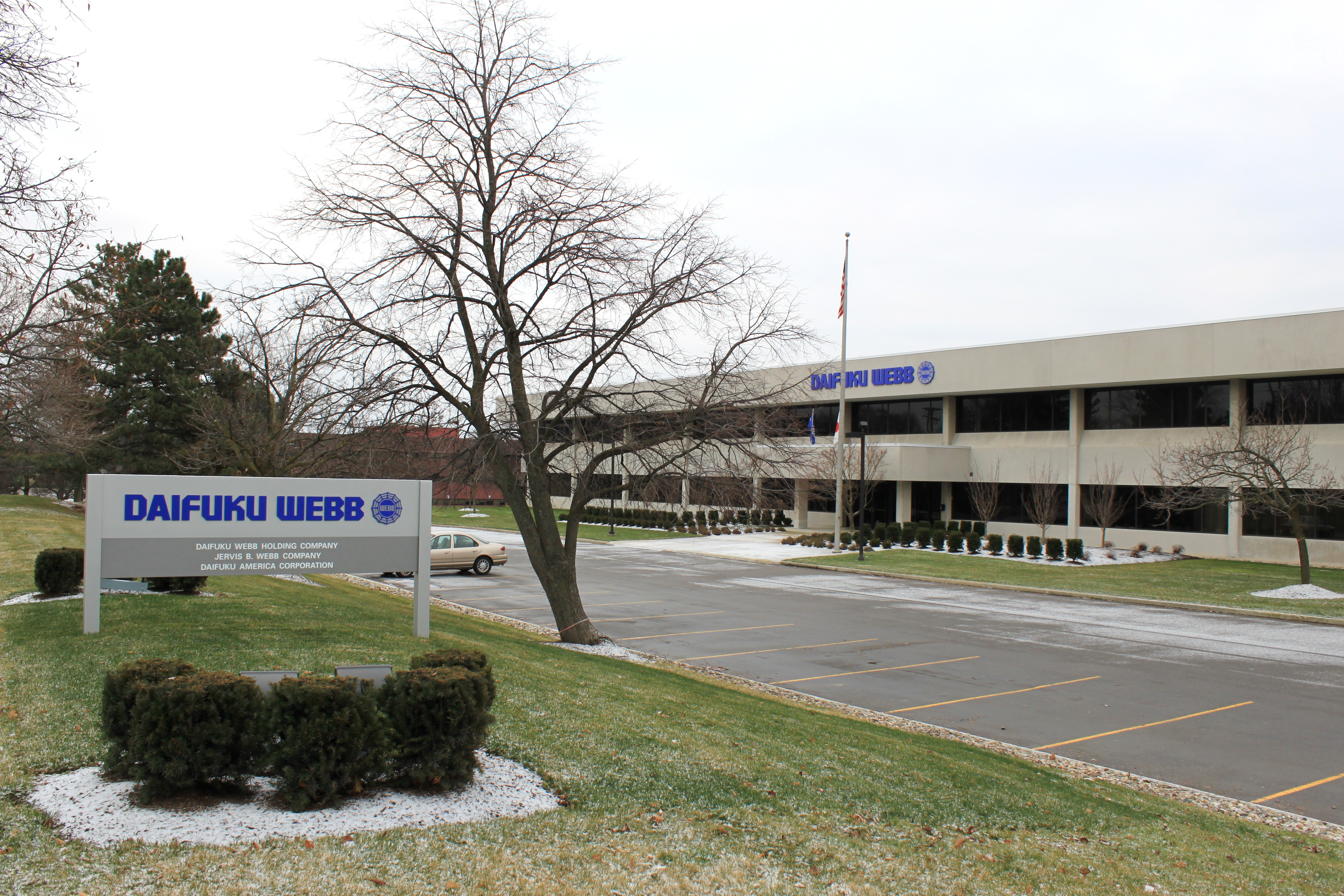
Jervis W. Webb's old headquarters building, Farmington Hills

Jervis B. Webb Company is a global company that designs, engineers, installs and supports integrated material handling systems such as baggage handling systems, Automatic Guided Vehicles (AGVs), conveyor systems and Automated Storage and Retrieval Systems (AS/RS). Webb is a subsidiary of Daifuku Co., Ltd.

The company headquarters is in Novi, Michigan, with offices and manufacturing plants internationally.

== Acquisitions ==
- Logan Teleflex, 2011
- Elite Line Services, 2013

== Patents ==
- U.S. Patent No. 7,991,521 for its Variable Path for Automated Guided Vehicle
- U.S. Patent No. 7,980,808 for its Automatic Transport Loading System and Method
