= Dan K. Eberhart =

American businessman

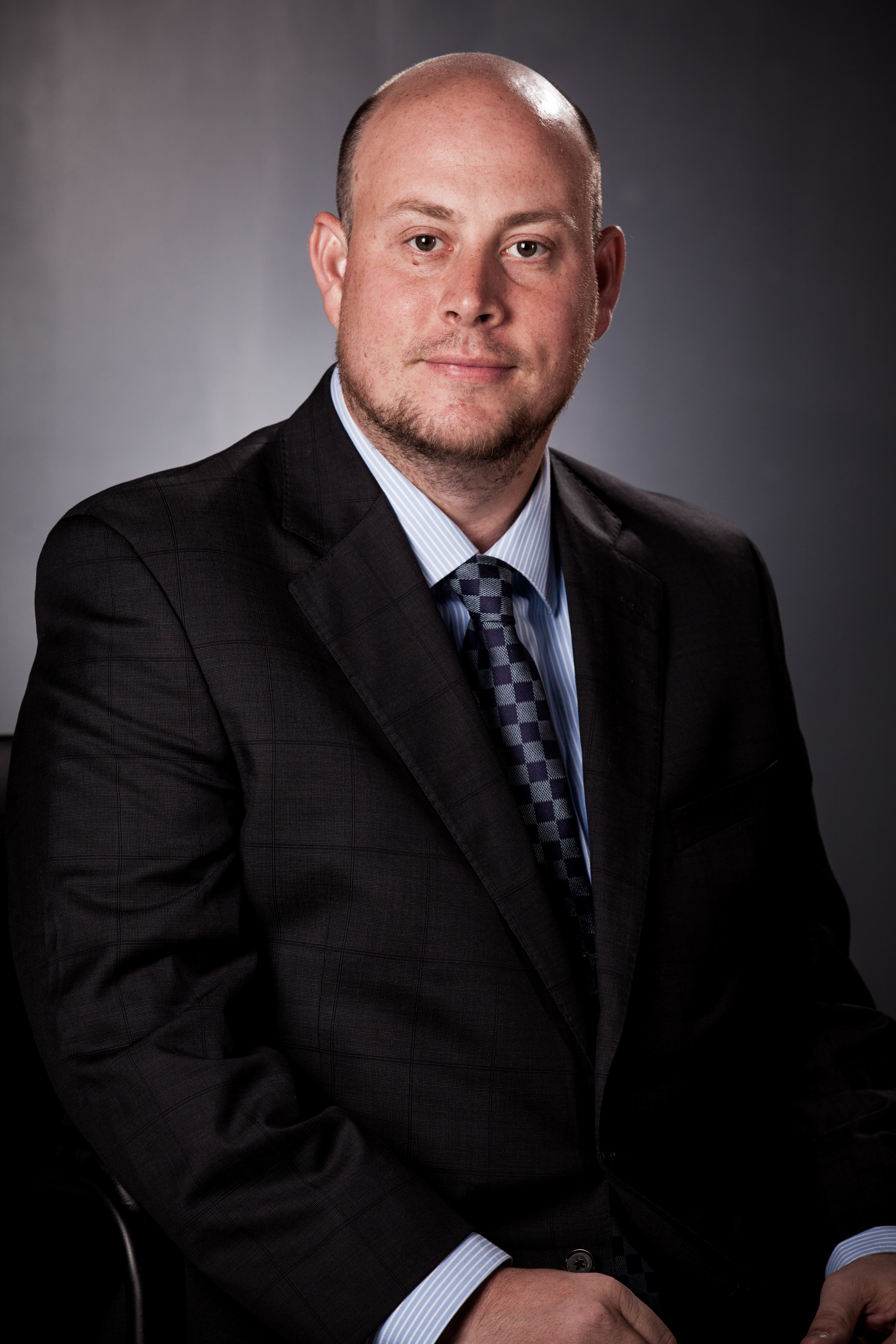
- Eberhart in 2013
- Born: October 22, 1979 (age 47); Georgia, US
- Education: Vanderbilt University
- Occupations: Managing partner of Eberhart Capital; CEO of Canary, LLC
- Known for: Oilfield services management

Dan K. Eberhart (born October 22, 1979) is the former chief executive officer of Canary, LLC, a Denver, Colorado-based drilling-services company, and managing partner of Eberhart Capital, LLC.

== Background and education ==
Eberhart is a native of Georgia and holds a degree in economics and political science from Vanderbilt University and a Juris Doctor from Tulane Law School, where he was president of the Tulane Federalist Society. He moved from New Orleans, Louisiana to Phoenix, Arizona, after graduating from law school and working for just three weeks before Hurricane Katrina hit.

== Personal life ==
He was formerly married to Abigail Eberhart, public information officer for the Town of Fort Myers Beach.

== Career ==
Eberhart's company, Canary, installs and services wellheads at drilling locations across the continental United States. Eberhart's private equity firm, Eberhart Capital, LLC, has been involved in a total of 12 acquisitions since 2007, from several different sectors of the economy, primarily in the oil and gas industry.

Eberhart got his start as an entrepreneur when he left his job at a Houston-based international oilfield service company and purchased Frontier Wellhead & Supply Co. in January 2009. From 2009 to 2012, he added seven acquisitions of oilfield services companies to Frontier.

In January 2013, he purchased Oklahoma City, Oklahoma-based rival, Canary Wellhead Equipment Inc., for less than $100 million. The combined Frontier Wellhead and Canary Wellhead is headquartered in Denver, Colorado, and operates under the name Canary, LLC. The company has annual revenue of $100 million. Eberhart serves as CEO. The company is now the sixth-largest privately owned oilfield service company and the largest independent wellhead service provider in the United States.

Before he purchased Frontier Wellhead, Eberhart was the vice president of acquisitions for Greene's Energy Group, LLC. He also served as Vice President of Acquisitions for Greene's Energy Group, LLC.

Eberhart's investment company, Eberhart Capital, LLC, owns Canary and his other companies. Its acquisitions include Unitherm Furnaces, LLC, a Missouri-based industrial furnace maker acquired in January 2014. Eberhart Capital also owns Precision Pipeline, Inc., and Twin Express trucking. The company previously owned Luft Machine, a manufacturing company. In July 2014, Eberhart acquired Contractor Sales and Services, an industrial construction equipment rental company based in Des Moines, Iowa.

Eberhart Capital is based in Scottsdale, Arizona, and has more than $100 million in assets and $200 million in revenue.

== Public advocacy ==
Eberhart's oil and gas expertise and manufacturing experience has landed him a spot on several U.S. trade missions, including visits to Mozambique, Ghana, and Nigeria. He has served as an oil and gas industry consultant in North America, Asia, and Africa, earning him a place in Hart Energy's “30 Under 40” list.

Eberhart's knowledge of geopolitical energy issues and oil prices has led to CNN, Fox News, and CNBC interviews, among other news outlets. He is a regular contributor to Forbes and a frequent guest on national and regional talk radio. Eberhart's commentaries on energy dominance and the economy have appeared in The New York Times, The Hill, The Economist, Washington Examiner, and other major publications. Eberhart is author of The Switch, a 2015 exploration of the potential economic and geopolitical benefits to the United States of achieving a greater energy self-sufficiency due to hydraulic fracturing and horizontal drilling.

In 2015, Eberhart was a leading advocate for lifting the ban on U.S. domestic crude oil exports. He co-authored an op-ed column with Tom Ridge, former Governor of Pennsylvania and First U.S. Secretary of Homeland Security, on the geopolitical value of expanding U.S. crude exports as a foreign policy tool. Eberhart was frequently quoted in the media when the ban was lifted.

In 2020, Eberhart wrote Switching Gears, a nonfiction book discussing the benefits and disadvantages of electric vehicles compared to internal combustion vehicles.

== Political activity ==
Eberhart is a major donor to the Republican Party and to conservative causes. He was a major contributor to the election campaigns of U.S. Senators Cory Gardner (R-CO), James Lankford (R-OK), and Congressman Kevin Cramer (R-ND). He also donated the individual maximum to the Donald Trump campaign. He was a prominent supporter of the Trump Victory rule change, allowing ultra-wealthy donors to increase their cap on campaign donations to Trump's reelection campaign and stating, "(Trump's) ability to accept the mega MAGA check is another nail in the eventual Democratic nominee’s coffin — and it’s a big nail." He later called Trump "divisive" and urged for a "unifier in chief," though has been highly critical of President Joe Biden and others in his cabinet, such as Pete Buttigieg.

== Organizations ==
Eberhart is a member of the North Dakota Petroleum Council and the Colorado Oil & Gas Association. He is also a director at the Los Angeles World Affairs Council.
