= TAM International =

TAM International, Inc. is a privately held oilfield services company with headquarters in Houston, Texas. TAM manufactures products and provides services used in drilling and completions, well intervention, unconventional resources, and reservoir optimization. L. Bentley Sanford is the chairman and Michael Machowski is the President.

== History ==
TAM was incorporated in 1968, in Houston, Texas, as a manufacturer of inflatable packer elements under the name TAM Products, Inc. In 1972, the present owners purchased the company. In 1973, they changed the company name to TAM International, Inc. In 1974, the company added field service tools to its product line. In 1979, TAM developed the Casing Annulus Packer (CAP) product line for annular gas migration control.

In 1981, TAM developed a hydrological test tool for use in modeling the various aquifers at the Hanford Nuclear Site in Washington. The tool was a multiple packer configuration that allowed selective open hole testing of a distinct test interval. In addition, short intervals were isolated above and below to allow pressure monitoring to verify isolation within the test interval. Accurate pressure and temperature gauges were included in each interval with surface readout via mono conductor wireline attached to the work string.

Successful operations at Hanford led to the development of larger tools for use in the Nevada Test Site, Mercury, Nevada, where extensive testing of various strata and aquifers was performed in evaluation of fluid movement to qualify the site for possible high level radioactive waste materials storage. Similar tools were utilized in the Carlsbad, New Mexico site and used to qualify that site for storage of low level radioactive waste materials such as received from medical applications.

With the overview of these sites by the USGS, an extensive effort was made in using open hole straddle test tools by the USGS Earthquake Studies group in Menlo Park, California. The stress testing technique was developed with the assistance of a variety of scientific organizations to better understand earth stresses and how these tests might help in prediction of earthquakes.

In an attempt to better understand plate tectonics, permanent installations were installed by the USGS near the San Andreas Fault onshore California as well as in deep water offshore areas of interest such as Washington, Hawaii, Japan, Costa Rica and other areas around the world. These multiple zone isolated and monitored installations were installed in water depths greater than 10,000’ through the Ocean Drilling Program, managed by Texas A&M University.

== Business Operations ==
TAM manufactures inflatable and swellable packers and related downhole equipment. In 2013, TAM completed construction of a 126,000 square foot manufacturing facility in Houston. TAM received a Leadership in Energy and Environmental Design (LEED) Silver certification for the new construction in 2014. The U.S. Green Building Council (USGBC) administers the LEED rating system. TAM maintains regional offices in Calgary, Canada; Aberdeen, Scotland; Dubai, UAE; Perth, Australia; and Bogota, Colombia.

== See also ==
List of oilfield service companies
