= Fern Communications =

British two-way radio communications equipment supplier

Fern Communications Ltd is a United Kingdom-based supplier of two-way radio communications equipment. It specialises in the design and manufacture of communications systems for the international upstream oil and gas industry, the emergency services sector and the Offshore Wind sector. With its primary headquarters in Suffolk, England, the company also operates from a facility in Aberdeen, Scotland.

== Overview ==
As a developer and supplier of two-way radio communications equipment, Fern produces systems that maintain continuous radio communication, regardless of location. Every field trial conducted with FRX-1 and FRW-1 systems has resulted in significant improvements in maintaining a continuous radio signal. For example, successful trials were conducted for Technip in the Gulf of Mexico, QServ in the North Sea, and Qatargas offshore Qatar.

To provide a means of communicating in tunnels greater than one kilometre long, the company began developing the FRW-XB Crossband Repeater. The system is currently in the final phases of testing, and is scheduled for release in 2012.

== History ==
Established in 2002, the company was co-founded by Managing Director Jennifer Cushion, an Australian electronics engineer, and Technical Director Clive Cushion, a British industrial product designer.

In 2007, Fern Communications introduced the oil and gas industry to the FRX-1 ATEX portable radio repeater, its flagship communications system, The FRX-1 provides consistent, uninterrupted radio communication, which is critical to the safe and efficient delivery of well services, especially offshore. Unfortunately, standard radio systems are extremely vulnerable to ‘black spots.’ Typically, these are solid structures that make up the platform and block radio signals, making it impossible for the targeted receiving radio to receive the signal. The upshot is that radio communications consistently break down in certain areas. In an effort to solve this problem, Fern Communications developed the FRX-1 radio repeater. It remains the only system of its kind that effectively bends the radio signal around a solid structure so that it reaches its target destination: the receiving radio located on the other side of the structure. The FRX-1 provides reliable two-way radio communication, which improves productivity, and enhances health and safety standards.

The FRX-1 is exported for use offshore to oil services companies operating in the United States, Qatar, Norway, Kazakhstan, Iran, Sweden, The Netherlands, Nigeria, Angola, Belgium, Bulgaria, Ukraine, Poland, Brunei and Hong Kong, amongst others.

Having established itself in the oil and gas industry, in 2009 Fern Communications identified the emergency services sector as a niche market for its radio communications systems. The company began conducting a number of field trials for fire and rescue organisations in mountain tunnels, subsea bunkers, rail tunnels and high rise buildings in Taiwan, England and Norway. Each trial conducted was a success, with every rescue organisation reporting that for the first time they experienced no breakdown in radio communications.

Later that year, the company introduced the FRW-1, the all-weather, waterproof version of the FRX-1. The system is now a standard component of radio communications equipment for a number of emergency services organisations and oil services companies in Taiwan, the United Kingdom and Norway.

The company continued to expand into new geographic markets. In 2011, Fern conducted field trials with the FRX-1 for the first time in Romania. The trials, which were carried out in water tunnels on behalf of a water company in Bucharest, demonstrated improvement in radio communications. Soon thereafter, the organisation purchased several systems and Fern Communications appointed a distributor to represent the company in Romania.

== See also ==
- List of oilfield service companies
