= Nalco Champion =

American chemical company

Nalco Champion, An Ecolab Company
- Type: Subsidiary
- Industry: Oil industry
- Founded: April 10, 2013
- Defunct: 2020
- Fate: Merged
- Successor: ChampionX
- Key people: Darrell Brown (President)
- Parent: Ecolab
- Website: www.ecolab.com/nalco-champion

Nalco Champion was an American supplier of specialty chemicals and related services to all areas of the petroleum industry. It had corporate offices in Houston and Sugar Land, Texas. It was a subsidiary of Ecolab.

== History ==
The company was formed following the acquisition of Champion Technologies by Ecolab, the parent company of Nalco Holding Company, on April 10, 2013.

In 2011, Nalco was the chemical dispersant supplier during the Deepwater Horizon BP oil spill. They were confronted by the EPA regarding the chemical harm that their product, Corexit, would have on the Gulf environment. Nalco refused to release the formula of their product.

In December 2013, the company announced plans to construct a new facility in Sugar Land.

In 2018, the company opened a plant in Argentina.

In 2020, completed the merge with Apergy create the new company ChampionX, as a result of the SpinOff with Ecolab.

== See also ==
- List of oilfield service companies
