= Key Energy Services =

American oilfield services company

- Company type: Private
- Industry: Oilfield services
- Founded: 1977
- Headquarters: Houston, Texas; United States
- Products: Well services, fishing and rental services, Coiled Tubing, Fluid Management
- Number of employees: 1000-5000 worldwide
- Website: www.keyenergy.com

Key Energy Services is an American oilfield services company.

== Background ==
The company, established in 1977, provides well services and is based in Houston, Texas with other offices in Midland, Texas and regional offices in Bakersfield, California; Farmington, New Mexico; Casper, Wyoming; El Reno, Oklahoma; Fort Lupton and Grand Junction, Colorado; Lafayette and Shreveport, Louisiana; and Arnoldsburg, West Virginia. Key has over 175 service locations (known as “districts”) in the US. Globally, Key Energy Services has operations in the Middle East, Russia, Mexico, Colombia and Ecuador.

== Business Segments ==
Service offerings include:

Rig Services
Rig-based well-servicing for workover or re-entries on existing wells, such as:

- New well completions
- PNA (Plug and Abandonment)
- Stimulation of existing wells with declining production
- Horizontal or directional drilling
- SmartTong^{sm} Rod Connection Service

Fluid Management Services
Oilfield transportation services (often referred to as “Trucking”)

Fishing Services
Process to recover lost or stuck equipment in the well bore utilizing a "fishing tool” or “jar”. The FRS operations also cut windows in well sidewall casings for horizontal re-entries.

Rental Services
Ancillary equipment such as generators, drill collars as well as proprietary tools such as the Hydra-Walk^{r} automated pipe handling system.

Coiled Tubing Services (CTS)
Provides fracing aka Hydraulic fracturing, acidizing and cementing services.

== History and notable acquisitions ==
While Key Energy traces its roots to New Hope, Pennsylvania, operating under the name The Yankee Companies, the company's current name is a legacy of Yale E. Key, a West Texas oilman from Midland, Texas, who started his oilwell service business in the 1940s. After his death in the 1980s, his company, Yale E. Key, Inc., was sold to the Yankee Companies. As a result of the continued acquisition of oilwell service companies, the Yankee Companies changed its name to Key Energy in the 1990s. Key Energy has grown through over 100^{2} acquisitions. In 2016, the company filed for Chapter 11 bankruptcy protection. Key Energy Services, Inc. became a non-public (private) company on December 14, 2020 (Form 15, U.S. Securities and Exchange Commission).

Notable historical acquisitions of Key Energy Services, Inc. are listed below.

Year	Company	Location
1993	Odessa Exploration	Texas
1994	Oilwell fishing tools	TX
1995	Clint Hurt and Associates	Texas
1996	WellTech	OK, MI, PA, WV and CA
	Woodward Oil Service	Oklahoma
	Brownlee Well Service/Integrity Fishing & Rental Tools	TX
	Energy Air Drilling Services	TX
	Hitwell Surveys	MI and WV
	Brooks Well Servicing	TX
	B&L Hotshot	MI
1997	Talon Trucking	OK
	Cobra Industries	NM
	Tri-State Wellhead & Valve	TX
	Kalkaska Construction/Elder Well Service	MI
	T.S.T. Parafin Service	TX
	Diamond Well Service	OK
	Drillers	Argentina
	Shreve Well Service	WV
	GSI Trucking & Kahlden Trucking	various
	Jeter Service	TX
1998	Dawson Production Services	Texas
1999	Six minor companies, adding 93 rigs to inventory	various
2001	Three minor acquisitions, adding 34 rigs to inventory	various
2002	Q Services	TX, LA, OK, NM and Gulf of Mexico
2003	Lea Fishing Tools (oilfield services)	NM
2004	Fleet Cementers	CA & TX
2007	Moncla Companies	LA, MS & TX
	Advanced Measurements Incorporated (AMI)	Canada
	Kings Oil Tools	CA
2008	Hydra-Walk, Inc.	OK
	Leader Energy (US operations)	MI, ND, WV

== See also ==
- List of oilfield service companies
