= Fairfield Geotechnologies =

- Company type: Privately held company
- Industry: Oilfield services
- Founded: 1976; 50 years ago
- Headquarters: Houston, Texas; United States
- Key people: Joe Dryer, CEO; Joseph Dryer, President; Jose Xavier, CFO
- Parent: Fairfield-Maxwell Ltd. (Sugahara family)
- Website: fairfieldgeo.com

Fairfield Geotechnologies is a seismic service company focusing on data licensing and data processing as well as imaging, data analytics and data interpretation. It is headquartered in Houston, Texas.

== History ==
The company was founded in 1976 and immediately began its first 2D transition zone program in Louisiana.

In 1989, it introduced its first, non-exclusive 3D survey.

In April 2005, the company acquired RFTrax.

In 2011, the company sold $30 million of seismic exploration equipment to Apache Corporation.

In April 2018, the company acquired Geokinetics’ U.S. multiclient data library.

In December 2018, the company sold its seismic technologies business and a U.K. subsidiary to Norway’s Magseis ASA for $233 million.

== See also ==
- List of oilfield service companies
