= Canary, LLC =

US-based oilfield services company

- Type: Privately held company
- Industry: Petroleum industry
- Predecessor: Frontier Energy Group, LLC
- Founded: 2009; 17 years ago
- Founders: Lynn Blevins and Jim Chappell
- Headquarters: Denver, CO, United States
- Area served: United States
- Key people: Dan K. Eberhart (CEO)
- Products: Wellheads, frac tree rental, wellhead components
- Services: Oilfield services
- Revenue: US$ 100 million (2014)
- Number of employees: Approximately 300
- Website: canaryusa.com

Canary is an American oilfield services company with headquarters in Denver, Colorado. In 2013, the company became the sixth largest wellhead company in the United States when Frontier Energy Group, LLC acquired Canary Wellhead Equipment Inc.

== History ==
Canary, LLC changed its name from Frontier Energy Group, LLC in January 2013. The rebranding occurred when Denver, Colorado-based Frontier Energy acquired Oklahoma City-based Canary Wellhead Equipment Inc. Canary Wellhead was founded in 1984 by Lynn Blevins and Jim Chappell, who both joined Canary, LLC as vice presidents.

The company was formed in 2009 when CEO Dan K. Eberhart purchased Frontier Energy Group, LLC after quitting a job at a Houston-based oilfield services company. Over the next three years, Eberhart acquired additional oilfield service companies, spending about $100 million before acquiring Canary Wellhead Equipment in 2013. These acquisitions were Kodiak Testing Company in 2009; Cable Inc., Western Wellhead Grand Junction, and Hanson Hot Oil in 2010; Luft Machine and Supply Co. in 2011; and Spicer Wireline Inc. in 2012.

When the company acquired Hanson Hot Oil in 2010, it became the largest hot oil company in the Williston Basin of North Dakota. The two companies operated as Frontier Hot Oil out of Watford City, North Dakota.

In 2014, the company acquired American Wellhead, which operates in the Permian Basin.

As Canary, LLC, the company has 26 locations in the United States and operates in the Bakken and Utica Shale plays and Mississippi Lime Field. It has over $100 million in revenue and is the 6th largest wellhead company in the United States.

In 2014, Canary was listed as number 1503 on the Inc. 5000 and was the tenth fastest growing private company in Denver.

In May 2025, Canary was "temporarily unable" to pay some employees in North Dakota due to financial challenges.
