= Cyntech =

Canadian industrial products company

Cyntech Group
- Industry: Helical Pile Manufacturing
- Founded: 1981; 45 years ago
- Headquarters: Calgary, Alberta, Canada
- Website: www.cyntechgroup.com

Cyntech Group is a company founded in 1981 which provides helical pile, helical rigid inclusion, and pipeline anchor engineering and manufacturing services for industrial markets.

== Milestones ==
In 2010, Cyntech was included in Alberta Venture Magazine as one of Alberta's top 25 fastest-growing companies with over $20 million in revenue. The company was then soon acquired by the North American Construction Group.

In July 2013, Keller Group plc acquired Cyntech Corporation as part of the acquisition of North American Caisson Ltd. (a division of North American Construction Group – NACG). In 2021, Cyntech's helical pile and pipeline anchoring division completed Management Buyout from Keller and became Cyntech Group.

== See also ==
- List of oilfield service companies
