= Nishiyodogawa-ku =

Ward of Osaka, Japan

Coordinates: 34°43′1″N 135°27′23″E

Location of Nishiyodogawa-ku in Osaka City

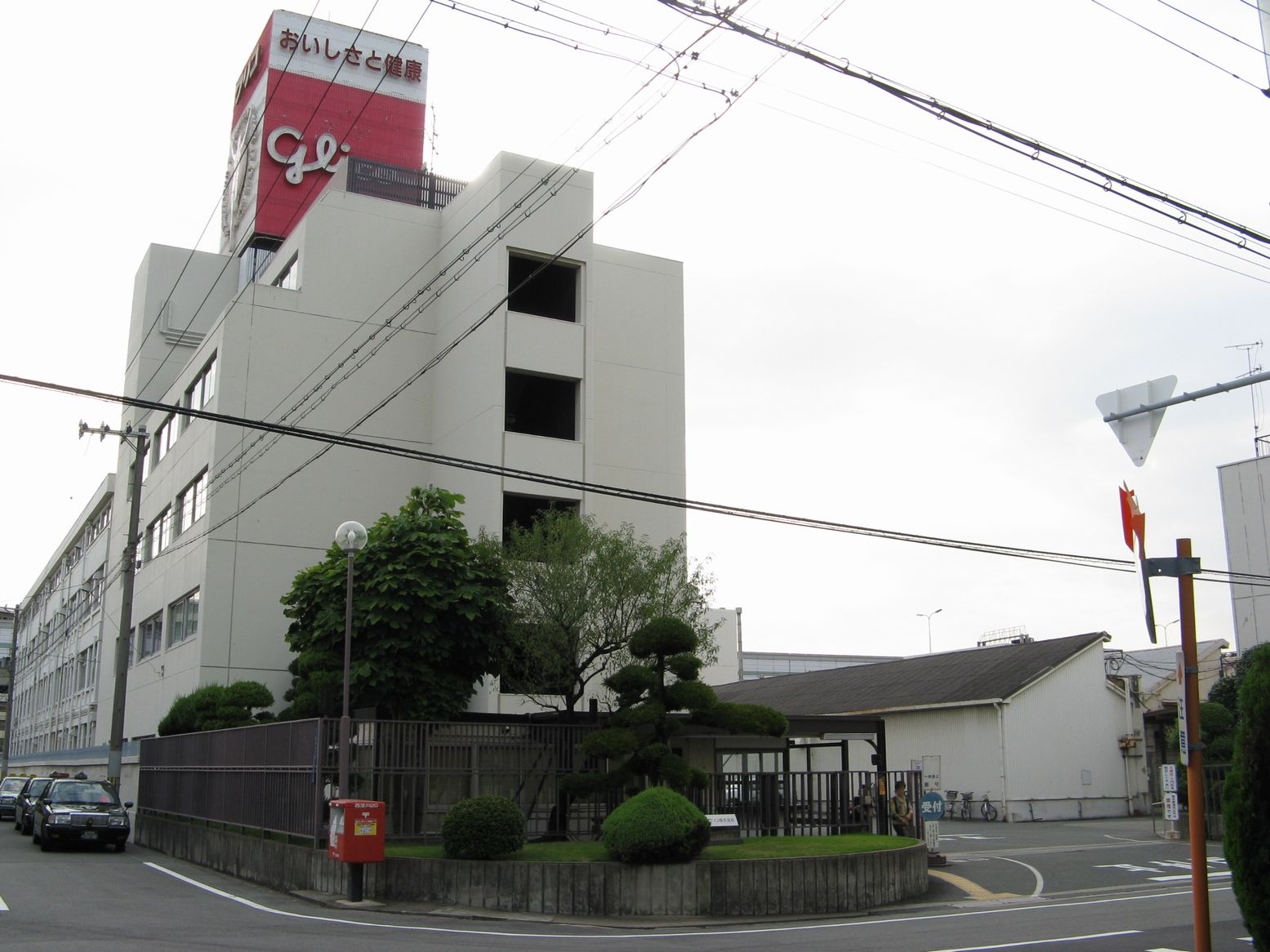
Ezaki Glico headquarters

Nishiyodogawa (西淀川区, Nishiyodogawa-ku) is one of 24 wards of Osaka, Japan.

== Education ==
It has a North Korean school, Osaka Fukushima Korean Elementary School (大阪福島朝鮮初級学校).

== Economy ==
Nishoyodogawa has the headquarters of Ezaki Glico and Daifuku.

== Notable people ==
- Hiroyuki Miyasako - comedian and voice actor
