= Calfrac Well Services =

Oilfield services company

Calfrac Well Services Ltd.
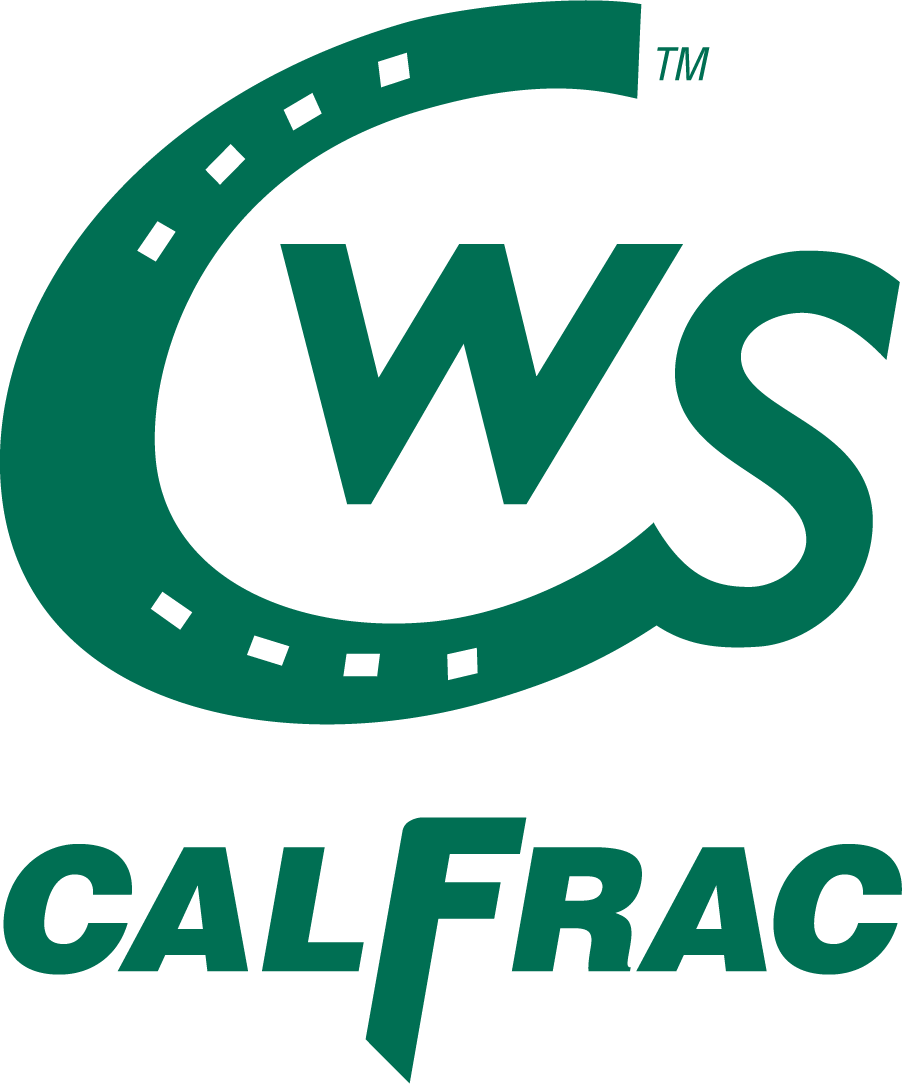
- Type: Public
- Traded as: TSX: CFW
- Industry: Oilfield Services
- Founded: 1999
- Headquarters: Calgary, Alberta. Denver, Colorado.
- Key people: Chief Executive Officer: Pat Powell (From June 3, 2022); Chief Financial Officer: Mike Olinek; Chairman: Ronald P. Mathison; Vice Chairman: Douglas Ramsay; Board of Directors: George Armoyan, Anuroop Duggal, Chetan Mehta, Charles Pellerin, Pat Powell; Divisions: Marco A. Aranguren (Director General, Latin American Operating Division), Gordon Milgate (President, Canadian Operating Division), Mark D. Rosen (President, U.S. Operating Division)
- Products: Oilfield services
- Website: www.calfrac.com

Calfrac Well Services Ltd. is an oilfield services company operating in Canada, the United States, and Argentina. Services include hydraulic fracturing, coiled tubing, cementing and other well stimulation techniques designed to help increase the production of oil and natural gas.

== History ==
Calfrac Well Services Ltd. (CWS) was founded on June 28, 1999 as a private corporation by Ronald P. Mathison, Douglas Ramsay, Gordon Dibb, and Robert (Robbie) Roberts. At that time, Calfrac had a single coiled tubing unit and was based in Medicine Hat, Alberta. In December 2000, Calfrac acquired Dynafrac Well Services Ltd. and with it a two-pumper fracturing spread, a shallow coiled tubing unit, a high rate nitrogen pumper and four acid pumpers. By the spring of 2001, Calfrac had acquired and constructed seven fracturing spreads plus other well stimulation equipment.

Early in 2002, CWS expanded to the U.S. Rocky Mountain region and started offering fracturing services through a field office in Platteville, Colorado. Calfrac continued to construct more fracturing spreads in 2002 and 2003, and had nine complete spreads by the start of 2004, where it became a publicly traded company on the Toronto Stock Exchange (TSX). In addition to building fracturing spreads in 2003, CWS also purchased four shallow coiled tubing units from private companies to increase its fleet of coiled tubing units to eight.

In 2007, Calfrac entered the Latin American market. Between 2007 and 2013, the company continued to expand through organic growth and strategic acquisitions with 1 million horsepower.

In 2015, Calfrac became the first pressure pumping company to receive the American Petroleum Institute's (API) Specification Q2. Between 2015 and 2016, seven North American locations become certified under API Q2.

By 2018, Calfrac had pumped 3.9 million tons of proppant with 1.2 million horsepower across North American fracturing fleets. In 2017, Calfrac commenced operations in the Permian Basin with a base in Artesia, NM. In 2018, Calfrac opened a full service technology center in Houston, TX, the Grande Prairie, Alberta location became certified under API Q2.

Between 2019 and 2021, Calfrac was awarded Top Vendor of the Year by a leading independent natural gas and NGL producer for the second consecutive year (2019), along with a consolidated U.S. operating presence into Rockies and Marcellus. In July 2020, Calfrac filed for Chapter 15 bankruptcy in the United States following a steep crude price decline following the COVID-19 pandemic. The company had reportedly been firing workers and trimming North American operations in an effort to cut costs. In 2021, Calfrac ended the year with Total Recordable Incident Frequency (TRIF) at 1.10 and the United States Division ends the year with TRIF at 0.62.

In June 2022, Pat Powell becomes Calfrac Well Services Chief Executive Officer (CEO) and updates brand promise to, "Do it Safely, Do it Right, Do it Profitably". Additionally, Calfrac grew active large fracturing fleet count from 13 to 15, with 6 coiled tubing units.

Into 2023, Calfrac continues to grow and excel in the oilfield services industry with fleet modernization program, deploying Tier IV DGB fracturing pumps into North America, with more coming in 2024. Additional new technology investments and asset enhancement commencing in 2023 and into 2024.

== See also ==
- List of oilfield service companies
- http://www.calfrac.com/
- Calfrac Instagram: https://www.instagram.com/calfracwellservices/
- Calfrac LinkedIn: https://www.linkedin.com/company/calfrac-well-services/
- Calfrac Twitter: https://twitter.com/CalfracWS
