= PJP4 =

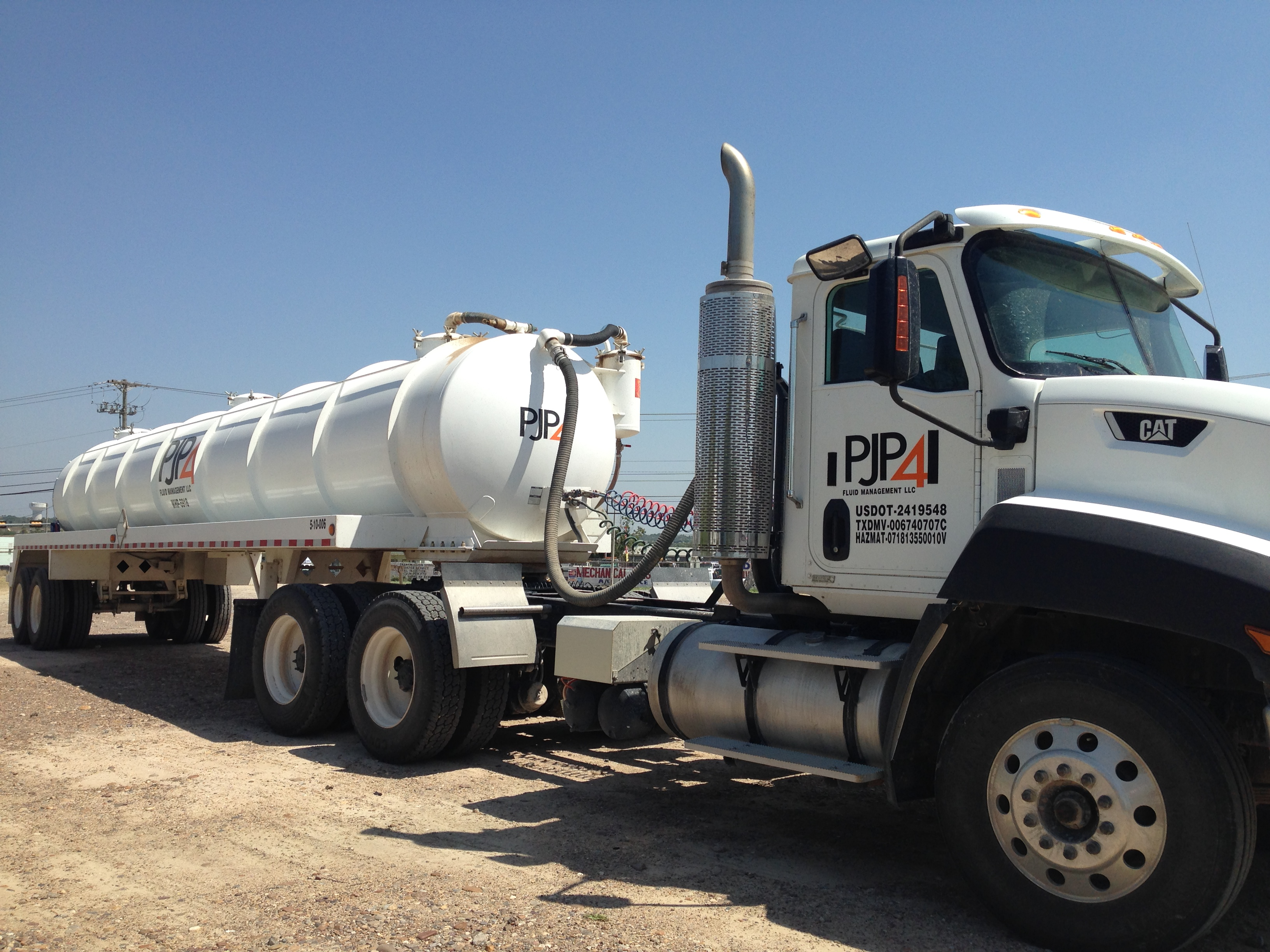
- PJP4 fluid transport truck in 2014
- Company type: Private
- Industry: Oilfield services & equipment
- Founded: 1998; 28 years ago
- Headquarters: Reynosa, Tamaulipas, Mexico
- Area served: Mexico and 7 other countries
- Key people: Francisco Layrisse (founder and CEO)
- Products: Products and services to the energy industry
- Number of employees: 1,000 (2014)
- Website: www.pjp4.com

PJP4 is a Mexican oilfield services company headquartered in Reynosa, Mexico. The company has operations in more than eight countries in the Americas, and employs more than 1,000 people across its operations, from the United States through to Venezuela.

As of 2014, PJP4 claims to have a daily production of over 250,000 barrels of petroleum and 350 million normal cubic feet of natural gas. The company is certified ISO 9001:2008, OHSAS 18001 and ISO 14001.

== History ==
The company was founded in 1998 in Mexico.

By 2014, the company was located along the coast of the Gulf of Mexico with offices in Poza Rica, Veracruz; Villahermosa, Tabasco and the headquarters in Reynosa, Mexico. Outside of Mexico, the company has offices in Caracas, Venezuela; Bogota, Colombia; Mission, Texas and Laredo, Texas.

== Services ==
The company provides the following oil field services:

- Operations and Maintenance
  - Management of mechanical and artificial systems
  - Control and monitoring systems
  - Testing of electrical systems
- Inspection and Evaluation
  - Cathodic inspection
  - Mechanical integrity
- Assessment of Conformity and Audit of Operational Control
- Personal Training and Certification
- General Engineering
- Construction
- Process Engineering and Product Optimization

== See also ==
- List of oilfield service companies
