= Gyrodata =

Gyrodata Incorporated
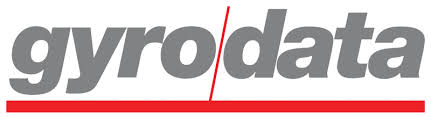
- Type: Private
- Industry: Oilfield Services
- Founded: 1980; 46 years ago
- Headquarters: Houston, TX,
- Services: Precision Wellbore Placement
- Number of employees: 500+
- Parent: SLB (2023-present)
- Website: www.gyrodata.com

Gyrodata, Incorporated is a privately owned company headquartered in Houston, Texas.

It provides gyroscopic surveying and wellbore logging, to the upstream oil and gas industry. The company’s surveying, wireline, and support services help customers place wells more precisely and accurately, improve hydrocarbon recovery factors, and reduce project lifecycle costs.

Gyrodata operates in more than 50 countries across multiple energy markets and employs approximately 600 people. The company has principal offices in Aberdeen, Scotland and Kuala Lumpur, Malaysia.

On February 3, 2023, the company was acquired by SLB.

== Services ==
The company operates across four major service areas: Drilling, Surveying, Wireline, and Support.

Drilling Services encompasses a wide range of technologies designed for directional drilling applications, including performance motors, measurement-while-drilling (MWD) tools, rotary steerable systems (RSS), and gyro-while-drilling (GWD) tools, the latter of which was invented by Gyrodata in 2002 to use real-time gyro steering and surveying data while drilling. Surveying Services provides gyroscopic surveys designed to improve wellbore placement using both spinning-mass and solid-state technology, depending on the application. Wireline Services covers not only traditional wireline and cased-hole logging solutions but unique offerings in high-density wellbore tortuosity logging and cement bond logging. Support Services covers drilling optimization and real-time monitoring provided by a remote operations center, with experts on-hand 24/7 to help improve performance and drilling challenges.

== History ==
Gyrodata was founded in Houston, Texas by Robert S McMahan, Steve Klopp, Gary Uttecht and a team of industry veterans who recognized a gap in the market for surveying technologies. Several large, multinational oil and gas companies supported Gyrodata during its formation in an effort to bring new surveying technologies to market. After several years of technology development and numerous field trials with leading oil and gas operators, Gyrodata ran the first commercial gyroscopic survey in 1983. Several months later, Gyrodata opened its office in Aberdeen, Scotland to provide services for the North Sea. In 1987, Gyrodata opened its first office in Malaysia, and began working across the Asia Pacific region. A year later, the company opened its first offices in the Middle East. That same year, Gyrodata introduced the Gyrodata Electronic Magnetic Surveyor (GEMS) steering tool, which provided drilling guidance in directional drilling applications and logging.

In the early 1990s, Gyrodata built its Eastern Hemisphere headquarters in Aberdeen, Scotland while opening new regional offices in Argentina and Venezuela, which represented its first entry into Latin America. Following this, the company introduced the gyroscopic steering tool in 1992, which allowed for real-time gyro toolface on wireline while drilling and sliding. The slimhole gyro system was also introduced the same year. Gyrodata commercialized the industry’s first drop gyroscopic surveying system in the mid-1990s, which used a battery-powered system. The drop tool eliminated the requirement for wireline and nonmagnetic collars, and the foundation of this technology remains a part of Gyrodata’s service offering today. In 1997, Gyrodata introduced its line of Advanced Logging Combination (ALC) tools, which enabled simultaneous collection of a gyro survey along with a variety of wireline logs provided by third-party wireline companies.

Fast-forward a few years to the start of the new millennium, and Gyrodata acquired Cambridge Drilling Automation to expand its technology and service offerings. Cambridge was an industry pioneer and leader in the development of RSS. This acquisition led to Gyrodata launching its own RSS—a closed-loop system with point-the-bit technology. The company launched its first GWD tool in 2002, providing drillers with the ability to use real-time gyro steering and surveying data while drilling. Simultaneously, Gyrodata introduced a survey-while-drilling technology in North America that would become the foundation of its future MWD technologies. In 2008, engineers at the company achieved compatibility with third-party electromagnetic telemetry to transmit GWD in real time with a broader range of host MWD tools and also performed the first successful run with a high-speed drop gyro system. The following year, the Continuous All-Attitude Tool (CAAT) was introduced, which provided continuous surveying from vertical to horizontal while moving in or out of the well.

In 2010, the company introduced several new technologies, including a new, in-house-developed gyroscope—which is the primary sensor used across a range of Gyrodata technologies and services—a new mud motor, and a new GWD system designed to provide surveys at up to 40° of inclination. GWD systems for wells with up to 70° of inclination shortly followed, establishing Gyrodata as the only provider of gyroscopic surveys above 40°. Construction began on the company’s new headquarters in Houston, Texas in 2010, and in early 2011, Gyrodata began operating from the new offices. The next several years saw a substantial amount of technology innovation, including a GWD system for wells up to 90°, a high-density tortuosity logging software to improve casing running and placement of artificial lift equipment, and two next-generation MWD systems: one that provided inclination and azimuth while drilling via mud-pulse telemetry, the other that used electromagnetic telemetry to enable compatibility with RSS and GWD tools.

The commercial release of solid-state gyroscopic technology in 2018 represented a step-change in the way the industry approached surveying. Following this, Gyrodata released two new products—one a drop gyro surveying system and one a GWD system—in 2019. Both were powered by solid-state gyros.
