= GlobaLogix =

Oilfield technology company in Texas, US

- Industry: Oil & Gas Technology
- Founded: 2004
- Headquarters: Houston, Texas, U.S.
- Services: Remote oilfield monitoring, Oil & Gas consultation
- Number of employees: ~200
- Website: https://globlx.com

GlobaLogix is an oilfield engineering and technology company, operating in Houston, Texas. It offers several services related to the industry, from remote data management and collection to automation consultation.

== History ==
Incorporated in 2004, GlobaLogix was created as a business offering a service that allows for the remote observation, and data collection of oilfields.

In 2007, the Houston Business Journal named GlobaLogix the fastest growing company in Houston. Sales from 2006 rose $347,000 to $5,017,000 in 2007. Headcount of the staff passed the 100 mark in 2009.

In 2010 GlobaLogix's vice president, Jim Ferrero, announced that GlobaLogix would also offer consultation to companies considering transitioning to more carbon-neutral operations. These consultations would provide evaluations and suggestions for more efficient automation of the industry, as well as a movement towards more digital management.

== Services ==
GlobaLogix offers multiple services to clients, including Wireless, satellite, radio, Wi-Fi, supervisory control and data acquisition or SCADA, human-machine interface, and programmable logic controllers. The company also provide consulting services, which include evaluating current oilfield operations and assisting clients in implementing automated systems that incorporate existing equipment.

GlobaLogix's stated business purpose is to help companies achieve greener operations in their oil and natural gas fields by using predictive maintenance to address field problems, avoid shutdowns, and reduce the number of miles driven each day by field personnel.
