= Robbins & Myers =

Robbins & Myers, Inc.
- Company type: subsidiary
- Industry: Industrial Value Manufacturing
- Headquarters: United States
- Products: Oilfield equipment
- Parent: NOV Inc.
- Website: robn.com

Robbins & Myers, Inc. is a manufacturer of engineered equipment and systems in global energy and industrial markets. There are basically two segments operating in the company, namely Energy Services and Process and Flow Control. In February 2013, National Oilwell Varco, Inc. acquired Robbins & Myers Inc.

== Products ==
There are two segments in Robbins & Myers. The company's Energy Services division provides T-3, critical well drilling equipment parts for drilling operations (such as production, pipeline transmission ) of oil and gas.
The company's Process and Flow Control division provides glass-lined reactors and storage vessels, industrial progressing cavity pumps, valve controls and grinders, fluid-agitation equipment. Robbins & Myers also used to own Hunter Fan Company, a ceiling fan company based in Memphis, Tennessee until 1986, when the fan company was spun off into its own entity.

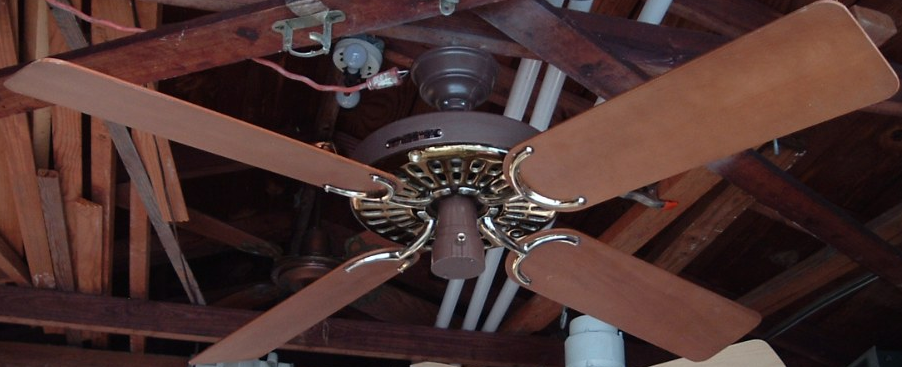
Hunter Original Manufactured by Robbins & Myers in 1980

== Operations ==
In August 2012, Robbins & Myers, Inc. and National Oilwell Varco, Inc. agreed that National Oilwell Varco would acquire Robbins & Myers with about $2.5 billion in cash. In February 2013, the acquisition was completed after antitrust clearance.

In 2001, the company purchased Romaco N. V. from Brian Fenwick-Smith, the company's founder.

In 2011, the Company sold Romaco Businesses to a group of funds led by Deutsche Beteiligungs AG.
