= Abbot Group =

Oil and gas services company based in Aberdeen, Scotland

Abbot Group Limited
- Company type: Private
- Industry: Oil and gas services
- Headquarters: Aberdeen, Scotland
- Owner: First Reserve Corporation

Abbot Group Limited is an oil and gas services company based in Aberdeen, Scotland. The Group employs more than 8,000 people in over 20 countries around the world.

The group has two operating divisions, KCA DEUTAG and Bentec. DEUTAG was acquired in 2001 and was merged with KCA Drilling. They constituted the division that provide offshore and onshore drilling services. Bentec, on the other hand, provides related well and facilities engineering services to the energy industry. The company operates in the North Sea and in locations such as Russia, the Middle East, Caspian Region, North and West Africa, and Asia.

In 2007, Alasdair Locke was the executive chairman of Abbot Group. He had founded the company. Also in 2007, Abbot Group was the largest oil-rig contractor to companies operating in the North Sea. Its markets included the North Sea, Caspian Sea, Russia, North Africa, and the Middle East.

On 7 March 2008, Abbot Group was acquired by US private equity firm First Reserve Corporation.

In 2012, Abbot was involved in a bribery settlement with the British government, paying £5.6m as penalty for bribes made to win a contract. The penalty, which was cited as civil recovery, was announced on November 23, 2012. The amount was equivalent to "advantage received by the company" from the contract it won by bribing Scottish officials. The series of payments was entered into by one of its overseas subsidiaries.

== See also ==
- List of oilfield service companies
