= Polarcus =

Geophysical research company

Polarcus Limited
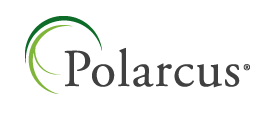
- Company type: Public limited company
- Traded as: OSE: PLCS (formerly)
- Industry: Oceanographic Research
- Founded: 2008
- Defunct: 2021
- Headquarters: Dubai, UAE
- Area served: Global
- Key people: Mike Mannering (Chairman), Duncan Eley (CEO), Hans-Peter Burlid (CFO)
- Products: Geophysical services
- Number of employees: 500 people (during its operation)
- Website: www.polarcus.com

Polarcus Limited was a geophysical research company operating a fleet of modern DP2 seismic research vessels worldwide.

== Background ==
The company described itself as having a strong environmental focus that aims to decrease emissions to both sea and air. Polarcus vessels were the first fleet in the world to receive the DNV accredited Triple E rating for high energy efficiency and environmental performance ratings.

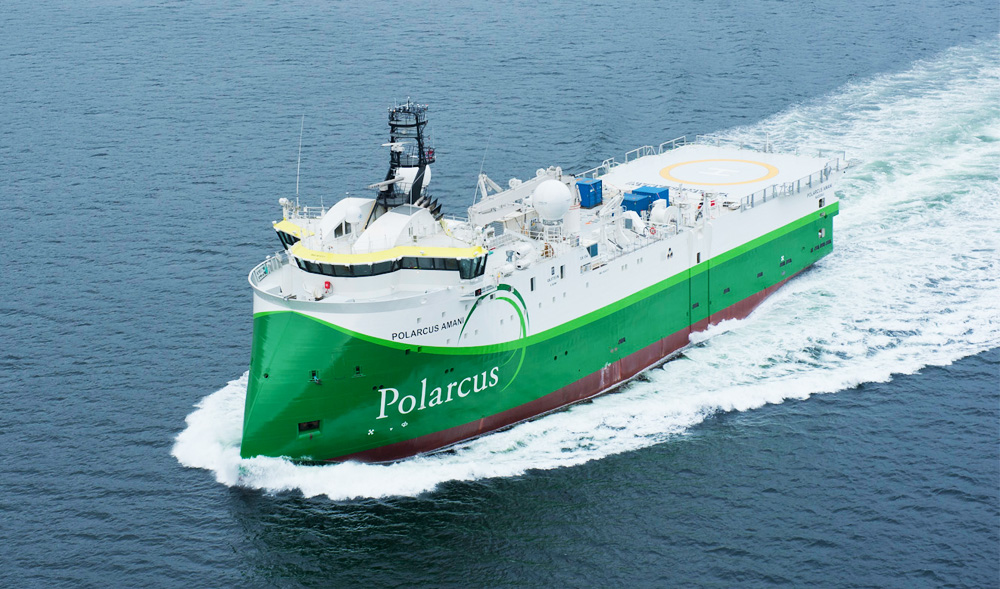
Polarcus Amani Seismic research Vessel

Founded in 2008 in Dubai, UAE, Polarcus completed projects across the globe from Greenland to Sakhalin, Russia. After defaulting on debts, lenders took control of the company in January 2021. Shearwater GeoServices bought six seismic acquisition vessels for $127.5 million and streamers and related seismic equipment formerly owned by Polarcus for $50 million.

== See also ==
- List of oilfield service companies

== Shares ==
Polarcus listed its shares on the Oslo Stock Exchange OTC list in 2008, and in 2009 began trading on the Oslo Stock Exchange OSE list, under the ticker PLCS. The company was delisted in 2021.
