= Grant Prideco =

Oilfield services and equipment provider

Grant Prideco, Inc.
- Formerly: Grant Corporations (1975–1986); Grant TFW (1986–1995)
- Type: Subsidiary
- Traded as: NYSE: GRP (2000–2008)
- Industry: Oilfield services and equipment
- Predecessor: Grant Supply Company
- Founded: 1975; 51 years ago in Houston
- Founder: Charles Grant
- Headquarters: Houston, Texas, United States
- Parent: EVI (1990–1998); Weatherford (1998–2000); NOV Inc. (from 2008)
- Subsidiaries: ReedHycalog (from 2003); IntelliServ (from 2005)
- Website: grantprideco.com

Grant Prideco, Inc. is a supplier of drill pipe and drill stem accessories headquartered in Houston, Texas. Since 2008, it has been a subsidiary of energy services company NOV Inc. Grant Prideco was included on the Fortune magazine top 1000 largest corporations for several years in the mid-2000s and through the 1990s and early 2000s was the world's largest oilfield drill pipe supplier.

== History ==
=== Background and early history ===
The earliest indirect predecessor to Grant Prideco was the Grant Supply Company, founded in 1960 by engineer Charles Grant in Tulsa, Oklahoma. Grant Supply was a distributor of pipe, valves, fittings, and other equipment to oil production companies. Grant then founded the Grant Oil Tubular Corporation in Houston in 1970 and a Canadian subsidiary, Grant Corporations Ltd., in 1971. In 1975, the company founded the direct predecessor to Grant Prideco, Grant Corporations, in Houston as a holding company for Grant Supply, Grant Oil Tubular, and the Canadian Grant Corporations.

The holding company then founded Tubular Finishing Works Inc. (TFW), a finishing and processing plant for pipe and tube products, in Navasota, Texas in 1978. During this period, Grant Supply continued its expansion and by the mid-1980s had six sales offices and was contributing 60% of Grant Corporations revenue. However, Grant Supply overextended itself through expansion and filed for Chapter 11 bankruptcy in 1986. After the subsidiary's shutdown, Grant Corporation changed its name to Grant TFW.

=== EVI subsidiary ===
In the late 1980s, EVI Inc. (formerly Energy Ventures Inc.) started acquiring a stake in Grant. It bought 32% of the company in 1987 which it increased to a controlling interest of 67% in 1988. EVI then shifted Grant's operations from distribution to manufacturing focused on drill pipe and premium tubulars. In 1990, EVI acquired the remainder of the company making it a wholly owned subsidiary.

Under EVI, Grant grew substantially through a number of acquisitions. These included the assets of Hughes Tool Company's Houston-based Hughes Tool Joints division in 1990 making Grant one of the world's largest manufacturers of drill strings. Around this time it also bought the drill pipe manufacturing operations of Reed Tool Co., also based in Houston. Grant's purchase of Atlas Bradford in 1992 expanded its tubular products offerings. It also opened several sales offices in Europe and Asia.

In 1995, the company's parent, EVI, acquired Houston-based Prideco Inc. from Christiana Companies and merged it with Grant TFW forming Grant Prideco. The combined company was the largest drill pipe manufacturer and supplier worldwide. EVI acquired Weatherford Enterra in 1998 and initially EVI took the name of its new acquisition but, later in the year, changed its name to Weatherford International.

=== Resumed independence ===
Grant Prideco went public in 2000 after being spun off by Weatherford. As an independent company, Grant Prideco continued its strategy of expansion through acquisition. In November 2002, it bought Casper, Wyoming-based Grey-Mak Pipe from Flint Energy Services and, in December, Houston-based drill bit manufacturer Reed-Hycalog from Schlumberger. At US$350 million, the Reed-Hycalog acquisition was the largest in Grant Prideco's history.

By 2004, Grant Prideco and its subsidiaries operated 22 manufacturing facilities across North America, Europe, and Asia. It shut down its Edmonton, Alberta drill pipe manufacturing unit in February 2004 laying off 113 workers at the facility, though it retained over 50 service and manufacturing employees and continued to manufacture specialized pipe and tubing in Edmonton. In June 2004, subsidiary ReedHycalog bought the synthetic diamond cutter manufacturing unit of Novatek Corp. for US$21 million and in August Grant Prideco acquired Houston-based drill bit producer Diamond Products International from NQL Drilling Tools for US$17 million.

In 2005, the company acquired IntelliServ, a drilling string system used to transmit data between measurement equipment located in the bottom hole assembly at the bottom of a drill string and surface operators. IntelliServ had been developed by Grant Prideco in cooperation with Novatek Engineering as part of a Department of Energy project in the early 2000s.

=== NOV subsidiary ===
Grant Prideco was acquired by Houston-based National Oilwell Varco, later renamed NOV Inc., in 2008. for US$7.37 billion. At the time, Grant Prideco operated 25 manufacturing sites worldwide and held 60% of the global drill pipe market.
