= Merrill A. Miller Jr. =

American business executive (born 1950)

- Born: July 4, 1950; Burlington, Iowa, U.S.
- Education: The United States Military Academy at West Point
- Occupations: Chairman, president, & CEO at National Oilwell Varco, Inc. (2001–2014)

Merrill A. “Pete” Miller Jr. (Pete Miller) is an American business executive recognized for his leadership roles in the oil and gas industry. He is best known for his tenure as chairman and chief executive officer of National Oilwell Varco, Inc. (NYSE:NOV), a global supplier of oilfield services, equipment, and components to the energy sector. In November 2013, Miller announced he would step down as chairman and CEO to become the executive chairman of the company’s spinoff distribution business, DNOW (NYSE:DNOW), formerly known as DistributionNOW and NOW Inc. Since May 2015 he is also chairman of the Swiss offshore drilling company Transocean.

== Early life and education ==
Miller was born on July 4, 1950, in Burlington, Iowa, and grew up with three sisters and a brother. He graduated from Burlington High School in 1968 before attending the United States Military Academy at West Point, earning a degree in applied science and engineering in 1972. He later obtained an MBA from Harvard Business School in 1980.

== Career ==
Miller began his career by serving in the United States Army for five years after graduating from West Point. He then entered the oilfield services industry, spending 15 years at Helmerich & Payne, where he rose to the role of vice president of U.S. operations.

In January 1995, Miller became the president of Anadarko Drilling Company, serving until February 1996. He then joined National Oilwell (later National Oilwell Varco, Inc.), where he held several leadership roles, including chief operating officer and president. In May 2001, he was appointed chief executive officer of NOV, a position he held until February 2014. Miller also served as chairman of the board from 2005 to 2014.

=== Retirement ===
In May 2014, after overseeing NOV’s spinoff of its distribution business, he became the executive chairman and chairman of the board of DistributionNOW (DNOW). He held these roles until his retirement on October 1, 2017. Miller’s leadership was recognized during a challenging period for the industry, and upon his retirement, J. Wayne Richards was appointed as the new chairman of the board. Miller’s contributions were acknowledged by the company’s leadership for his guidance during one of the most significant downturns in the oil and gas sector.

== Board memberships and affiliations ==
Miller has served on the board of several prominent organizations. He was the chairman of DNOW (formerly DistributionNOW) from 2014 until his retirement in 2017. Additionally, he is the current chairman of the board for Transocean, and he has served on the boards of Chesapeake Energy Corporation and the Offshore Energy Center. He has also been an advisory board member of Spindletop International and a member of the National Petroleum Council.

== Awards and recognition ==
In 2012, Miller was named CEO of the Year by Morningstar for his leadership at National Oilwell Varco.
