= NOV Inc. =

U.S. energy company

NOV

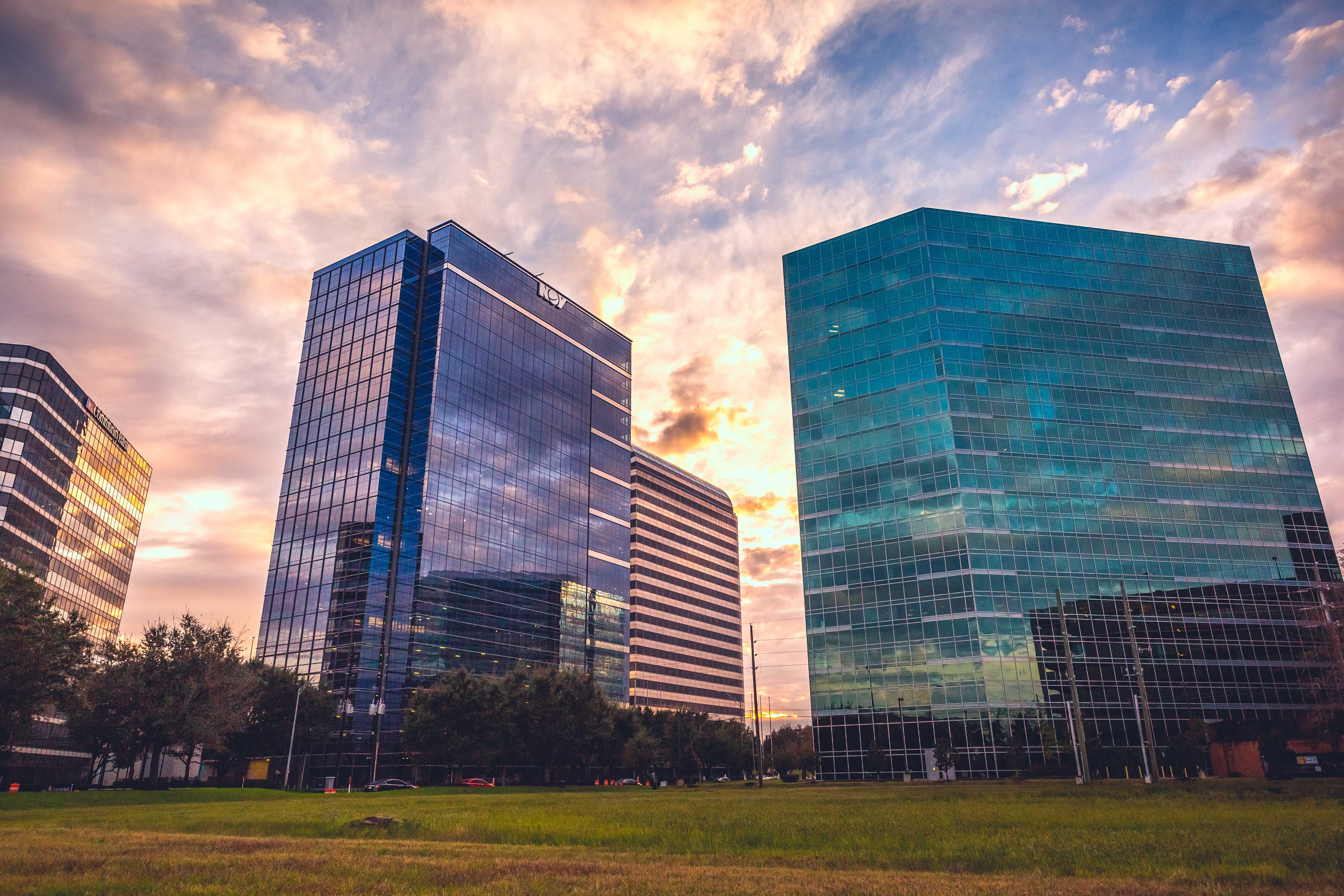
- NOV Tower in the Westchase district of Houston
- Formerly: National Oilwell Varco (2005–2021)
- Type: Public
- Traded as: NYSE: NOV; S&P 400 component
- Industry: Oilfield services and equipment
- Predecessors: National Oilwell; Varco
- Founded: 1862; 164 years ago
- Headquarters: Houston, Texas, United States
- Number of locations: 552 (2021)
- Area served: Worldwide
- Key people: Jose Bayardo (CEO)
- Revenue: ▲US$8.87 billion (2024)
- Operating income: ▲US$876 million (2024)
- Net income: ▼US$635 million (2024)
- Total assets: ▲US$11,360 million (2024)
- Total equity: ▲US$6,380 million (2024)
- Number of employees: 34,010 (2024)
- Divisions: Energy Equipment; Energy Products and Services
- Subsidiaries: Grant Prideco; IntelliServ; Robbins & Myers; Shaffer
- Website: nov.com
- Footnotes; Financial, employee, and location figures are for fiscal year 2021

NOV, formerly National Oilwell Varco, is an American multinational corporation based in Houston, Texas. It is a worldwide provider of equipment and components used in oil and gas drilling and production operations, oilfield services, and supply chain integration services to the upstream oil and gas industry. The company conducts operations in more than 500 locations across six continents, operating through two reporting segments: Energy Equipment and Energy Products and Services.

== History ==
=== Background ===
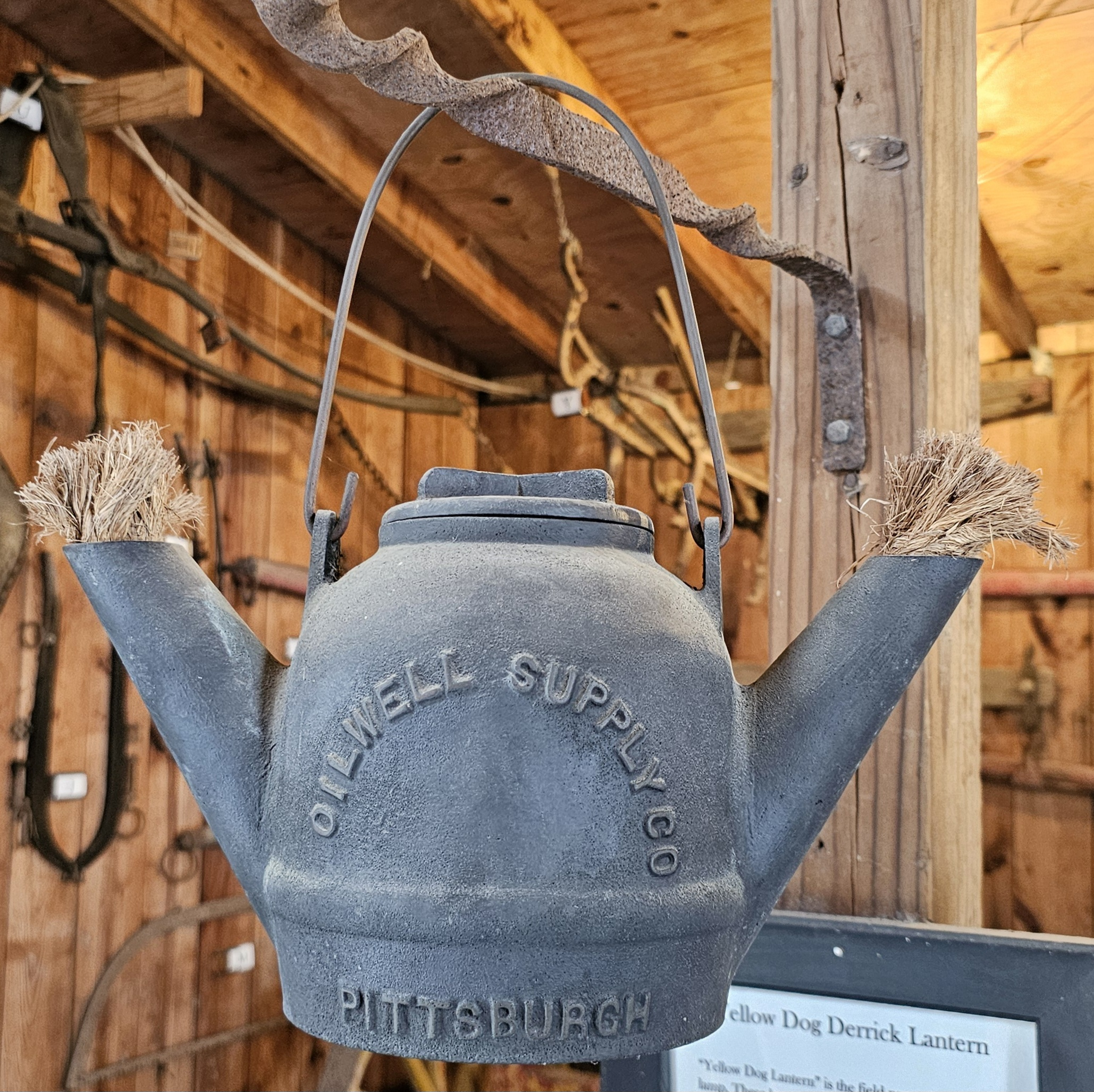
An Oilwell Supply lantern at the Spindletop-Gladys City Boomtown Museum

NOV's two main predecessors, Oilwell Supply and National Supply, were founded in 1862 and 1893, respectively. These two companies manufactured and distributed pumps and derricks. In 1930, United States Steel acquired Oilwell Supply. In 1958, Armco Steel merged with National Supply. In 1987, National Supply merged with USS Oilwell to become "National Oilwell".

Varco was founded as Abegg and Reinhold Company by Walter Abegg and Baldwin Reinhold in 1908. "VARCO" is an acronym for: Vuilleumiere, Abegg and Reinhold Company after Edgar Vuilleumiere became a partner in 1915, and Varco International in 1973. In 2000, National Oilwell merged with IRI International Corp. (founded as a merger of Ingersoll Rand Oilfield Products Co. and IDECO Inc. (International Derrick and Equipment Company)), founded and managed by Hushang Ansary, which manufactures and sells drilling rigs and specialty steel products.

In 2005, National Oilwell and Varco merged to become National Oilwell Varco.

=== Recent history ===
The company acquired major drill pipe and drill bit manufacturer Grant Prideco in 2008 for $7.37 billion. At the time, Grant Prideco held 60% of the global drill pipe market and operated 25 manufacturing sites worldwide. The acquisition included Grant Prideco's subsidiaries IntelliServ, a producer of drill pipe with built-in equipment to transmit data from a wellhead to surface operators, ReedHycalog, a drill bit producer, and XL Systems, a producer of oil and gas connectors. Grant Prideco, IntelliServ, and ReedHycalog became part of NOV's Wellbore Technologies reporting segment and XL Systems joined the Completion & Production Solutions segment.

In February 2012 NOV acquired Russian coring company Interval Ltd. and purchased Dutch oil rig design company GustoMSC in 2018. GustoMSC, originally the engineering office of Gusto Shipyard, became part of NOV's Rig Technologies segment. In late 2019, NOV bought Bellingham, Washington-based Ershigs, a fabricator of custom pipes and tanks.

National Oilwell Varco changed its name to NOV Inc. on January 1, 2021.

== Corporate affairs ==
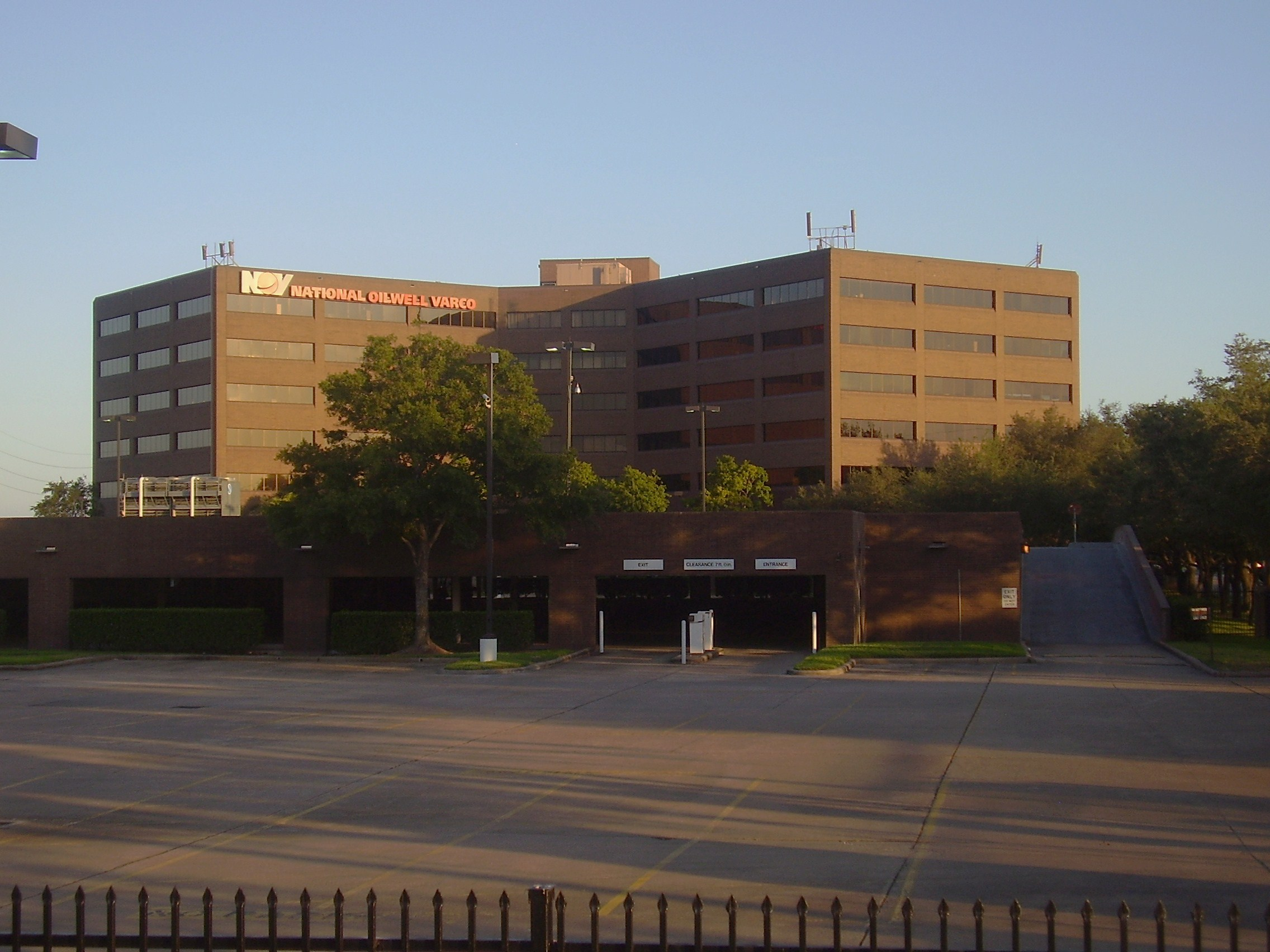
National Oilwell Varco headquarters in Greater Sharpstown, Houston

The company's headquarters are in Southwest Management District (formerly Greater Sharpstown), Houston. As of 2021, it employed over 27,000 people and operated over 550 facilities worldwide.

In 2014, Clay Williams took over as CEO of National Oilwell Varco, succeeding former CEO Pete Miller, who served as NOV's CEO for nearly 13 years. After overseeing NOV’s spinoff of its distribution business, Pete Miller became the Executive Chairman and Chairman of the Board of DNOW (NYSE:DNOW), formerly known as DistributionNOW and NOW Inc. He held these roles until his retirement on October 1, 2017

On January 1, 2026, Jose Bayardo, NOV’s former president and COO, succeeded Clay Williams and serves as Chairman, President and Chief Executive Officer.

== Divisions ==
=== Rig Technologies ===
Rig Technologies engineers and manufactures drilling rigs, drilling equipment packages, and related capital equipment (including top drives, iron roughnecks, drawworks, blowout preventers, mud pumps, risers, pipe handling, power and control systems) necessary to drill oil and gas wells, as well as marine construction equipment such as heavy-lift cranes, mooring machinery, jacking systems, pipelay and cablelay systems, and marine riser tensioners. In addition, the segment provides aftermarket equipment and services such as spare parts, repair, and equipment rentals as well as remote equipment monitoring, technical support, field service, and customer training.

=== Wellbore Technologies ===
Wellbore Technologies develops equipment, technologies, and services for oil and gas well operation. The segment provides drill bits, borehole enlargement services, and directional drilling tools; optimization/automation software and services; downhole tools for drilling and intervention; premium drill pipe and drill stem accessories; solids control and waste management equipment and services; drilling and completion fluids; data acquisition and analytics technologies; managed-pressure-drilling systems; coating and inspection services and RFID technology for drill pipe lifecycle management; and IntelliServ wired drill pipe.

=== Completion & Production Solutions ===
Completion & Production Solutions provides equipment and technologies for the well completion process and production phase of a well's lifecycle. The segment produces intervention and stimulation equipment for pressure pumping, coiled tubing, and wireline operations; composite piping systems, pressure vessels, and structures; integrated processing, production, and pumping equipment (including artificial lift) for upstream, midstream, and industrial operations; hydrate inhibition and gas processing technologies; subsea and floating production systems, including flexible pipe and subsea water injection technologies; integral and weld-on connectors for conductor strings, surface casing, and liners; and completion tools—including those involved in multistage hydraulic fracturing—liner hanger systems, and subsurface safety valves.

== Awards and accolades ==
In 2008, NOV was listed as one of the world's most admired companies by Forbes. It was also listed as one of the 100 fastest growing companies by Fortune in both 2008 and 2009 and one of America's top companies by Forbes in 2009.

== See also ==
- List of oilfield service companies
