= Frontier Energy Group =

Frontier Energy Group, LLC
- Company type: Privately held company
- Industry: Oilfield Services
- Predecessor: Frontier Wellhead & Supply Co.
- Founded: 1986; 40 years ago
- Defunct: January 15, 2013; 13 years ago
- Fate: Merged with Canary, LLC
- Successor: Canary, LLC
- Headquarters: Denver, Colorado, United States
- Area served: Western United States
- Key people: Dan Eberhart, CEO
- Divisions: Drilling Services; Production Services
- Website: canaryusa.com

Frontier Energy Group, LLC was an oil field well drilling & production service company based in Denver with offices in the various unconventional oil shale plays in the Western United States. The company provided in wellhead and slickline services with petroleum and natural gas companies.

In January 2013, it merged with Canary, LLC.

== History ==
The company traces its history back to 1986 with the opening of Frontier Wellhead & Supply in Watford City, North Dakota.

=== Major acquisitions ===
- Frontier Wellhead & Supply Co. (2008)
- Kodiak Stack Testing Company (2009)
- Cable, Incorporated (2010)
- Hanson Hot Oil (2010)
- Luft Machine & Supply Co. (2011)
- Spicer Wireline Inc. (2012)
- Canary Wellhead Equipment (2013) for "less than $100 million"
