= Weatherford International =

American energy company

Weatherford International plc
- Type: Public
- Traded as: Nasdaq: WFRD; S&P 400 component
- ISIN: IE00BLNN3691
- Industry: Oilfield services & equipment
- Founded: 1941; 85 years ago
- Founder: Jesse E. Hall Jr. (Weatherford Oil Tool Company); Jesse E. Hall Sr. (Weatherford Spring Company)
- Headquarters: Houston, Texas, U.S.
- Key people: Girish K. Saligram (CEO)
- Services: Diversified oilfield services
- Revenue: ▲US$5.51 billion (2024)
- Operating income: ▲US$938 million (2024)
- Net income: ▲US$506 million (2024)
- Total assets: ▲US$5.16 billion (2024)
- Total equity: ▲US$1.28 billion (2024)
- Number of employees: 19,000 (2024)
- Website: weatherford.com

Weatherford International plc is an American multinational oilfield service company, headquartered in the US and operating in 75 countries globally across the oil and natural gas producing regions. The company provides technical equipment and services used for drilling, evaluation, completion, production, and intervention on gas and oil wells.

== History ==
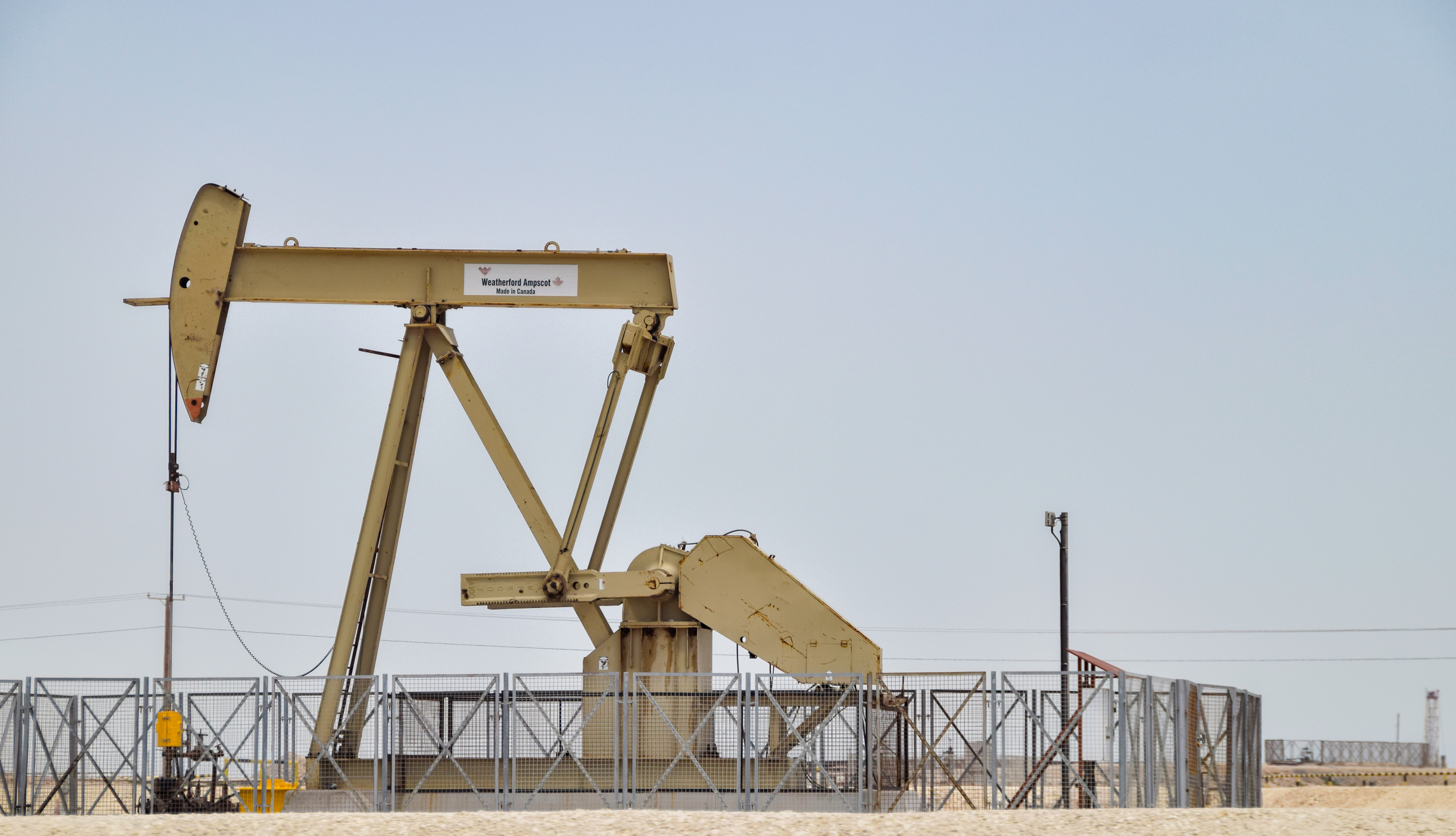
Weatherford International nodding donkey pump in Bahrain

Weatherford International was established in 1987. The company's roots date back to Weatherford, Texas, where Jesse E. Hall Sr., inventor of the spiral centralizer and casing scratcher used in oil-well cementing, began manufacturing around 1941 as a sole proprietorship under the trade name Weatherford Spring Company. In September 1948 Hall Sr. sold the business at book value to a corporation in which his son Jesse E. Hall Jr. held half the shares and his brothers George, John and Elmer Hall held the remainder (3, 1 and 1 of 10 shares); a new Texas corporation formed on December 15, 1948 took over the business, and Hall Sr. retained no ownership thereafter. That corporation, Weatherford Oil Tool Company, Inc., was founded in 1948 by Jesse E. Hall Jr., who served as its president until his retirement; his brothers George, John and Elmer Hall held minority interests.

Weatherford today consists of the consolidation of more than 300 acquisitions since its establishment. It was initially called Energy Ventures, then EVI (1990), and finally Weatherford International (1998). Energy Ventures (an E&P company that had been created in 1972) was publicly traded (OTC: ENGY) with a small market capitalization of about US$15 million. Bernard J. Duroc-Danner was hired and charged with the start-up of oilfield service and equipment operations.

Between 1999 and 2008, Weatherford experienced high growth and continued building its service business through acquisitions and organic growth. Part of the growth strategy was developing the company's asset base with a primary focus on mature fields, which was a significant departure from industry trends during that time. In 2001, the company separated the tubulars business from its core offerings, believing that the intense capital requirements would prevent investments in core growth areas such as formation evaluation, well construction, and production. Afterward, expansion continued through 2009, and Weatherford grew by over 20% per annum, generating close to $10 billion in revenues in 2008.

In 2008, the company announced that it was shifting its place of incorporation from Bermuda to Switzerland.

In April 2014, Weatherford announced that its board of directors approved relocating its legal domicile to Ireland from Switzerland. The company maintains its operational office in Houston, Texas.

In November 2016, Weatherford announced Krishna Shivram as Interim Chief Executive Officer and Robert Rayne as chairman of the board.

In March 2017, Weatherford appointed Mark A. McCollum as president, chief executive officer, and a member of the board of directors of Weatherford. The company also announced the appointment of Mr. William E. Macaulay as chairman of the board of directors.

The company filed for Chapter 11 bankruptcy in the Southern District of Texas in July 2019, along with two subsidiaries. The petitions listed assets of more than $1 billion. In December 2019, Weatherford announced that it completed its financial restructuring and emerged from Chapter 11 protection. The company emerged with a stronger financial foundation, having reduced approximately $6.2 billion of outstanding funded debt, secured $2.6 billion in exit financing facilities, a $195M letter of credit facility, and $900M of liquidity.

In June 2020, Weatherford announced several changes to its executive leadership team, including Mark A. McCollum and chief financial officer Christian Garcia's resignation. Weatherford appointed Karl Blanchard, vice president and chief financial officer, as interim chief executive officer. On June 12, 2020, the company's board of directors named Charles M. Sledge the chairman of the board.

The board of directors announced in September 2020 that it would appoint Girish K. Saligram as the company's president and chief executive officer. The appointment became effective on 12 October 2020. Girish K. Saligram was also appointed to the board of directors on 12 October 2020. Before joining Weatherford, Girish served Exterran Corporation as Chief Operating Officer, and had previously served as President, Global Services, after joining the company in 2016.

On June 1, 2021, Weatherford International plc (OTC Pink: WFTLF) announced that Nasdaq has approved its application for the relisting of Weatherford's ordinary shares on Nasdaq under the ticker symbol "WFRD", effective with the opening of trading on Wednesday, June 2, 2021.

== Controversies ==
=== Sanctions violations ===
==== Cuba ====
According to the United States, Weatherford and its subsidiary P.D. Drilling Holdings Inc. knowingly sold products that included US goods to Cuba, violating the Trading with the Enemy Act of 1917. Staff allegedly falsified documents stating that they had shipped goods to Barcelona, Venezuela, where they were later sent to Cuba.

==== Sudan ====
In July 2007, the company was featured in news media reports questioning operations of the company's foreign subsidiary, Weatherford Oil Tool Middle East, which had offices and equipment in the nation of Sudan. Since 1997, U.S. companies were forbidden by law to operate in Sudan, though foreign subsidiaries of U.S. companies could still legally operate in that country if there was no involvement by the U.S. parent or any other U.S. person. Nevertheless, in response to media and investor criticism, the company announced that it would divest itself of any foreign subsidiary operations in countries sanctioned by the United States. The next year, Weatherford withdrew from activities in Sudan and donated its in-country equipment as well as providing additional equipment, supplies, and funding to Thirst No More, a humanitarian organization operating in Sudan.

=== Paradise Papers ===
Precision Drilling de Venezuela and P.D. Drilling Holdings Inc., subsidiaries of Weatherford, were featured in the Paradise Papers leak featuring offshore firms located in Barbados.

== See also ==
- List of oilfield service companies
- Grant Prideco – Former Weatherford subsidiary (1990–2000)
