= Baggage handling system =

Type of conveyor system in airports

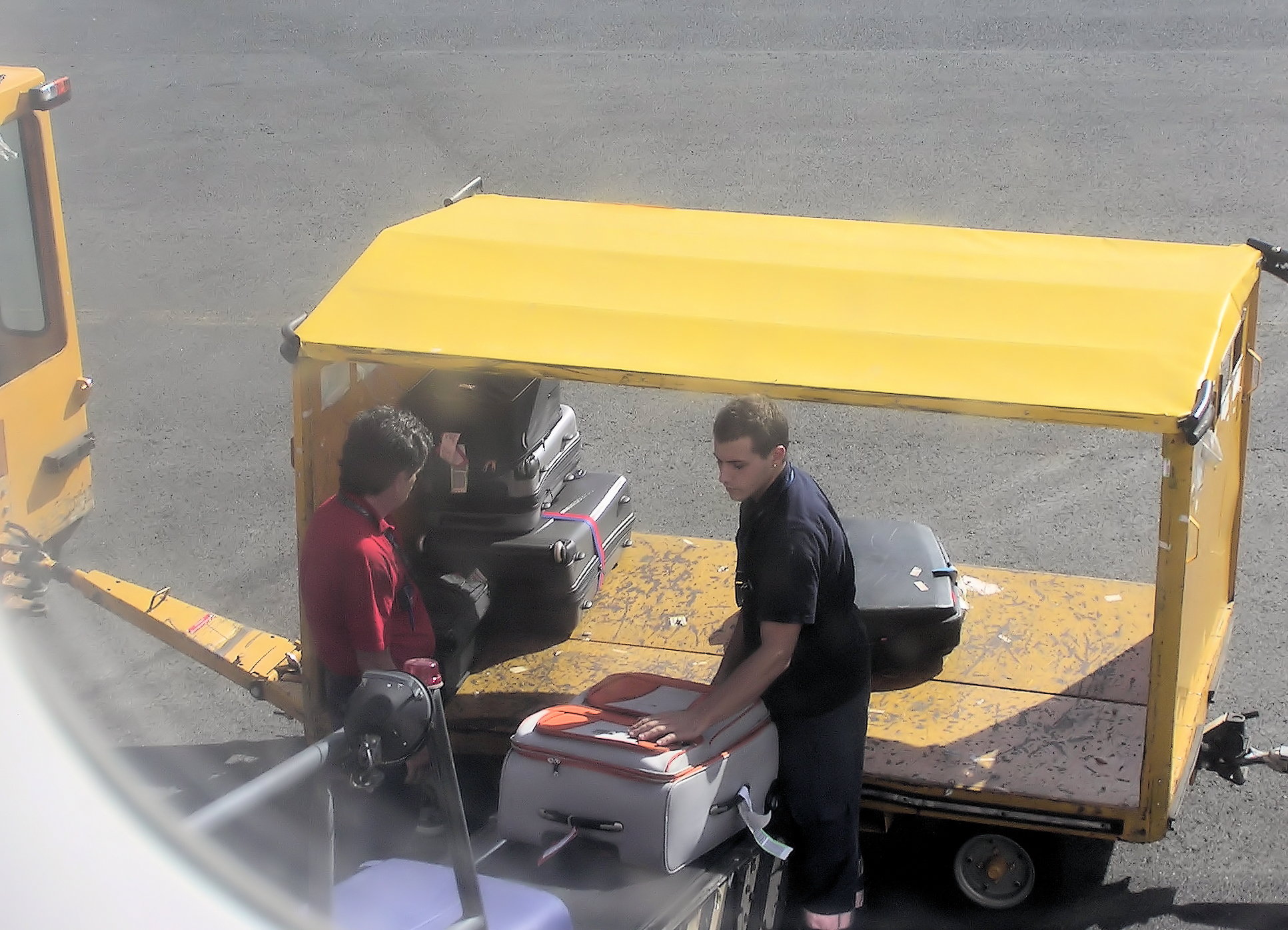
Baggage being loaded onto the conveyor of an EasyJet Airbus A319

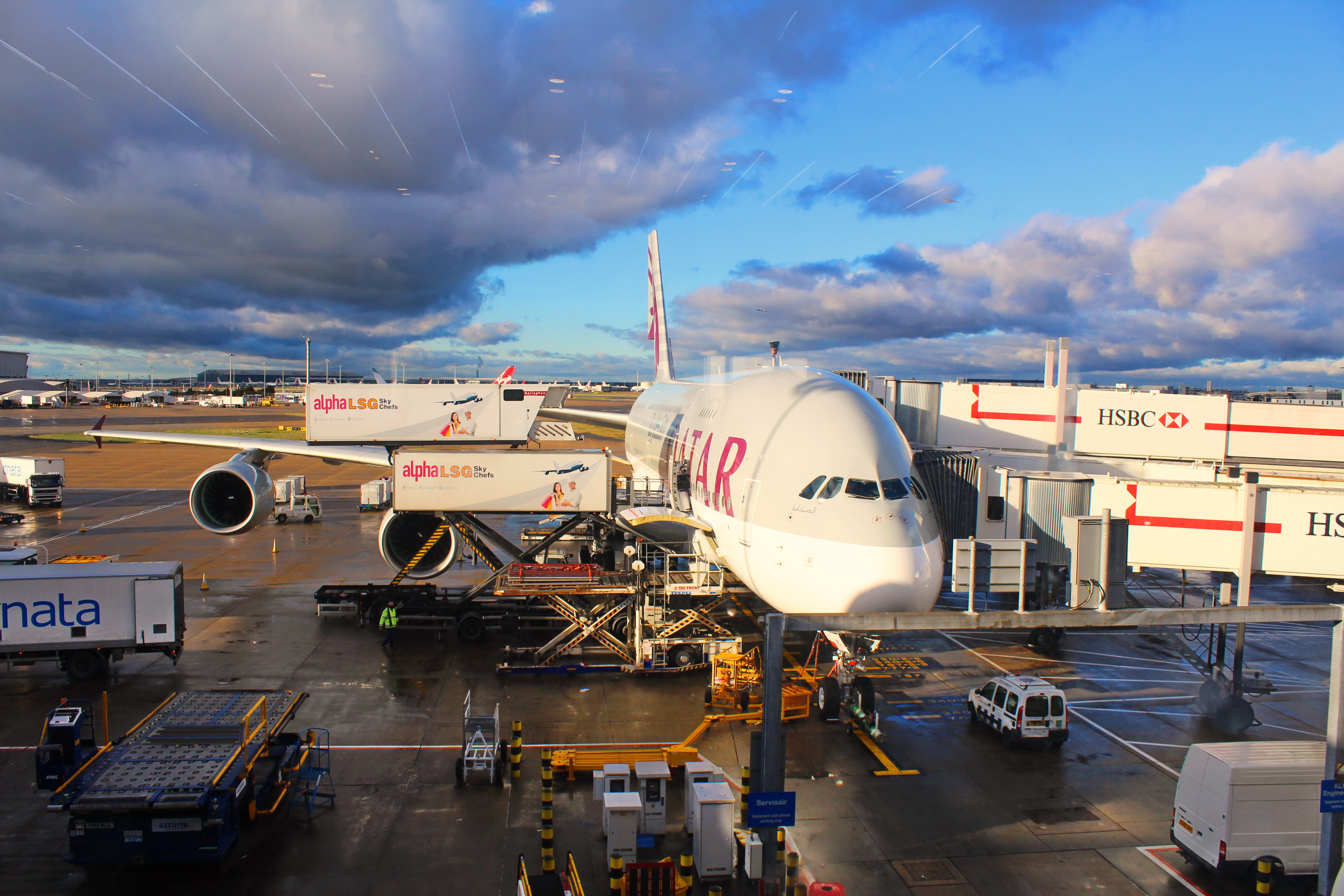
Airbus A380-800 operated by Qatar Airways on apron outside Heathrow Terminal 4 with a wide range of ground handling equipment around such as aircraft container, pallet loader, ULD, jet air starter, belt loader, pushback tug, catering vehicles and dollies.

A baggage handling system is a type of conveyor system installed in airports that transports checked luggage from ticket counters to areas where the bags can be loaded onto airplanes. A baggage handling system also transports checked baggage coming from airplanes to baggage claims or to an area where the bag can be loaded onto another airplane.

== History ==
The first automated baggage handling system was invented by BNP Associates in 1971, and this technology is in use in almost every major airport worldwide today.

== Process ==
Baggage handling system in operation

Bags are entered into the baggage handling system when an airline agent, or self-check system, assigns each of them a tag with a unique ten-digit barcode. Airlines are also now incorporating RFID chips into tags to track bags in real time and reduce the number of mishandled bags. The baggage handling system then scans and sorts the bags by airline, usually by means of Automatic Tag Readers (ATR). A series of diverters along the conveyor belt then directs the bags through the baggage handling area.

Although a baggage handling system's primary function is the sorting and transportation of bags, a typical system also:

- Detects bag jams
- Regulates input volume, to avoid overloading the system
- Balances loads, to evenly distribute bags between conveyor subsystems
- Counts and tracks bags

== Security ==
After September 11, 2001, the majority of airports around the world began to implement baggage screening directly into baggage handling systems. These systems are referred to as "Checked Baggage Inspection System" by the Transportation Security Administration (TSA) in the US, where bags are fed directly into Explosive Detection System (EDS) machines. A CBIS can sort baggage based on each bag's security status assigned by an EDS machine or by a security screening operator.
