= Abdülhamid Han =

Turkey-flagged ultra deepwater drillship

History

Turkey
- Name: Abdülhamid Han; Cobalt Explorer
- Namesake: Abdul Hamid II (r. 1876–1909), 34th Sultan of the Ottoman Empire
- Owner: Turkish Petroleum Corporation, TPAO (2021)
- Operator: Turkish Petroleum Corporation (TPAO)
- Ordered: 2013
- Builder: Daewoo Shipbuilding & Marine Engineering Co., Ltd (DSME), Okpo, Geoje, South Korea
- Launched: 2014
- Acquired: November 2021
- In service: August 2022
- Identification: IMO number: 9705093; MMSI Number 311021300; Call sign: TCA7090
- Status: active

General characteristics
- Tonnage: 66,429 GT; 61,450 DWT summer
- Length: 238 m (780 ft 10 in)
- Beam: 42 m (137 ft 10 in)
- Draft: 19 m (62 ft 4 in)
- Crew: 200

Abdülhamid Han (ex Cobalt Explorer) is a Turkey-flagged seventh-generation ultra deepwater drillship owned and operated by the Turkish Petroleum Corporation. She is Turkey's fourth drillship.

== History ==
The US oil and gas company Vantage Drilling International ordered the construction of the drillship in 2013, and prepaid US$59.5 million. She was built in 2014 by Daewoo Shipbuilding & Marine Engineering (DSME) at its shipyard in Okpo, Geoje, South Korea, and christened Cobalt Explorer. In August 2015, the construction deal was terminated by DSME due to contract breach by Vantage Drilling. The ship was worth about US$600 million at that time.

In May 2019, the Norwegian company Northern Drilling had an option to acquire Cobalt Explorer. The price of the ship had fallen to about US$350 million. She was renamed West Cobalt. However, the deal was cancelled in October the same year by the offshore driller due to fundamental breach of contract.

The state-owned oil and gas company, the Turkish Petroleum Corporation, TPAO, purchased the Bahamas-flagged idle drillship in November 2021 to add her to its drillship fleet of three sixth-generation drillships. The vessel departed from Okpo Port, South Korea early March 2022, sailed to Turkey and arrived at the Port of Taşucu in Silifke, Mersin mid May the same year. She was painted red/white with a big crescent and star of the Turkish flag on her prow. Work on equipment installation, technical procedures and certification was carried out before her planned commissioning in early August 2022.

== Name ==
The drillship is renamed in honor of Abdul Hamid II (r. 1876–1909), the 34th Sultan of the Ottoman Empire, like the three other drillships of the TPAO, Fatih (Mehmed II, known as Fatih, the "conqueror"), Yavuz (Selim I, known as yavuz, the "resolute") and Kanuni (Suleiman the Magnificent, known as Kanunî, the "lawgiver").

== Characteristics ==
Abdülhamid Han is a seventh-generation, advanced technology drillship (one of five in the world). The ship can operate in rough sea conditions and drill into high-pressure gas reservoirs. It is 238 m (781 ft) long, has a beam of 42 m (138 ft) and a draft of 19 m (62 ft). She has 66,429 GT at 61,450 DWT in summer.

It can drill to a total depth of 12,200 m (40,000 ft) in a maximum water depth of 3,657.5 m (12,000 ft), which is further than the Mariana Trench, the deepest place on earth. The vessel's drawworks of type AKMH Wirth GH 9000 EG is powered by a 6,700 kW (9,000 hp) motor featuring a hookload capacity of 1,100,000 kg (2,500,000 lb) at the 104 m (341 ft) high tower. The ship has a crew of 200.

The ship's identification number is IMO number: 9705093, MMSI Number 271050408 and the call sign is TCA7090.

== Mission ==
On 9 August 2022, the drillship was deployed from the Port of Taşucu to her first mission towards the "Yörükler-1" Well 55 km (30 nmi) off Gazipaşa, Antalya to explore hydrocarbon reserves in the Mediterranean Sea.

== See also ==
- Fatih (ex Deepsea Metro II), sister ship and Turkey's first drillship (2017)
- Yavuz (ex Deepsea Metro I), sister ship and Turkey's second drillship (2018)
- Kanuni (ex Sertao), Turkey's third drillship (2020)
