= USS Westwind =

Westwind has been the name of one ship of the United States Navy and one ship of the United States Coast Guard.

- USCGC Westwind, a Wind-class icebreaker of the United States Coast Guard.
- USNS Westwind (T-AGSE-2), a Black Powder-class support vessel.
