= Siba =

Siba or SIBA may refer to:

== Places ==
- Siba, Luocheng County, Guangxi, China, a town
- Siba State, a princely state of India until 1947
- Siba subdistrict, Basra Governorate, Iraq
- Šiba, a village in Bardejov District, Slovakia
- Siba Castle, a Sassanid castle in Kukherd District, Iran

== People ==
- Siba culture, a Bronze Age culture in China from the 14th to 11th century BC
- Sutanphaa or Siba Singha, king of Assam from 1714 to 1744
- Hajrudin Krvavac (1926–1992), Bosnian film director nicknamed "Šiba"
- Siba Mtongana (born 1984), South African chef, host of the TV show Siba's Table
- Siba Shakib, Iranian/German filmmaker, writer and political activist
- Siba (singer), Brazilian singer Sérgio Roberto Veloso de Oliveira (born 1969)
- Rhizlane Siba (born 1996), Moroccan track and field athlete
- Walter Siba, the third Anglican Bishop of Ysabel, Melanesia

== Acronyms ==
- SIBA (retailer), a Swedish home electronics retail chain, now Net On Net
- SIBA Elektrik G.m.b.H, also SIBA Electric Ltd, former manufacturers of the Dynastart combined starter motor and alternator
- Society of Independent Brewers, an association representing brewing companies in the United Kingdom
- Southern Independent Booksellers Alliance, a trade association representing booksellers in the United States

== Other uses ==
- Siba (GCHP Stone Run Afternoon Tea), Best in Show winner of the 2020 Westminster Kennel Club Dog Show
- Siba, a prototype character who did not make it into the Virtua Fighter video game series

== See also ==
- Sibah (born 1970), Bolivian singer-songwriter
