= USS Arrowhead =

Arrowhead has been the name of two ships of the United States Navy.

- USS Arrowhead (AD-35), a planned Shenandoah-class destroyer tender, was cancelled
- USNS Arrowhead (T-AGSE-4), a Black Powder-class support vessel.
