= TCG Yavuz =

TCG Yavuz is the name of the following ships of the Turkish Navy, named for Yavuz Sultan Selim:

- TCG Yavuz (1936), ex-SMS Goeben, a Moltke-class battlecruiser, acquired by the Ottoman Empire in 1914, commissioned in the Turkish Navy 1936–1950
- TCG Yavuz (F 240), lead Yavuz-class frigate, in commission since 1987

== See also ==
- Yavuz (drillship)
- Yavuz (name)
- Yavuz Sultan Selim (disambiguation)
