= Yavuz =

Yavuz may refer to:

- Yavuz (name), a Turkish given name and surname
  - Selim I, (1470–1520), nicknamed Yavuz, Sultan of the Ottoman Empire
- TCG Yavuz, ships of the Turkish Navy
- Yavuz-class frigate
- Yavuz (drillship)
- Yavuz (vehicle), a prototype of the Terrex infantry carrier vehicle
- Yavuz, Ardeşen, village in Rize Province, Turkey
- Yavuz, Emirdağ, village in Afyonkarahisar Province, Turkey

== See also ==
- Yavuz Sultan Selim (disambiguation)
