= Fatih (drillship) =

History

Turkey
- Name: Fatih; Deepsea Metro II (2011–2018)
- Namesake: Sultan Mehmed II, known as Fatih, "conqueror"
- Owner: Turkish Petroleum Corporation (TPAO); Chalfont Shipping (2016–2018); Chloe Marine (2011–2016)
- Operator: Turkish Petroleum Corporation (TPAO); Odfjell Drilling (2011–2018
- Builder: Hyundai Heavy Industries, Ulsan, South Korea
- Launched: 25 November 2011
- Identification: IMO number: 9503770; MMSI Number 271046008; Callsign TC3163
- Status: In active service

General characteristics
- Tonnage: 51,283 GT; 34,256 DWT
- Length: 229.19 m (751.9 ft)
- Beam: 36 m (118 ft)
- Draft: 16.1 m (53 ft)
- Speed: 7.2 kn (13.3 km/h) (service); 8.6 kn (15.9 km/h) (max)
- Armament: None

Fatih, ex Deepsea Metro II, is a Turkey-flagged sixth generation ultra deepwater drillship owned and operated by the state-owned Turkish Petroleum Corporation (TPAO). She is Turkey's first drillship.

== Name ==
Fatih means "Conqueror" in Turkish.

The four drillships of the state-owned Turkish gas company, Fatih, Yavuz, Kanuni and Abdulhamid Han, are named after the most famous conquerors and rulers of the Ottoman Empire: Mehmed I (r. 1444-1446, 1451-1481), Turkish: Fatih Sultan Mehmet, Mehmed the Conqueror, who conquered Constantinople; Selim I (r. 1512-1520), known as Selim the Resolute, Turkish: Yavuz Sultan Selim, who hugely expanded his empire; and Suleiman the Magnificent (r. 1520-1566), known in Turkish as Kanunî Sultan Süleyman ("the Lawgiver"), under whom the empire reached its apex; Abdülhamid (r.1876-1909) was the 34th sultan of the Ottoman Empire, and the last sultan to exert effective control over the fracturing state.

== History ==
Fatih was built by Hyundai Heavy Industries in Ulsan, South Korea at a cost of nearly US$ 860 million, and launched on 25 November 2011. Initially named Deepsea Metro II, she was owned by Chloe Marine in Hamilton, Bermuda and was operated by Odfjell Drilling in Bergen, Norway, sailing under a Marshall Islands flag until 2018. In early 2012, she sailed to South Africa to undergo modifications at the DCD-Dorbyl Marine shipyard in Cape Town.

From May 2012, she was active offshore Brazil for Petrobras. The three-year contract valued at US$ 531 million. In May 2015, the work concluded. The drill was stacked on the Curaçao island, Venezuela because no other orders were received for her service.

In March 2016, she was sold to Chalfont Shipping Ltd. for US$ 210 million.

At the end of 2017, she was purchased by the Türkiye Petrolleri Anonim Ortaklığı (TPAO), a company of the Ministry of Energy and Natural Resources and renamed Fatih ("Conqueror"). Fatih is expected to carry out deepwater drilling for petroleum and natural gas in the Black Sea and Mediterranean Sea. She is Turkey's first drillship. After completing the preparation works, she was commissioned in May 2018 to carry out drilling work in the Mediterranean Sea.

== Characteristics ==
The sixth generation ultra deepwater drillship is 229.19 m (751.9 ft) long, with a beam of 36 m (118 ft) and a draught of 16.1 m (53 ft). Assessed at 51,283 GT and 34,256 DWT, she has a maximum speed of 8.6 kn (15.9 km/h) and a speed of 7.2 kn (13.3 km/h) in service. The vessel is able to carry out drilling at a sea depth up to 8,000 ft (2,400 m) and has a maximum drill depth of 40,000 ft (12,000 m).

Following her arrival in Turkey, the vessel was equipped with Managed Pressure Drilling system after she was maintained. The drilling works of the vessel are supported by an in-Turkey-developed remotely operated underwater vehicle Kaşif.

== Exploration works ==
The vessel was commissioned on 29 October 2018 for deep-sea drilling at Alanya-1 field in Eastern Mediterranean Sea. Later, she was deployed to Finike-1 field in the same sea.

For drilling in Black Sea, the vessel passed through Bosphorus northwards on 29 May 2020 to Tuna-1 field. On 21 August 2020, it was announced that a natural gas reserve of 320 km^{3} (77 cu mi) was explored at the field she has been conducting drilling 170 km (110 mi) off Zonguldak since 20 July. Mid October 2020, it was announced that an additional gas reserve of 85 km^{3} (20 cu mi) was explored at 4,445 m (14,583 ft) depth. The total reserve explored at Tuna-1 field amounts so to 405 km^{3} (97 cu mi).

== See also ==
- Yavuz (ex Deepsea Metro I), sister ship and Turkey's second drillship (2018)
- Kanuni (ex Sertao), Turkey's third drillship (2020)
- Abdülhamid Han (ex Cobalt Explorer), Turkey's fourth drillship (2021)
