= Kanuni (drillship) =

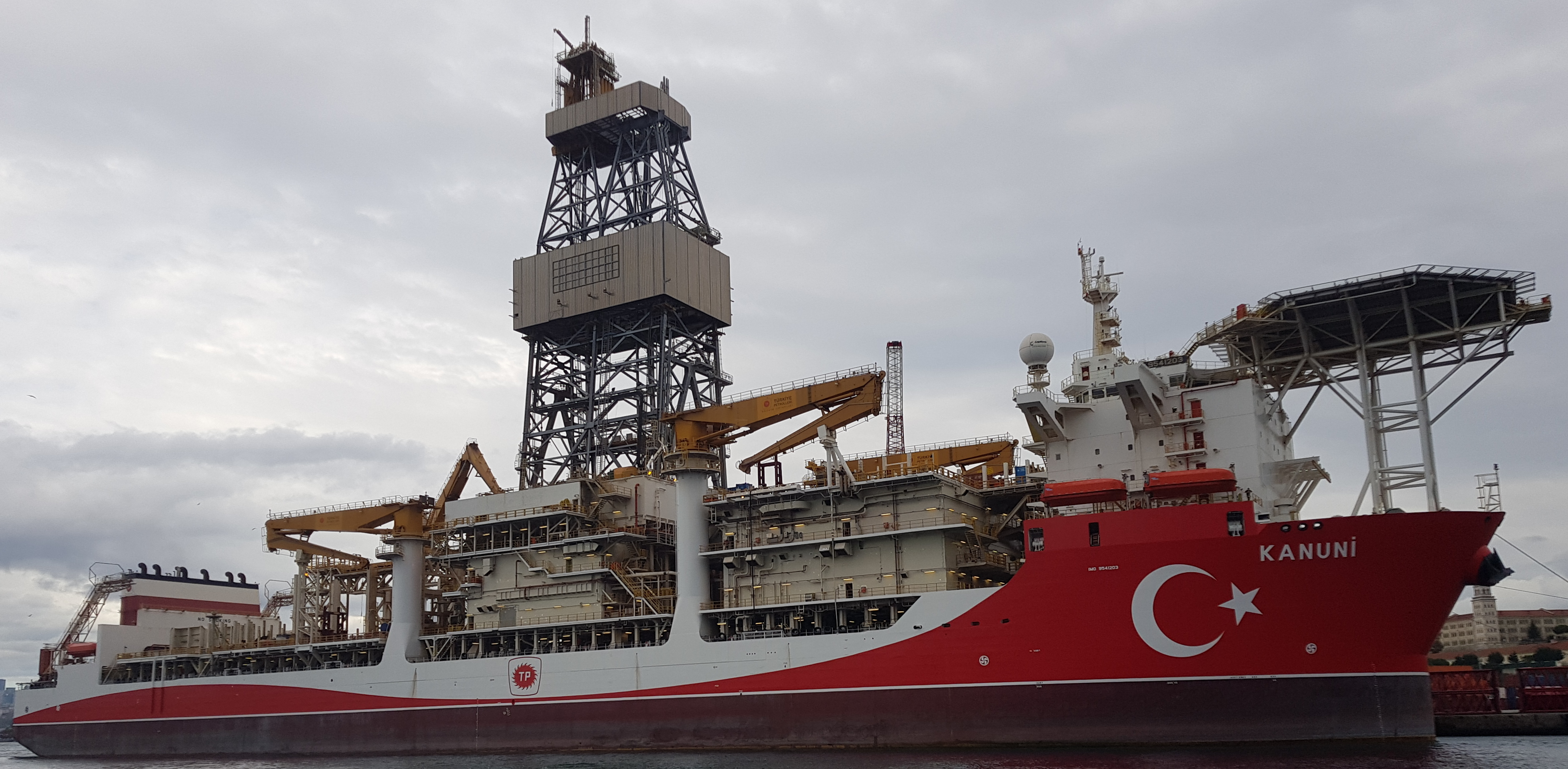

History

Turkey
- Name: Kanuni (2020); NS37 / Sertão (2017); Sertão (2013)
- Namesake: Suleiman the Magnificent, known as Kanunî, "lawgiver"
- Owner: Turkish Petroleum Corporation, TPAO (2020); Dlief Drilling (2015); Schahin Petroleum Gas (2012)
- Operator: Turkish Petroleum Corporation (TPAO); Petrobras 2012–2015
- Builder: Samsung Heavy Industries, Geoje, South Korea
- Launched: 2012
- In service: 2012–2015, 2020–
- Out of service: 2015–2020
- Identification: IMO number: 9541203; MMSI Number 538004418; Call sign: V7WX8
- Status: In active service

General characteristics
- Tonnage: 60,316 GT; 61,619 DWT
- Length: 227.81 m (747.4 ft)
- Beam: 42 m (138 ft)
- Draft: 14.5 m (48 ft)
- Armament: None

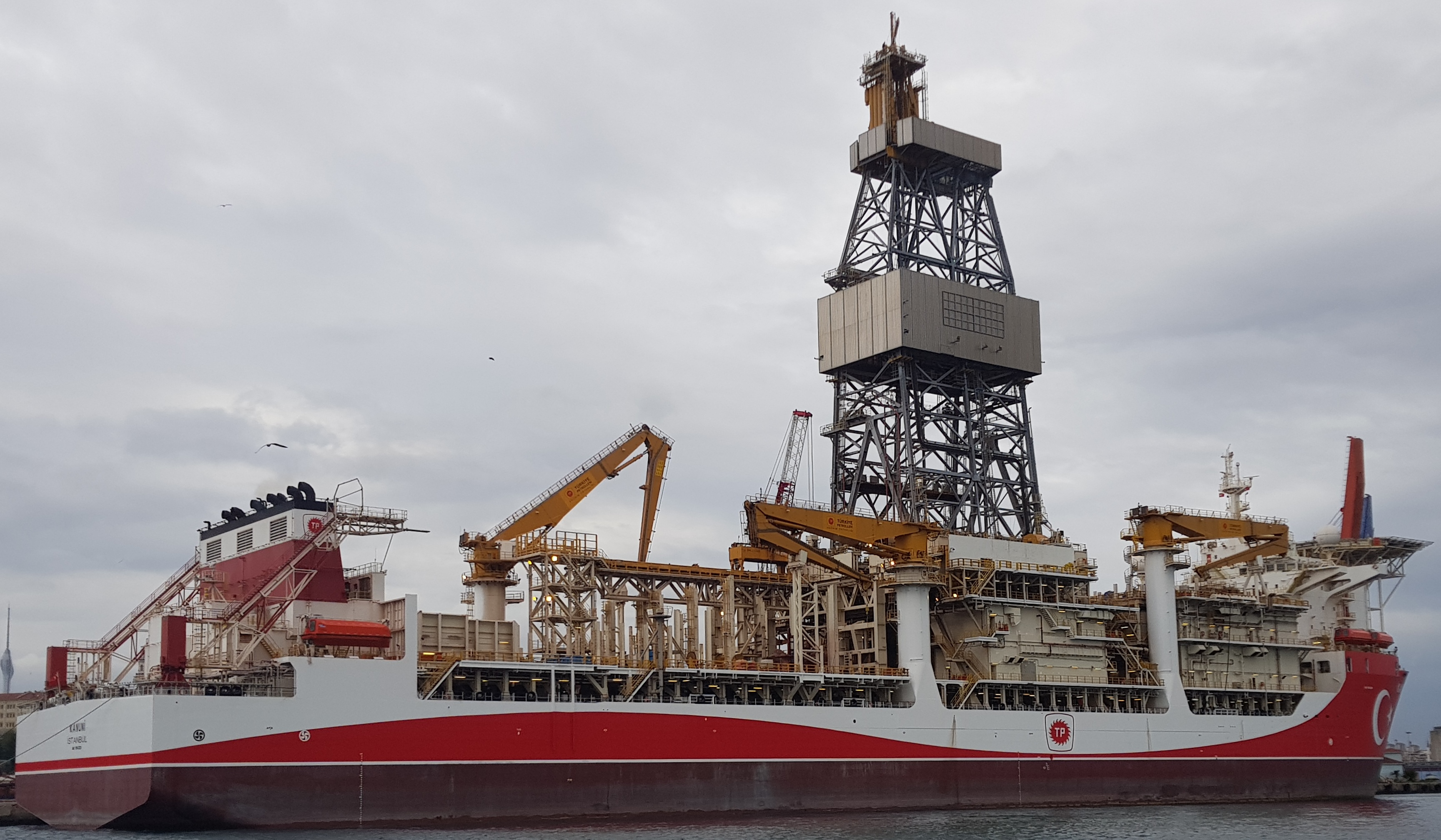
Ship backyard

Kanuni (ex NS37/ Sertão) is a Turkey-flagged sixth-generation ultra deepwater drillship owned and operated by the Turkish Petroleum Corporation. She is Turkey's third drillship.

== Name ==
Kanuni means "law-related", "legal" in Turkish and can be used in a wider range of related meanings. The word derives from Arabic قَانُون (qānūn), which comes from Ancient Greek κανών (kanṓn).

The three drillships of the state-owned Turkish gas company, Fatih, Yavuz and Kanuni, are named after the most famous conquerors and rulers of the Ottoman Empire: Mehmed II, Turkish: Fatih Sultan Mehmet, Mehmed the Conqueror, who conquered Constantinople in 1453; Selim I (r. 1512-1520), known as Selim the Resolute, Turkish: Yavuz Sultan Selim, who hugely expanded his empire; and Suleiman the Magnificent (r. 1520-1566), known in Turkish as Kanunî Sultan Süleyman ("the Lawgiver"), under whom the empire reached its apex.

== History ==
The ship was built in three years by Samsung Heavy Industries, Geoje, South Korea, and finished in 2012, and christened Sertão. She was worth around US$600 million. Owned by Schahin Petroleum Gas in Rio de Janeiro, Brazil, and flagged Marshall Islands with home port Majuro, she served for the Brazilian state-owned Petrobras between 2012 and 2015.

After the Schahin Group went bankrupt in April 2015, the U.S.-based Dleif Drilling became the new owner. The vessel then sailed from Brazil to Teesside, North East England, where she was arrested by the Admiralty court. The arrest of the vessel occurred to force the payment of the owner's debt. Dleif Drilling tasked the Dutch offshore consulting company Okeanos BV and the ship management company V-Ships Cyprus with PB Consultants Ltd from Scotland offshore brokering and advisory company Pareto Offshore AS of Norway to find a future employment. The vessel was then listed for sale. A purchase offer for the vessel in amount of US$75 million was rejected by late November 2016. In 2017, her name was changed to NS37 / Sertão.

After the vessel was idled and warm stacked for nearly two years, the Admiralty Marshal of the United Kingdom opened a request for tender in mid January 2020 that was run by the broker CW Kellock & Co. Ltd. The state-owned Turkish Petroleum Corporation, TPAO acquired the drillship for US$37.5 million winning the bidding. Renamed Kanuni, she arrived in the territorial waters of Turkey in Eastern Mediterranean on 13 March 2020 after her 18-day journey departing from Port Talbot in Wales, United Kingdom. Kanuni is the third drillship of Turkey after Fatih (ex Deepsea Metro II) and Yavuz (ex Deepsea Metro I).

== Characteristics ==
The sixth-generation ultra-deepwater drillship is 227.81 m (747.4 ft) long, has a beam of 42 m (138 ft), a draft of 14.5 m (48 ft), and her tonnage are 60,316 GT and 61,619 DWT. The vessel is able to carry out drilling high-pressure, high-temperature wells up to 11,400 m (37,400 ft) depth at a sea depth up to 3,000 m (9,800 ft) in pre-salt layer fields.

== See also ==
- Fatih (ex Deepsea Metro II), Turkey's first drillship (2017)
- Yavuz (ex Deepsea Metro I), Turkey's second drillship (2018)
- Abdülhamid Han (ex Cobalt Explorer), Turkey's fourth drillship (2021)
