= Adıyaman oil field =

Oil field in Adıyaman, Turkey

Coordinates: 37.7882968°N 38.2200557°E

Adıyaman
- Country: Turkey
- Region: Southeastern Anatolia Region
- Location: Adıyaman
- Offshore/onshore: onshore
- Operator: Türkiye Petrolleri Anonim Ortaklığı

Production
- Current production of oil: 800 barrels per day (~40,000 t/a)
- Estimated oil in place: 9.8 million tonnes (~ 11×10^{6} m^{3} or 72 million bbl)

The Adıyaman oil field is an oil field located in Adıyaman, Adıyaman Province, Southeastern Anatolia Region. It was discovered in 1982 and developed by Türkiye Petrolleri Anonim Ortaklığı. It began production in 1985 and produces oil. The total proven reserves of the Adıyaman oil field are around 72 million barrels (9.8 million tonnes), and production is centered on 800 barrels per day (130 m^{3}/d).
