= James L. Dennis =

American judge (born 1936)

James Dennis

Senior Judge of the United States Court of Appeals for the Fifth Circuit
- Incumbent
- Assumed office December 16, 2022

Judge of the United States Court of Appeals for the Fifth Circuit
- In office October 2, 1995 – December 16, 2022
- Appointed by: Bill Clinton
- Preceded by: Charles Clark
- Succeeded by: Dana Douglas

Personal details
- Born: James Leon Dennis; January 9, 1936 (age 90) Monroe, Louisiana, U.S.
- Party: Democratic
- Education: Louisiana Tech University (BA); Louisiana State University (JD); University of Virginia (LLM)

James Leon Dennis (born January 9, 1936) is an American lawyer, jurist, and former politician serving as a senior United States circuit judge of the United States Court of Appeals for the Fifth Circuit, with chambers in New Orleans, Louisiana.

== Early life and education ==
Born in Monroe in Ouachita Parish, Louisiana, to Jenner Leon Dennis (1901–1970) and the former Hope Taylor, Dennis served in the United States Army from 1955 to 1957 and was affiliated with the American Legion. In 1959, he received a Bachelor of Arts degree from Louisiana Tech University in Ruston. In 1962, he obtained a Juris Doctor from the Paul M. Hebert Law Center in Baton Rouge. In 1984, he earned a Master of Laws from the University of Virginia School of Law in Charlottesville, Virginia. He was named to the Order of the Coif.

== Career ==
From 1962 to 1972, he worked in private practice with the law firm of Hudson, Potts & Bernstein in Monroe, Louisiana. He served as a Democratic member of the Louisiana House of Representatives from 1968 to 1972. He was succeeded in that position by his fellow Democrat-turned-Republican, John C. Ensminger, a Monroe businessman.

=== State judicial service ===
Dennis became a judge on the Fourth Judicial District Court of Louisiana, based in Monroe and served for two years from 1972 to 1974. He then served on the Louisiana Circuit Court of Appeal for the Second Circuit, based in Shreveport, from 1974 to 1975. From 1975 to 1995, he was an associate justice of the seven-member Louisiana Supreme Court.

=== Federal judicial service ===
On January 31, 1995, Dennis was nominated by President Bill Clinton to a seat on the United States Court of Appeals for the Fifth Circuit vacated by Charles Clark. Dennis was confirmed by the United States Senate on September 28, 1995, and received his commission on October 2, 1995. Dennis announced that he will assume senior status upon confirmation of his successor. He assumed senior status on December 16, 2022. Dennis took inactive senior status on February 23, 2026.

Dennis is liberal relative to the Fifth Circuit overall, and has at times been in conflict with conservative judges such as Chief Judge Edith Jones and Judge Edith Brown Clement.

Dennis's former law clerks include John Bel Edwards, the 56th governor of Louisiana, and Harlin D. Hale, the former chief judge of the United States Bankruptcy Court for the Northern District of Texas.

== Notable cases ==
=== Abortion ===
In 2014, Dennis wrote a 62-page dissent when the 5th Circuit denied an en banc rehearing for a Texas abortion law, which a 3 judge panel had upheld. The 5th Circuit was overturned by the Supreme Court in Whole Woman's Health v. Hellerstedt in 2016.

On January 18, 2019, in June Medical Services, LLC v. Gee, Dennis wrote a 19-page dissent when the 5th Circuit refused to rehear a case regarding Louisiana's abortion restrictions. Dennis found that Act 620 was intended to restrict abortions, not to further women's health. Dennis also found it similar to the Texas abortion ban in 2016. Dennis also saw these restrictions as a violation of Roe v. Wade, burdensome for women who need abortions, and depriving women of a constitutionally protected healthcare right. Dennis's dissent included noting that "70% of women seeking abortions in Louisiana would be unable to obtain one" which would be "an undue burden on a large fraction of women." Dennis' dissent was joined by Patrick Higginbotham, James E. Graves Jr., and Stephen A. Higginson.

On March 30, 2020, Dennis dissented when the 5th Circuit permitted Texas' abortion ban to go on in the wake of COVID-19. Dennis wrote: "A federal judge has already concluded that irreparable harm would flow from allowing the Executive Order to prohibit abortions during this critical time. I would deny the stay. Moreover, I write separately to make clear that, per the Executive Order, “any procedure that, if performed in accordance with the commonly accepted standard of clinical practice, would not deplete the hospital capacity or the personal protective equipment needed to cope with the COVID-19 disaster” is exempt."

In the August 19, 2021 decision Whole Woman's Health v. Ken Paxton, Dennis dissented when a majority of the judges voted to uphold a law that bans a "dilation and evacuation", a common procedure used in second term abortions. Dennis's 40 page dissent concluded with "And while the plurality laments the amount of time SB8 has been enjoined, that is time in which women in Texas were shielded from the ill effects of a law that is clearly unconstitutional in light of Stenberg, 530 U.S. at 938-39, and the great burdens the statute places on abortion access with exceedingly few reciprocal benefits. That the shield is withdrawn today and that women in Texas will be forced to undergo invasive and unsafe techniques to exercise their constitutional right to an abortion—if it does not prevent their exercising that right altogether—is a devastating blow to their self-determination. I hope only that this opinion gives voice to a modicum of their frustration, anger, and pain. Once again, I respectfully but emphatically dissent."

=== Asbestos-related death ===
Dennis dissented in a May 27, 2014 decision that denied relief to a husband whose wife died from mesothelioma due to asbestos fibers on her husband's work clothes. Dennis concluded that she was not given proper notice about proceedings against her husband's company, and even if she had been given proper notice, she was unaware of her exposure to asbestos and the health effects caused by the chemical.

=== Death penalty ===
In 2013, Dennis dissented when the Fifth Circuit, by an 11–4 vote, let stand a panel order that held that death row inmate Christopher Sepulvado did not have a constitutional right to notice of the drug or combination of drugs that would be used to execute him. Sepulvado had sued to obtain notice of the drug protocol so that he could evaluate whether it complied with the Constitution. Dennis held: "Without such notice, Sepulvado would be subject to a death warrant and execution by lethal injection by a substance or combination of substances that might cause unnecessary pain and suffering during the execution in violation of the Eighth Amendment's Cruel and Unusual Punishments Clause—an inalterable, grievous loss entitling him, at a minimum, to notice and an opportunity to object. If Sepulvado were not given such notice before his execution takes place, there is absolutely no possibility of a post-deprivation hearing or any opportunity to be heard 'at a meaningful time and in a meaningful manner.'"

Dennis dissented when the 5th circuit, by a 10–7 vote, approved the exclusion of expert evidence in a case where a mother was sentenced to death for allegedly murdering her two-year-old daughter. The dissenters argued that given her history of having been abused, her confession at interrogation should have been reviewed by a psychologist who "would have testified that Lucio was a "battered woman"". The decision was handed down on February 9, 2021.

In Ramirez v. Collier, the 5th circuit allowed John Ramirez's execution to proceed despite the denial of his wish to have a spiritual advisor at the execution. The execution was scheduled for the night of September 8, 2021. Dennis strongly dissented, writing that "In denying a stay of execution, the majority fails to heed the Supreme Court’s recent guidance, with the troubling result that Ramirez may very well suffer the irreparable injury of being executed in a manner that violates his religious rights before a court is able to adjudicate his claims on the merits." On September 8, The Supreme Court granted Ramirez a stay of execution. On March 24, 2022, the Supreme Court reversed the Fifth Circuit and agreed with Dennis's dissent that depriving Ramirez of his spiritual advisor was unlawful.

=== Environment ===
As a justice of the Louisiana Supreme Court, Dennis wrote the opinion of the Court in Save Ourselves, Inc. v. Louisiana Environmental Control Commission. The case construed Article IX, § 1 of the Constitution of Louisiana, which provides for the protection and conservation of the state's air, water, and natural resources; Dennis himself had been coordinator of the Louisiana Constitutional Revision Commission and a delegate of the 1973 Louisiana Constitutional Convention prior to his ascent to the Louisiana Supreme Court. Dennis held that this section of the state constitution "requires an agency or official, before granting approval of proposed action affecting the environment, to determine that adverse environmental impacts have been minimized or avoided as much as possible consistently with the public welfare." The Court vacated and remanded the lower courts' approval of hazardous waste disposal permits issued by the state's Environmental Control Commission, finding that it was not clear from the record "whether the agency performed its duty to see that the environment would be protected to the fullest extent possible consistent with the health, safety, and welfare of the people."

Dennis was one of three judges on a Fifth Circuit panel that heard the appeal to Hornbeck Offshore Services LLC v. Salazar, a case challenging the U.S. Department of the Interior six month moratorium on exploratory drilling in deep water that was adopted in the wake of the Deepwater Horizon explosion and the subsequent oil spill. The Fifth Circuit panel denied the government's emergency request to stay the lower court's decision pending appeal.

=== Fourth Amendment ===
In a 2000 decision, Dennis dissented when the 5th circuit ruled that someone's 4th amendment rights are not violated when they are arrested for driving without a seatbelt. The 5th circuit was affirmed in Atwater v. City of Lago Vista, but four Justices agreed with Dennis in dissent.

=== Freedom of speech ===
Bell v. Itawamba County School Board was a case regarding student speech. Bell, an African-American male student, made a rap song criticizing two white coaches who allegedly sexually harassed African-American female students. His rap had profanity, including the n-word. Upon finding out of this rap, the school suspended him. Bell sued, arguing that his rap was free speech under Tinker v. Des Moines School District. Dennis ruled that Bell's rap is protected speech under Tinker and the school violated his 1st amendment rights by suspending him. However, the 5th circuit sitting en banc reversed Dennis in August 2015. Dennis wrote a 50-page dissent, writing that "Bell’s song was not a disruption of school activities but rather was an effort to participate as a citizen in our unique constitutional democracy by raising awareness of a serious matter of public concern. Yet, rather than commending Bell’s efforts, the Itawamba County School Board punished him for the content of his speech, in effect teaching Bell that the First Amendment does not protect students who challenge those in power."

In 2021, Dennis wrote the majority opinion in another student speech case, Oliver v. Arnold. Oliver was a high school student who objected to reciting the Pledge of Allegiance. According to Oliver, she was required to transcribe the words of the Pledge as part of an assignment given by her sociology teacher. Although the teacher claimed the assignment had a pedagogical purpose, Oliver claimed that it was intended to be a mandatory statement of patriotic beliefs. Oliver claimed that her First Amendment rights were violated. Dennis, speaking for the Court, held that the facts of the case were genuinely disputed and allowed Oliver's lawsuit to proceed.

Dennis dissented in Alliance for Good Government v. Coalition for Better Government, opining that the First Amendment protected a non-profit political organization from being held liable for trademark infringement under the Lanham Act based solely on its non-commercial, "purely political speech." Dennis warned that such an extension of liability "risks eroding the First Amendment's safeguards for political expression."

After the 5th circuit held that a judge had the right to exercise courtroom prayer, Dennis was one of 3 judges who voted to hear the case en banc.

On June 20, 2025, Dennis was on a three-judge panel that unanimously struck down a Louisiana law requiring the Ten Commandments to be placed in classrooms. Dennis wrote a concurring opinion arguing that Kennedy v. Bremerton School District did not fully overrule Lemon v. Kurtzman. On February 20, 2026, Dennis dissented when the 5th circuit sitting en banc reversed the panel and permitted the Louisiana "Ten Commandments law" to remain in place.

=== Gender identity ===
In January 2020, Dennis filed a "blistering" dissent when Judge Kyle Duncan denied a transgender prisoner's appeal to update her document to include her preferred gender pronouns. Judge Duncan went further and construed the prisoner's motion as seeking to require the District Court and the government to refer to the prisoner with female pronouns as well. Duncan ruled against this request, writing that compelling "the use of particular pronouns at the invitation of litigants ... could raise delicate questions about judicial impartiality." Dennis opined that the majority misconstrued the prisoner's request and was issuing an improper "advisory opinion." Dennis wrote that, "Ultimately, the majority creates a controversy where there is none," and that "Such an advisory opinion is inappropriate, unnecessary, and beyond the purview of federal courts." Dennis further stated that he would have granted the request to refer to the prisoner by her preferred pronouns. Duncan's opinion referred to the prisoner with male pronouns, while Dennis's dissent referred to her with female pronouns.

=== Medicaid ===
On November 23, 2020, Dennis wrote a 25-page dissent when the 5th circuit, by an 11–5 vote, permitted Texas and Louisiana to cut Medicaid funding from Planned Parenthood. Dennis warned: "I respectfully call on my colleagues to heed the admonitions of the June Medical Court and Chief Justice Roberts, to apply the principles of stare decisis “to keep the scale of justice even and steady, and not liable to waver with every new judge’s opinion,” June Med. Servs. L.L.C., 140 S. Ct. at 2134 (Roberts, C.J., concurring in the judgment) (quoting 1 W. Blackstone, Commentaries on the Laws of England 69 (1765)), and to reconsider its decision to overrule circuit precedent and eviscerate Medicaid patients’ freedom of choice." (Dennis, J., dissenting)

=== Native Americans ===
On August 9, 2019, Dennis wrote the majority opinion in a case that upheld the constitutionality of the Indian Child Welfare Act (ICWA). Dennis was joined by Jacques L. Wiener, Jr., while Judge Priscilla Owen dissented in part. In Brackeen v. Haaland on March 25, 2021, his judgment was affirmed in part and reversed in part. Dennis wrote the part of the majority opinion that held that parts of the ICWA are constitutional. He dissented regarding the parts of the ICWA that a majority of the en banc 5th circuit struck down; Dennis, along with Judges Wiener, Stewart, Graves, Higginson, and Costa, argued that the entire ICWA is constitutional. Dennis's March 2021 opinion totaled 153 pages in length.

=== Qualified immunity ===
Dennis wrote the May 3, 2022 majority opinion ruling that a police officer is not entitled to absolute immunity as a prosecutor would be. The police officers at hand allegedly fabricated evidence leading to a conviction, which was thrown out in Wearry v. Cain. James C. Ho wrote a dubitante opinion. On October 27, 2022, the entire 5th circuit denied en banc by a 9–7 vote, with Dennis and Ho both voting to deny en banc.

=== Securities litigation ===
Dennis dissented in Oscar Private Equity Investments v. Allegiance Telecom, Inc., a securities class action. In Oscar, the Fifth Circuit majority vacated the lower court's certification of the plaintiff class, holding that the plaintiffs were required to prove "loss causation" (that the defendant's alleged misrepresentations actually moved the market and caused the plaintiffs' financial losses) in order to invoke a presumption that they relied on the defendants' misstatements. Dennis accused the majority of engaging in "a breathtaking revision of securities class action procedure that eviscerates Basic's fraud-on-the-market presumption," a reference to Basic Inc. v. Levinson in which the Supreme Court previously held that reliance may be presumed where the alleged misrepresentations were public and material, the stock traded in an efficient market, and the relevant transaction took place between the time the misrepresentations were made and the time the truth was revealed. The Supreme Court unanimously abrogated Oscar in Erica P. John Fund, Inc. v. Halliburton Co., holding, similar to Dennis's dissent, that the Fifth Circuit's rule "contravenes Basic's fundamental premise."

=== Voting rights ===
On July 20, 2016, Dennis was in a narrow majority that struck down SB 14, Texas's voter ID law. In a concurring opinion, Dennis stated that he would go further than the majority; in his view, SB 14 was enacted with a racially discriminatory purpose.

On May 17, 2021, Dennis was one of three judges who ruled that a Louisiana judge's September 2020 order that expanded mail balloting and early voting is now moot because the 2020 election has passed.

Dennis dissented in an August 24, 2022 ruling that upheld a 1890 Mississippi law that disenfranchised a large number of felons. Dennis and the other liberals joined an opinion written by James E. Graves, Jr. that called the law out for its racist history. On August 4, 2023, Dennis wrote a 2–1 majority opinion striking down the lifetime voting ban. On July 18, 2024, Dennis dissented when the full court en banc reversed his 2023 ruling and allowed the lifetime voting ban to remain in place.

On August 14, 2025, Dennis and Irma Carrillo Ramirez ruled that Louisiana maps “packed” and “cracked” Black communities, unlawfully diluting Black voters’ power to elect their preferred candidates under Section 2 of the Voting Rights Act.

Legal offices
Preceded by Charles Clark	Judge of the United States Court of Appeals for the Fifth Circuit; 1995–2022	Succeeded by Dana Douglas
