= Shallow water drilling =

Process of oil and gas exploration and production in less than 500 feet of water

Shallow water drilling is the process of oil and gas exploration and production in less than 150 meters (500 feet) of water.

Shallow water drilling differs from deepwater drilling in several key aspects. Shallow water rigs have legs that reach the bottom of the sea floor and have blowout preventers (BOPs) above the surface of the water that are accessible for inspection, maintenance and repair, and can be controlled either remotely or manually in case of an emergency. Shallow water wells primarily produce natural gas, and are drilled in known areas and mature reservoirs.

Following the Deepwater Horizon oil spill, the U.S Department of the Interior imposed a moratorium on all offshore drilling, both deepwater and shallow water. The ban on shallow water drilling was lifted in May 2010. However, new regulations imposed on shallow water drilling have slowed the issuance of permits for new shallow water wells. Shallow water operators have called this permit slowdown a "de facto moratorium" that has forced them to idle rig workers and decrease production.

== See also ==
- 2010 United States deepwater drilling moratorium
- Deepwater drilling
