= Yavuz (name) =

Given and surname list

- Gender: Male

Origin
- Language: Turkish
- Meaning: inflexible, resolute, ferocious

Other names
- Related names: Korkut

Yavuz is a common masculine Turkish given name and in Turkish, Yavuz means 'inflexible', 'resolute' and 'ferocious'.

== Etymology ==
The Old Turkic intervocalic or stem-final b, represented by the bilabial w in Karakhanid and Khorezmian Turkic, is changed to v. Thus Yavuz comes from Old Turkic: yabïz (𐰖𐰉𐰕), Old Uyghur: yabīz or yawīz, Khorezmian: yawuz meaning 'bad, vile'.

== Given name ==
- Selim I (1470–1520), nicknamed Yavuz, Sultan of the Ottoman Empire
- Yavuz Ağralı (born 1992), Turkish long-distance runner
- Yavuz Ali Pasha (fl. 1601–1604), Ottoman statesman
- Yavuz Ataç, Turkish intelligence official
- Yavuz Aygün (born 1996), Turkish footballer
- Yavuz Can (born 1987), Turkish sprinter
- Yavuz Çetin (1970–2001), Turkish musician
- Yavuz Çoker (born 1936), Turkish footballer
- Yavuz Eraydın (born 1976), Turkish footballer
- Yavuz Baydar, Turkish journalist
- Yavuz Bingöl (born 1964), Turkish actor
- Yavuz Görey (1912–1995), Turkish sculptor
- Yavuz İlnam (born 1987), Turkish trap shooter
- Yavuz Karamollaoğlu (born 1980), Turkish karate practitioner
- Yavuz Mildon (born 1955), Turkish politician
- Yavuz Özkan (director) (1942–2019), Turkish film director
- Yavuz Özkan (footballer) (born 1985), Turkish footballer
- Yavuz Papağan (born 1987), Turkish para-archer
- Yavuz Selekman (1937–2004), Turkish wrestler
- Yavuz Şimşek (born 1947), Turkish footballer
- Yavuz Tatış (born 1947), Turkish businessman
- Yavuz Turgul (born 1946), Turkish film director and screenwriter
- Yavuz Yapıcıoğlu (born 1967), Turkish serial killer and arsonist
- Yavuz Yolcu (born 1966), Turkish judoka

== Middle name ==
- Abdurrahman Yavuz Kalkan (born 1973), Turkish footballer
- Ali Yavuz Kol (born 2001), Turkish footballer

== Surname ==
- Birsen Yavuz (born 1980), Turkish sprinter
- Burak Yavuz (born 1975), Turkish volleyball player
- Ece Yağmur Yavuz (born 2004), Turkish female artistic gymnast
- Erdinç Yavuz (born 1978), Turkish footballer
- Evin Demirhan Yavuz (born 1995), Turkish wrestler
- Fatma Nur Yavuz (born 1997), Turkish badminton player
- Fehmi Yavuz (1912–1991), Turkish bureaucrat, academic and writer
- Gizem Yavuz (born 1988), Turkish basketballer
- Hakan Yavuz (born 1960), Turkish basketballer and coach
- Haydar Yavuz (born 1994), Turkish wrestler
- İbrahim Yavuz (born 1982), Turkish footballer
- Mahmut Yavuz (born 1982), Turkish navy officer and ultramarathon runner
- Mehmet Yavuz (1973–2019), Kurdish politician and teacher
- M. Hakan Yavuz (born 1964), Turkish political scientist and historian
- Mustafa Yavuz (born 1994), Austrian footballer
- Şakir Yavuz (born 1968), German executive and philanthropist
- Yüksel Yavuz (born 1964), Turkish-born Kurdish film director
- Jay-Jay Okocha (born 1973) has surname Yavuz in his Turkish passport

== See also ==
- Yavuz (disambiguation)
- Yavuz Sultan Selim (disambiguation)
