= Hornbeck =

Hornbeck can refer to any of the following:

== People ==
- John Westbrook Hornbeck (1804–1848), American politician
- Shawn Hornbeck (born 1991), American kidnap victim
- William Hornbeck (1901–1983), American film editor

== Places ==
- Hornbeck, Louisiana, United States
- Hornbeck, Alberta, Canada

== Other uses ==
- Hornbeck Offshore Services
- E. K. Hornbeck, fictional character in Inherit the Wind (play)
