= Deep sea drilling =

Deep sea drilling may refer to:

- Deep Sea Drilling Project
- Offshore drilling
- Deepwater drilling
