= USNS Black Powder =

U.S. Navy Black Powder-class submarine support vessel

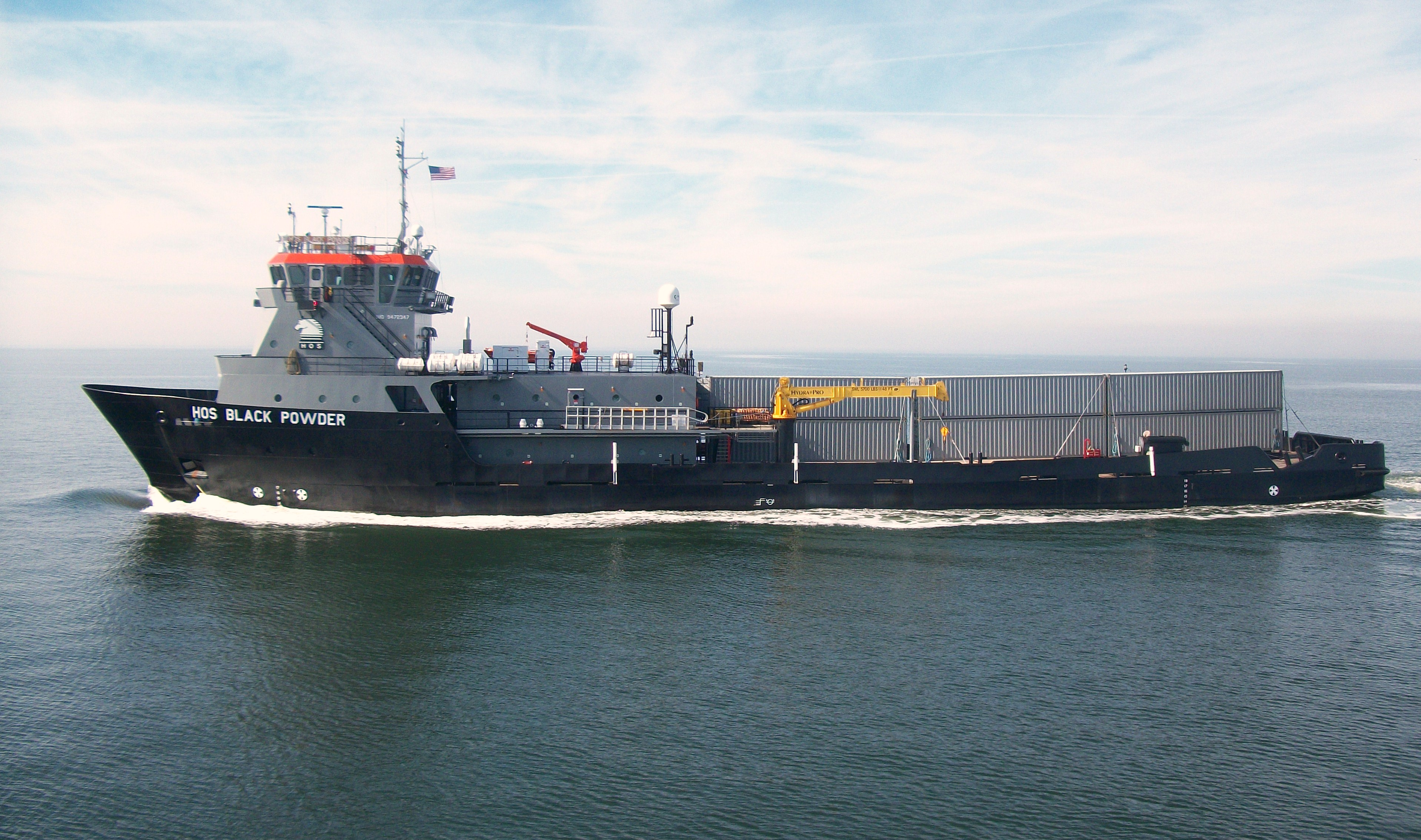

History

United States
- Name: Black Powder
- Namesake: Gunpowder
- Operator: Hornbeck Offshore Services; (2009-2015); Military Sealift Command; (2015-present)
- Builder: Leevec Industries, Jennings, Louisiana
- Launched: 2009
- Identification: IMO number: 9472347; MMSI number: 367334310; Callsign: WDE311; Pennant number: T-AGSE-1
- Status: Active

General characteristics
- Class & type: Black Powder-class submarine and special warfare support vessel
- Length: 250 ft (76 m)
- Beam: 54 ft (16 m)
- Draft: 15 ft (4.6 m)
- Propulsion: Diesel
- Speed: 14 knots (26 km/h; 16 mph)
- Armament: 2 × Mk 38 Mod 2 25 mm autocannon; Crew-served Browning M2 machine guns

USNS Black Powder (T-AGSE-1) is a Black Powder-class submarine support vessel acquired by the U.S. Navy in 2015 and assigned to Military Sealift Command.

== Construction ==
Black Powder was built in 2009 by Leevec Industries, Jennings, Louisiana, for Hornbeck Offshore Services.

== See also ==
- List of Military Sealift Command ships
