= USNS Eagleview =

2009 Black Powder-class support vessel

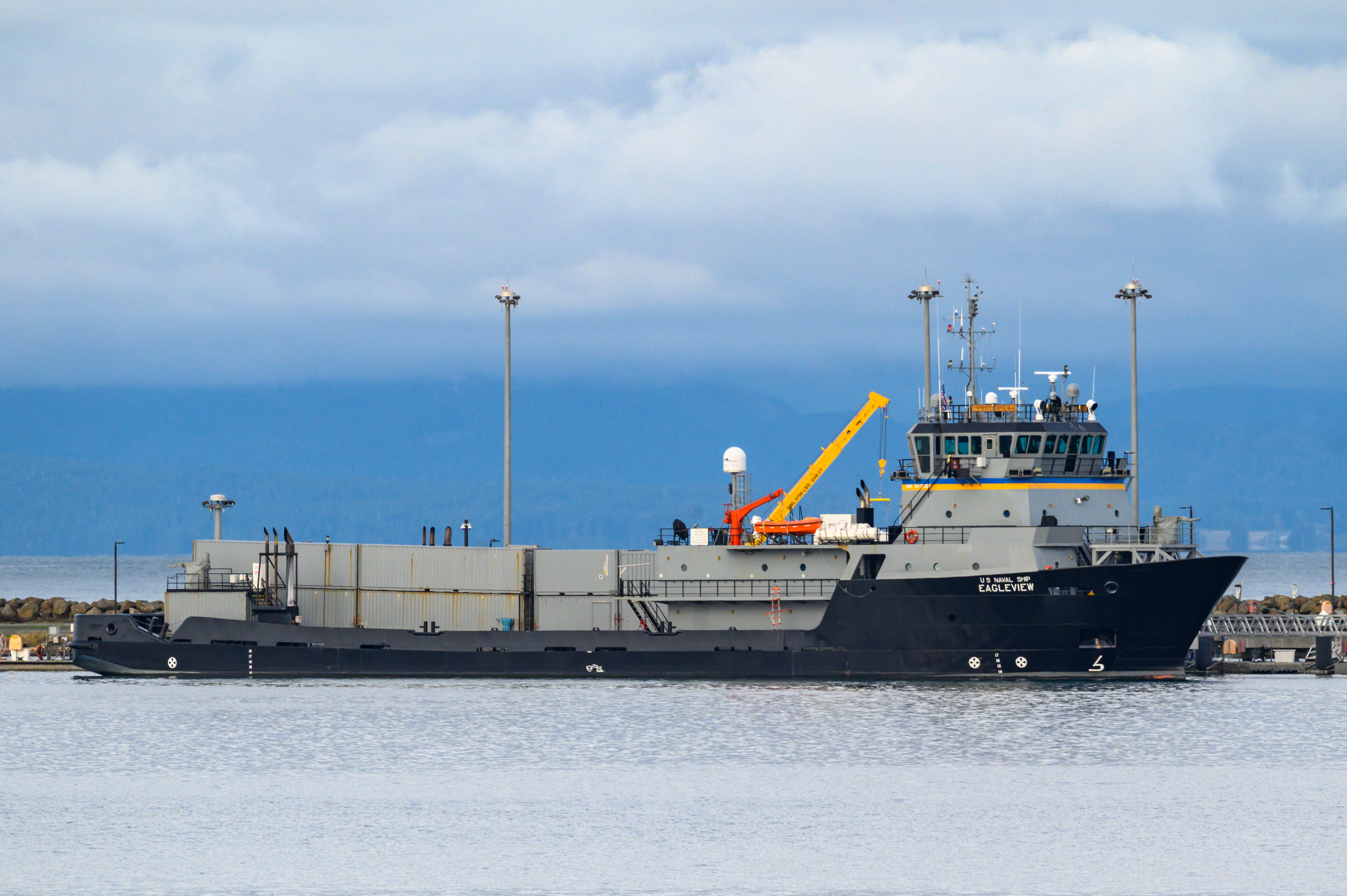

History

United States
- Name: USNS Eagleview
- Operator: Military Sealift Command
- Builder: Leevec Industries, Jennings, Louisiana
- Launched: 2009
- Home port: Port Angeles, Washington
- Identification: IMO number: 9472361; MMSI number: 368926302; Callsign: NEAG
- Status: Active

General characteristics
- Class & type: Submarine and Special Warfare Support Vessels
- Length: 250 ft (76 m)
- Beam: 54 ft (16 m)
- Draft: 15 ft (4.6 m)
- Propulsion: Diesel
- Speed: 14 knots (26 km/h; 16 mph)
- Armament: none

USNS Eagleview (T-AGSE-3) is a Black Powder-class submarine and special warfare support vessel acquired by the U.S. Navy in 2015 and assigned to Military Sealift Command.

== Construction ==
Eagleview was built in 2009 by Leevec Industries, Jennings, Louisiana, for Hornbeck Offshore.

== See also ==
- List of Military Sealift Command ships
- Media related to IMO 9472361 at Wikimedia Commons
