= Hornbeck Offshore Services LLC v. Salazar =

Hornbeck Offshore Services v. Salazar is an ongoing case in United States federal court. In the wake of the Deepwater Horizon explosion and the subsequent oil spill, the U.S. Department of the Interior issued a six-month moratorium on exploratory drilling in deep water. Plaintiffs filed suit challenging the moratorium.

== Background ==
In May 2010 the U.S. Department of the Interior issued a moratorium on all deepwater drilling in the wake of the Deepwater Horizon oil spill, pending a six-month review by a White House appointed panel.

On May 27, the United States Department of the Interior issued a press release which indicated:

Secretary Salazar is ordering a moratorium on drilling of new deepwater wells until the Presidential Commission investigating the BP oil spill has completed its six-month review. In addition, permitted wells currently being drilled in the deepwater (not counting the emergency relief wells being drilled) in the Gulf of Mexico will be required to halt drilling at the first safe stopping point, and then take steps to secure the well.

In response to the order, Hornbeck Offshore Services filed suit in U.S. District Court seeking an injunction to bar the enforcement of the moratorium. The lawsuit has been joined by several companies involved in offshore drilling, and Louisiana governor Bobby Jindal's office signaled its support for the action by filing an amicus brief by the state's attorney general.

Beginning June 8, 2010, Judge Martin Feldman of the U.S. District Court in the Eastern District of Louisiana began ruling on motions in the case. Prior to June 22, Judge Feldman issued several orders to expedite the case (i.e. moving a hearing date from July 28 to June 21 and denying the government's request for a continuance). On June 22, 2010, Feldman granted a preliminary injunction lifting the moratorium.

== Appeal ==
Ken Salazar, U.S. Secretary of the Interior has indicated that the U.S. Department of the Interior will also "issue a new order in the coming days that eliminates any doubt that a moratorium is needed, appropriate, and within our authorities."

The White House appealed to the 5th Circuit Court of Appeals, which granted the request for an expedited hearing. On July 8, 2010, a three judge panel, W. Eugene Davis, Jerry E. Smith and James L. Dennis, denied the government's emergency request to stay the lower court's decision pending appeal. The Obama administration is preparing a revised moratorium. The three-judge panel will hear arguments on the merits of the case the week of August 30.

Despite the ruling of the three-judge panel, a de facto moratorium arguably remained in place because the government had told oil companies that they must seek revised permits and the approval of a government agency to continue deepwater drilling. One of the requirements was that a CEO of a company seeking to drill must personally sign a statement certifying that all safety equipment works properly and all well designs are safe, and acknowledge personal criminal liability for any false statements.

Meanwhile, a coalition of environmental groups moved for Judge Feldman to be disqualified. A hearing with Judge Feldman on that motion was scheduled for July 28, 2010.

== Timeline ==
- April 20 - Deepwater Horizon explosion
- May 27 - Moratorium issued
- June 7- Initial complaint filed in District Court
- June 8 - Feldman issues first order in Hornbeck case
- June 9 - Plaintiffs request injunction to lift moratorium, hearing date set for July 28
- June 11 - Feldman issues order granting Plaintiff's Motion to Expedite and moves hearing date to June 21 , order granting Plaintiff's Motion to "Adopt Grounds for Preliminary Injunction"
- June 14 - Feldman issues order denying US request for continuance until July 28
  Note that the printed text has been crossed out and is not the issued order. The order is handwritten and reads in part: "Denied. The issues presented are of national significance and to delay resolution would be irresponsible. "
- June 21 - Hearing held. Feldman issues multiple orders.
- June 22 - "Opening of Stock Market" - reported sale of Exxon stock according to Feldman Letter
- June 22 - Feldman issues decision lifting moratorium.
- June 23 - Feldman letter to US Courts' Committee on Financial Disclosure C:

This is to advise that the Exxon stock noted [... in] my 2009 Financial Disclosure was sold at the opening of the stock market on June 22, 2010 prior to the opening of a Court hearing on the Oil Spill Moratorium case.

- June 24 - Feldman denies Salazar, et al. a temporary stay pending appeal to the 5th Circuit, grants request for disclosure of his 2009 Financial Disclosure form
- June 25 - U.S. requests a stay from the 5th Circuit
- June 25 - Feldman issues public statement disclosing the earlier sale of Exxon stock on June 22.
