= Eraydın =

Eraydın is a Turkish surname. Notable people with the surname include:

- Başak Eraydın (born 1994), Turkish tennis player
- Yavuz Eraydın (born 1976), Turkish footballer
