= Korkut (name) =

- Gender: Male
- Language: Turkish

Origin
- Meaning: Big hailstone, stern, resolute
- Region of origin: Turkey

Other names
- Related names: Yavuz

Korkut is a masculine Turkish name and surname. In Turkish, "korkut" means "big hailstone", "stern", and/or "resolute". An early example is Dede Korkut, a mythological figure in the Book of Dede Korkut.

Notable persons with that name include:

== Given name ==
- Şehzade Korkut (1467-1513) Ottoman prince
- Korkut Boratav (born 1935), Turkish economist
- Korkut Eken (born 1945), Turkish security officer
- Korkut Özal (1929–2016), Turkish politician
- Korkut Uygun (born 1975), Turkish chemical engineer and a medical researcher
- Korkut Yaltkaya (1938–2001), Turkish academic

== Surname ==
- Derviš Korkut (1888–1969), Bosnian librarian
- Efe Korkut (born 2006), Turkish footballer
- Kübra Öçsoy Korkut (born 1994), Turkish para table tennis player
- Tayfun Korkut (born 1974), Turkish footballer
