= Kaşif ROUV =

Turkish remotely operated underwater vehicle

Kaşif (literally: "Explorer") is a Turkish remotely operated underwater vehicle (ROUV) developed to perform various tasks at underwater drilling works during gas exploration.

The ROUV is constructed in open frame configuration, and can operate in depths up to 3,000 m (9,800 ft). It has seven electric motors for propulsion and a hydraulic power system for driving drawers.

Kaşif was developed and constructed by Armelsan in Turkey in 2020, and was first used at underwater drilling works of Fatih during gas exploration in Black Sea.
