= Black Powder-class support vessel =

United States Navy submarine escort vessels

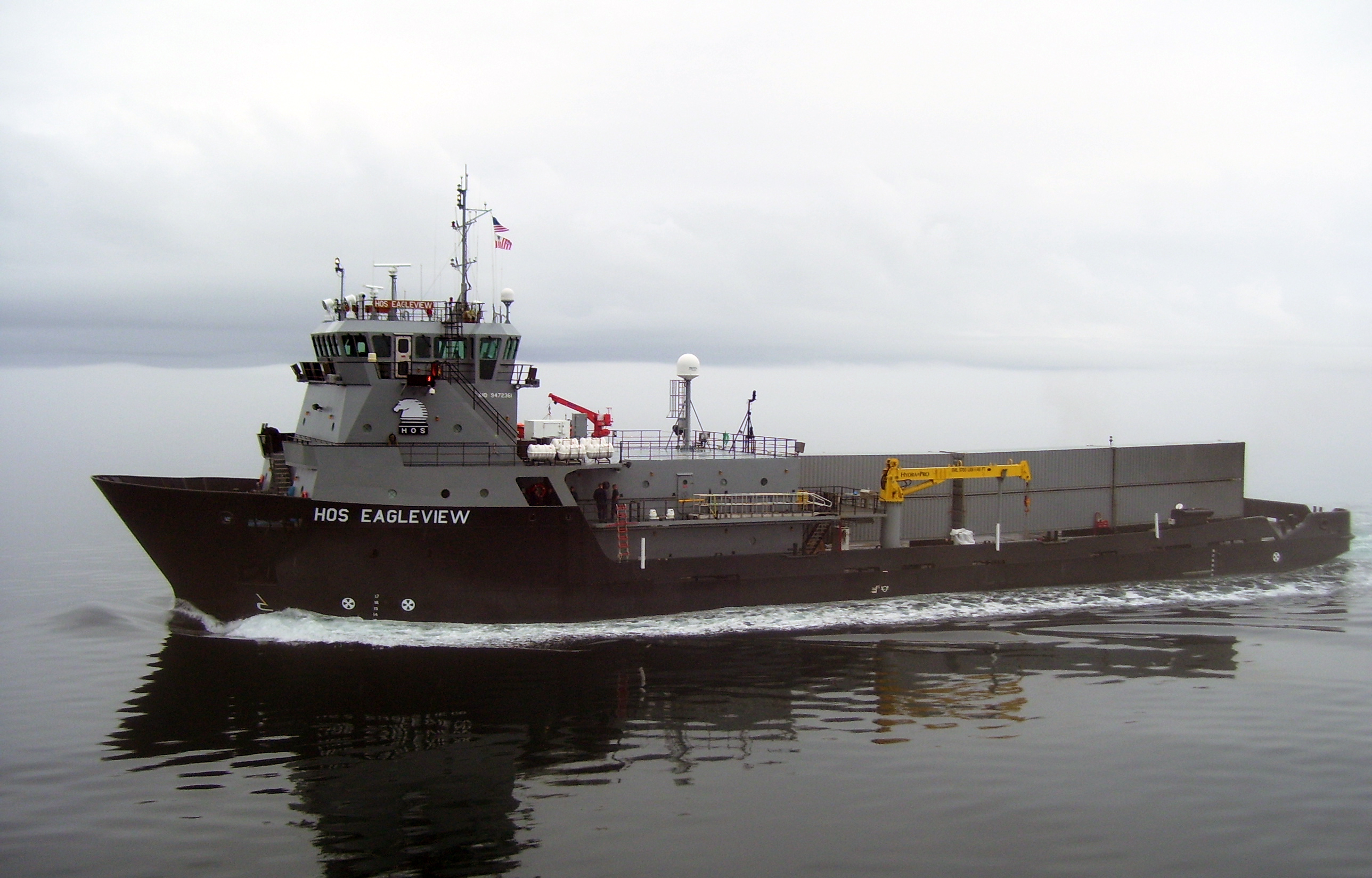
- USNS Eagleview

Class overview
- Name: Black Powder class
- Builders: Leevac Industries
- Operators: United States Navy
- Cost: US$152 million
- Completed: 4
- Active: 4

General characteristics
- Type: Submarine and Special Warfare Support Vessel
- Length: 250 ft (76 m)
- Beam: 54 ft (16 m)
- Draft: 15 ft (4.6 m)
- Propulsion: Diesel
- Speed: 14 knots (26 km/h; 16 mph)
- Armament: 2 × Mk 38 Mod 2 25 mm autocannon; Crew-served Browning M2 machine guns

The Black Powder class is a class of Submarine and Special Warfare Support Vessels under the United States Navy.

== Development ==
All four ships were owned by Hornbeck Offshore Services from 2009 but in 2015, the United States Navy purchased all ships and redesignated them. They are named Black Powder, Westwind, Eagleview and Arrowhead.

== Ships in class ==
Black Powder class
Name	Hull Number	Builder	Launched	Commissioned	Status
Black Powder	T-AGSE-1	Leevac Industries	2009	2015	Active
Westwind	T-AGSE-2	Leevac Industries	2009	2015	Active
Eagleview	T-AGSE-3	Leevac Industries	2009	2015	Active
Arrowhead	T-AGSE-4	Leevac Industries	2009	2015	Active
