= Deepwater well integrity =

Oil rig engineering

Deepwater wellbore integrity can be defined as the application of relevant engineering techniques and operational measures in deepwater drilling to control related risks during the drilling process, ensuring that deepwater oil and gas wells are always in a safe state throughout their entire life cycle.

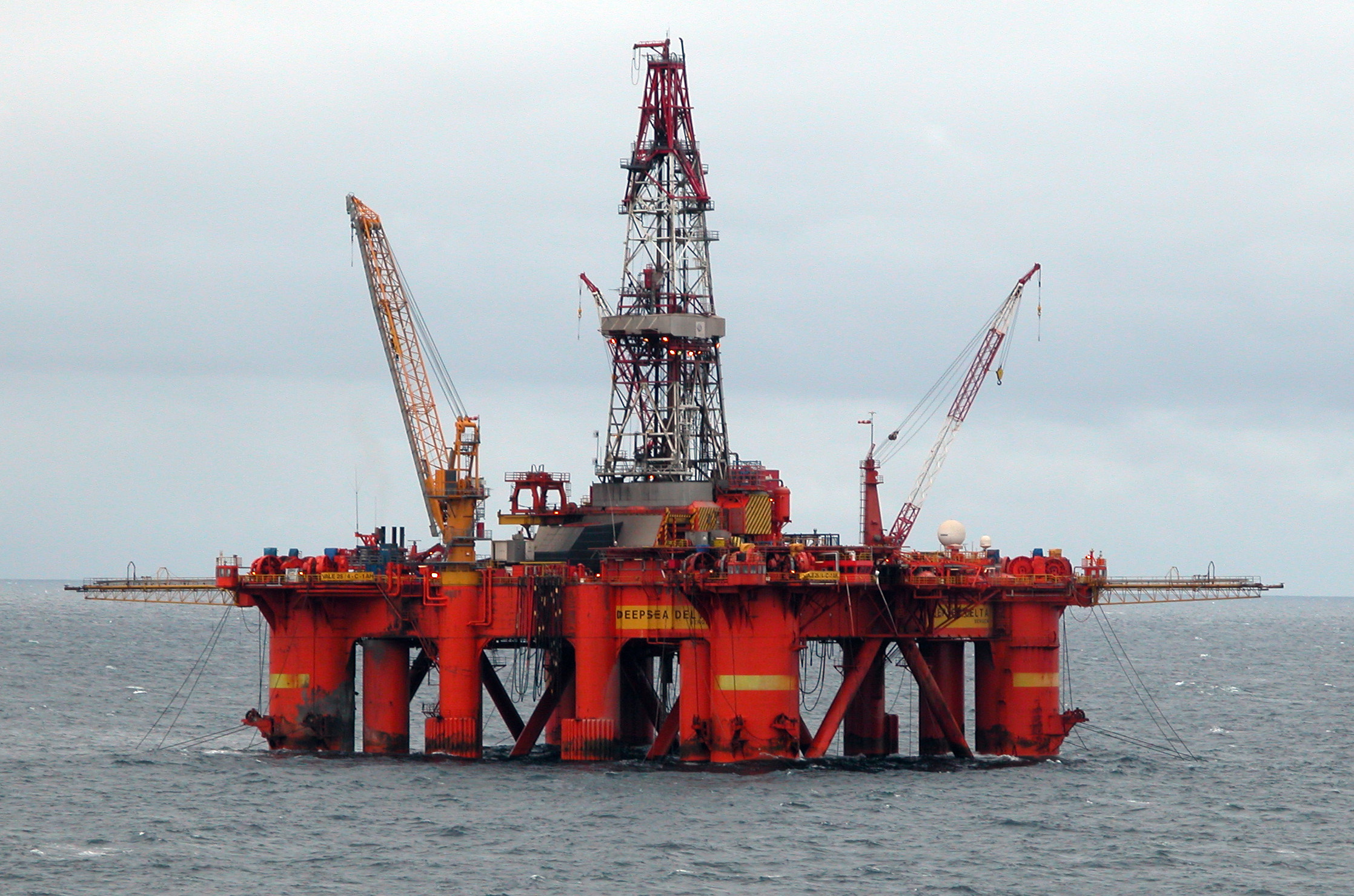
Deepwater drilling platform

In deepwater drilling, high investment, high risk, and high return are the most significant characteristics, so special attention needs to be paid to safety operations during the drilling process.

== Difficulties ==
=== Harsh environment ===
According to international conventions, oil and gas wells with a depth greater than 500 meters are considered deepwater wells, while oil and gas wells with a depth greater than 1500 meters are considered ultra deepwater wells. In the deepwater marine environment, geological conditions and environmental factors are more complex. Firstly, the deepwater marine environment is more harsh, with frequent typhoons and extreme waves. After the superposition of internal wave and ocean currents in the ocean, the deepwater flow velocity increases, resulting in extremely harsh comprehensive environmental conditions for deepwater drilling; In addition, due to the long offshore distance of deepwater drilling, it is difficult to provide material support, which also makes challenges for deepwater drilling.

=== Shallow geological hazards ===
The geological conditions in deepwater areas are complex. For example, in the South China Sea region, shallow areas usually meet with three shallow problems when drilling in deepwater areas, namely shallow gas, shallow water flow, and natural gas hydrates. During drilling operations, complex accidents such as gas invasion and overflow are prone to occur. In addition, deep strata have poor diagenesis, weak pressure bearing capacity, so leakage is easy to happen, the risk of well control is high, and the treatment is difficult, which impact on deepwater wellbore integrity seriously.

=== Complex working environment ===
In the process of deepwater drilling, due to the long-term complex and dynamic changes in the marine geological environment, the relevant marine petroleum machinery and tools are more susceptible to external damage caused by surrounding marine activities. Therefore, in this complex flow field with high spatiotemporal variability, the relevant petroleum equipment and tools will undergo varying degrees of corrosion, damage, and deformation. These damages will accumulate and cause irreversible leakage, perforation, and fracture to themselves, causing serious damage to deepwater wellbore integrity. In addition, due to the difficulty of timely monitoring and evaluation of leaks in deepwater oil and gas wells, traditional detection methods for onshore oil fields are no longer applicable. Therefore, timely detection of leakage points and accurate evaluation are also important difficulties in ensuring the deepwater wellbore integrity.

== Testing ==
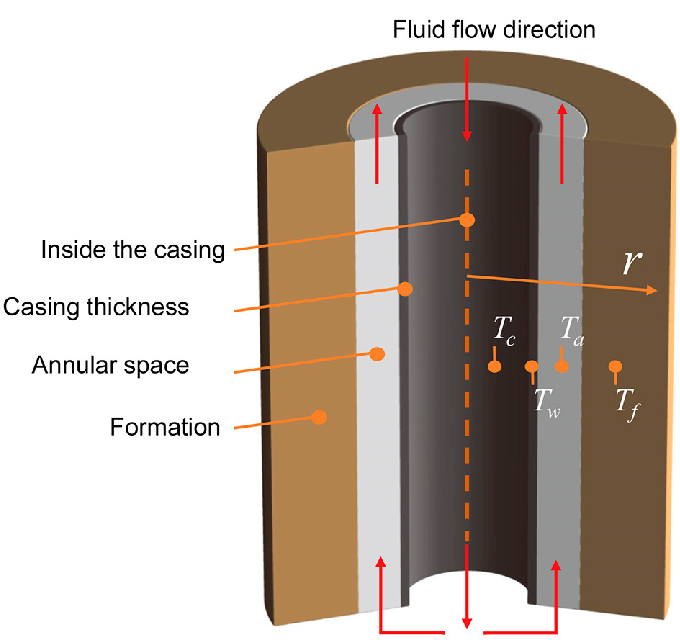
Schematic representation of wellbore and formation temperature fields

The detection of deepwater wellbore integrity can be generally divided into two aspects from global perspective: detection of wellbore pressure and wellbore temperature. By detecting the two important indicators of temperature and pressure, the change in borehole thickness of the casing string, as well as the location of leakage points and types of damage, can be determined. Therefore, a comprehensive assessment of deepwater wellbore integrity can be conducted.

=== Equipment ===
The commonly used detection devices are sound wave acquisition tools and electromagnetic detectors. To meet with the special environmental requirements of deepwater oil and gas wells, it is necessary to strengthen the high temperature and high pressure resistance, corrosion resistance, and airtightness of the acoustic testing instrument, so as to make the detection results more accurate. The electromagnetic detector is used to detect damage to the casing string in the wellbore. Due to the use of low magnetic material oil pipes in deepwater oil and gas wells, the response time of the electromagnetic detector will be shortened, optimizing the detection process. Generally, when used together with acoustic acquisition tools and electromagnetic detectors, the detection and analysis of deepwater wellbore integrity will be more comprehensive.

== Future work ==
The development of artificial intelligence (AI) technology has led to the application of data driven methods, including machine learning and deep learning to engineering problems in deepwater oil and gas wells. AI based system is used to monitor wellbore pressure and temperature in real time, detect abnormal conditions, classify risk levels, and assess deepwater wellbore integrity. Then, corresponding risk control measures and well control measures are provided based on historical and near well data to reduce safety risks. Among them, timely and accurate identification of corresponding early accident risks is of great importance. Therefore, in the future, real-time monitoring of deepwater wellbore integrity, real-time warning of abnormal situations, and making accurate and timely processing methods based on artificial intelligence methods will become the development direction of petroleum engineering, offshore engineering, and computer technology.
