= Petkim =

Turkish petrochemical company

Petkim Petrokimya Holding A.Ş.
- Type: Anonim Şirket
- Traded as: BİST: PETKM
- Industry: Petrochemical
- Founded: 1965; 61 years ago
- Founder: TPAO
- Headquarters: Aliağa, İzmir
- Area served: Worldwide
- Key people: Vagıf Aliyev (Chairman); Anar Mammadov (General Manager)
- Products: Ethylene, thermoplastics, PVC, PP, Masterbatches, benzene, toluene, VCM, aromatics
- Revenue: ▼US$2.69 billion (2023)
- Operating income: ▲US$408 million
- Net income: ▲US$255 million (2023)
- Total assets: ▼US$3.42 billion (2023)
- Total equity: ▲US$1.83 billion (2023)
- Number of employees: 2,586
- Parent: SOCAR (51.0%)
- Website: www.petkim.com.tr

Petkim Petrokimya Holding A.Ş. is the leading petrochemical company of Turkey. Founded on April 3, 1965, by Turkish Petroleum Corporation (TPAO) in 1965 in İzmir and privatized in 2008 and transferred to SOCAR. The main plant complex is located in Yarımca, Izmit. From 1985 on, a second complex has been constructed in Aliağa, İzmir.

Specializing in petrochemical manufacturing, the company produces ethylene, polyethylene, polyvinyl chloride, polypropylene and other chemical building blocks for use in the manufacture of plastics, textiles, and other consumer and industrial products. The company has 14 manufacturing plants, supplying a significant portion of petrochemicals used in Turkey. The company also exports products to the United States, and countries in Europe, the Middle East, Africa, and Asia.

Petkim is listed on the Istanbul Stock Exchange (BIST).

Petlim is a container port currently being built near the town of Aliağa.
