= USNS Westwind =

2008 Black Powder-class support vessel

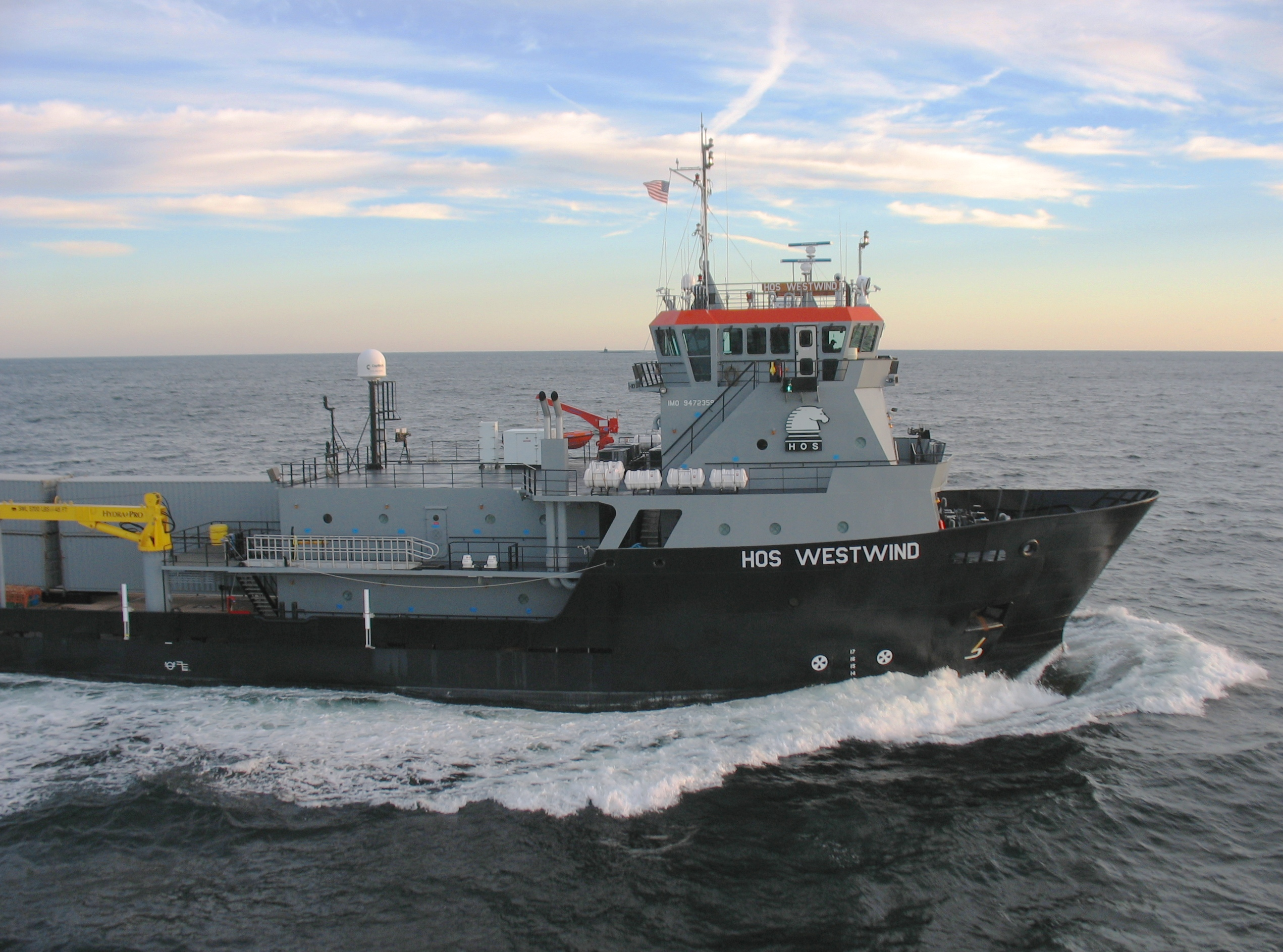

History

United States
- Name: Westwind
- Namesake: Westwind
- Operator: Hornbeck Offshore Services (2009-2015)
- Builder: Leevec Industries, Jennings, Louisiana
- Launched: 2009
- Identification: IMO number: 9472359; MMSI number: 368926303; Callsign: NWES; Pennant number: T-AGSE-2
- Status: Active

General characteristics
- Class & type: Black Powder-class submarine and special warfare support vessel
- Length: 250 ft (76 m)
- Beam: 54 ft (16 m)
- Draft: 15 ft (4.6 m)
- Propulsion: Diesel
- Speed: 14 knots (26 km/h; 16 mph)
- Armament: 2 × Mk 38 Mod 2 25 mm autocannon; Crew-served Browning M2 machine guns

USNS Westwind (T-AGSE-2) is a Black Powder-class submarine and special warfare support vessel acquired by the U.S. Navy in 2015 and assigned to the US Coast Guard's MFPU (Marine Force Protection Unit) at Naval Submarine Base Kings Bay. Although she is a Black Powder class ship, she was built to mirror the Black Powder. She has been modified multiple times since the Navy purchased her in 2015. Her most recent upgrades have brought in a new gun system, updated crew quarters, and a remodeled bridge.

== Construction ==
Westwind was built in 2009 by Leevec Industries, Jennings, Louisiana, for Hornbeck Offshore Services.

== See also ==
- List of Military Sealift Command ships
