= Dana Douglas =

American judge (born 1975)

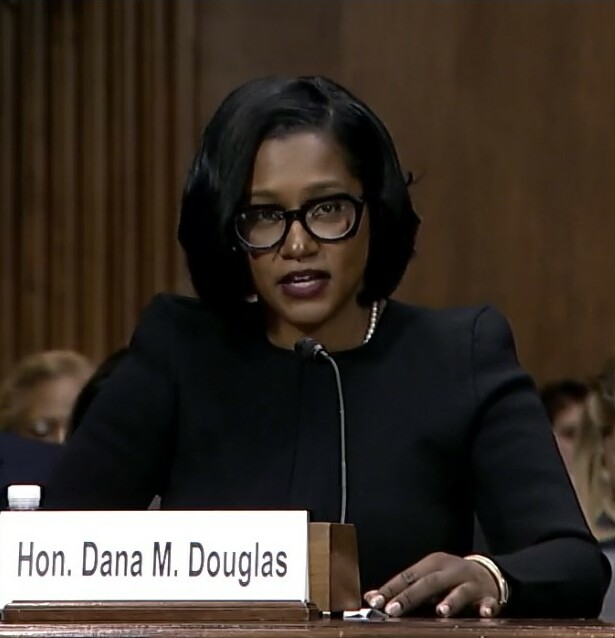

Judge of the United States Court of Appeals for the Fifth Circuit
- Incumbent
- Assumed office December 16, 2022
- Appointed by: Joe Biden
- Preceded by: James L. Dennis

Personal details
- Born: Dana Marie Douglas; 1975 (age 50–51) New Orleans, Louisiana, U.S.
- Education: Miami University (BA); Loyola University New Orleans (JD)

Dana Marie Douglas (born 1975) is an American attorney who is a United States circuit judge of the United States Court of Appeals for the Fifth Circuit. She previously served as a United States magistrate judge of the United States District Court for the Eastern District of Louisiana from 2019 to 2022.

== Education ==
Douglas graduated from St. Mary's Academy in New Orleans. She earned a Bachelor of Arts from Miami University in 1997 and a Juris Doctor from the Loyola University New Orleans College of Law in 2000.

== Career ==
From 2000 to 2001, Douglas served as a law clerk for Judge Ivan L. R. Lemelle of the United States District Court for the Eastern District of Louisiana. From 2003 to 2013, she was a member of the New Orleans Civil Service Commission. In this role, Douglas authored an opinion affirming the suspension and termination of a police officer for committing a battery against a civilian. In another case, Douglas affirmed disciplinary actions against officers who formed a limited liability company to administer their paid off-duty police details.

She was also a partner for 17 years at the New Orleans office of Liskow & Lewis, a Louisiana law firm focused on energy and oil industries.

Douglas is a former president of both the New Orleans Bar Association and the Greater New Orleans Louis A. Martinet Society. Douglas volunteered in legal clinics and was involved in several local and state legal groups.

== Federal judicial service ==
Douglas joined the United States District Court for the Eastern District of Louisiana as a United States magistrate judge on January 6, 2019.

On June 15, 2022, President Joe Biden nominated Douglas to serve as United States circuit judge for the United States Court of Appeals for the Fifth Circuit. President Biden nominated Douglas to the seat vacated by Judge James L. Dennis, who announced his intent to assume senior status upon confirmation of a successor. On July 27, 2022, a hearing on her nomination was held before the Senate Judiciary Committee. On September 15, 2022, her nomination was favorably reported by the committee by a 16–6 vote. On November 30, 2022, Majority Leader Chuck Schumer filed cloture on her nomination. On December 8, 2022, the United States Senate invoked cloture on her nomination by a 63–31 vote. On December 13, 2022, her nomination was confirmed by a 65–31 vote. She received her judicial commission on December 16, 2022. She is the first black woman to serve on the Fifth Circuit.

=== Notable cases ===
In a 2–1 decision joined by Senior Judge Carolyn Dineen King, Douglas wrote for the majority that Texas must remove the "floating barrier" installed in the Rio Grande in United States vs. Abbott (2023). The barrier was initially built in June 2023, under the direction of Texas Governor Greg Abbott as part of Operation Lone Star, with the goal of countering illegal immigration. The 5th Circuit subsequently reversed Douglas' decision en banc by a 11–7 vote, with Douglas authoring a 25–page dissent.

== See also ==
- List of African American federal judges
- List of African American jurists

Legal offices
Preceded by James L. Dennis	Judge of the United States Court of Appeals for the Fifth Circuit; 2022–present	Incumbent
