= RV Barbaros Hayreddin Paşa =

Turkish seismographic research/survey vessel

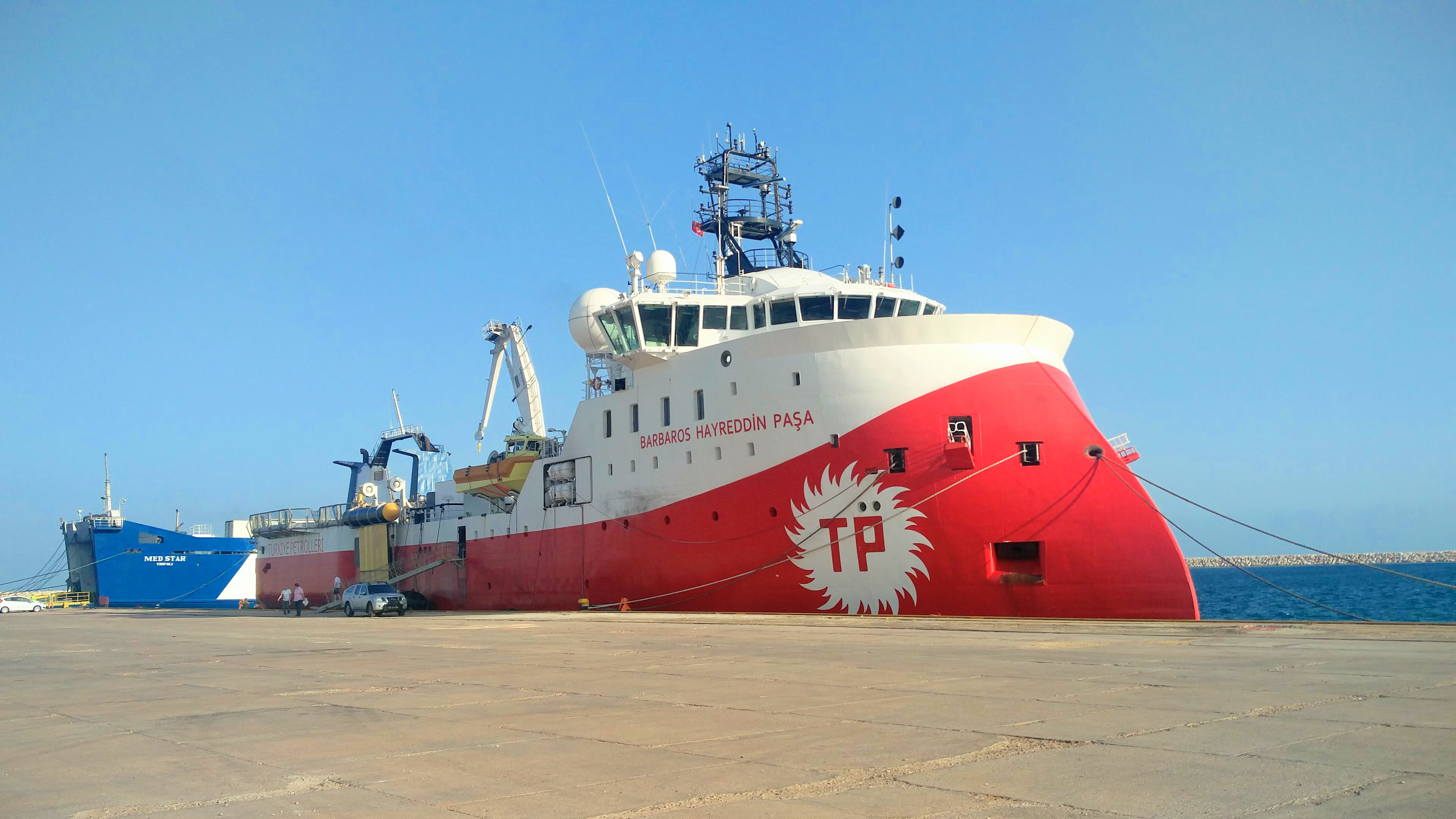
- RV Barbaros Hayreddin Paşa docked in Taşucu, Mersin Province

History

Turkey
- Name: Barbaros Hayreddin Paşa; ex Polarcus Samur (2011)
- Owner: Turkish Petroleum Corporation (TPAO)
- Operator: Turkish Petroleum Corporation (TPAO)
- Builder: Drydocks World Dubai, UAE
- Launched: 16 February 2011
- Completed: 2 March 2011
- Homeport: Istanbul
- Identification: IMO number: 9538103; MMSI number: 311012700; Callsign: C6XK8
- Status: In active service as survey ship

General characteristics
- Class & type: Seismographic research ship
- Tonnage: 4,711 GT; 1,414 NT
- Length: 84.20 m (276 ft 3 in)
- Beam: 17 m (55 ft 9 in)
- Draft: 6.70 m (22 ft 0 in) (max.)
- Installed power: 4 x 3,060 kW (4,100 hp)
- Propulsion: 4 x Wärtsilä 9L26 Diesel-electric engine
- Speed: 17 knots (31 km/h; 20 mph) (service)
- Armament: None
- Aircraft carried: Sikorsky S-92
- Aviation facilities: 1x helideck

RV Barbaros Hayreddin Paşa is a Turkish seismographic research/survey vessel owned and operated by the Turkish Petroleum Corp. (TPAO). Built in Dubai, United Arab Emirates (UAE) and launched in 2011, she was purchased in 2013 and renamed in honor of the renowned Ottoman Navy admiral Barbarossa Hayreddin Pasha (1478–1546).

== History ==
The ship was built at Drydocks World Dubai for Polarcus, a Dubai-based marine geophysical company in the UAE. She was launched on 16 February 2011 joining the company's same class fleet as the fourth vessel, and was christened Polarcus Samur for Arabic female given name meaning "swift, fleet". She was delivered on 2 March 2011, commissioned under the flag of the Bahamas and sailed to its first mission to serve for Namibia in charter.

The ship was acquired in December 2012 by the Turkish state-owned oil and gas company TPAO to an amount of US$130 million for use in marine seismographic surveys, Minister of Energy and Natural Resources Taner Yıldız said on 30 January 2013. The sale includes a collaboration arrangement with Polarcus company for support service in seismic data acquisition, fast-track data processing, management and crewing for the vessel over a three-year period. After repainted in red and white at Desan Shipyard in Tuzla, Istanbul, reflagged and renamed to Barbaros Hayreddin Paşa, she was commissioned on 23 February 2013 by Prime Minister Recep Tayyip Erdoğan. In the beginning, she will operate in a region around 60–70 km (37–43 mi) far from Bosporus in western Black Sea. Later, she will continue with surveys in the Mediterranean Sea for oil and gas field exploration.

== Characteristics ==
She is an Arctic-ready with an ICE-1A class notation and environment-friendly high-tech vessel, built using Norwegian Ulstein SX133 X-bow innovative vessel design, which reduces fuel consumption and enables improved transit speeds at minimum emissions. The vessel also consists of most technologically advanced seismic and navigation systems available.

Barbaros Hayreddin Paşa is able to deploy up to eight streamers each of 6,000 m (20,000 ft) length, or six streamers each of 8,000 m (26,000 ft) length, with lateral streamer separations of between 25–200 m (82–656 ft), and can tow both conventional and wide tow spreads. She obtains 2D and 3D data. The ship has also a helideck for use with a Sikorsky S-92 helicopter on board.

The vessel is 84.20 m (276 ft 3 in) long, with a beam of 17 m (55 ft 9 in) and a max. draft of 6.70 m (22 ft 0 in). Assessed at 4,711 GT and 1,414 NT, the ship is propelled by four Wärtsilä 9L26 Diesel-electric engines having 3,060 kW (4,100 hp) power. She has a max. speed of 17 knots (31 km/h; 20 mph) in service.

== Ship's register ==
- 2011 ex Polarcus Samur, built for Polarcus DMCC,
- 2013 Barbaros Hayreddin Paşa, purchased by the Turkish Petroleum Corp. (TPAO).

== Sister ship ==
- RV Vyacheslav Tikhonov, ex RV Polarcus Selma

== See also ==
- List of research vessels of Turkey
