= Yavuz (drillship) =

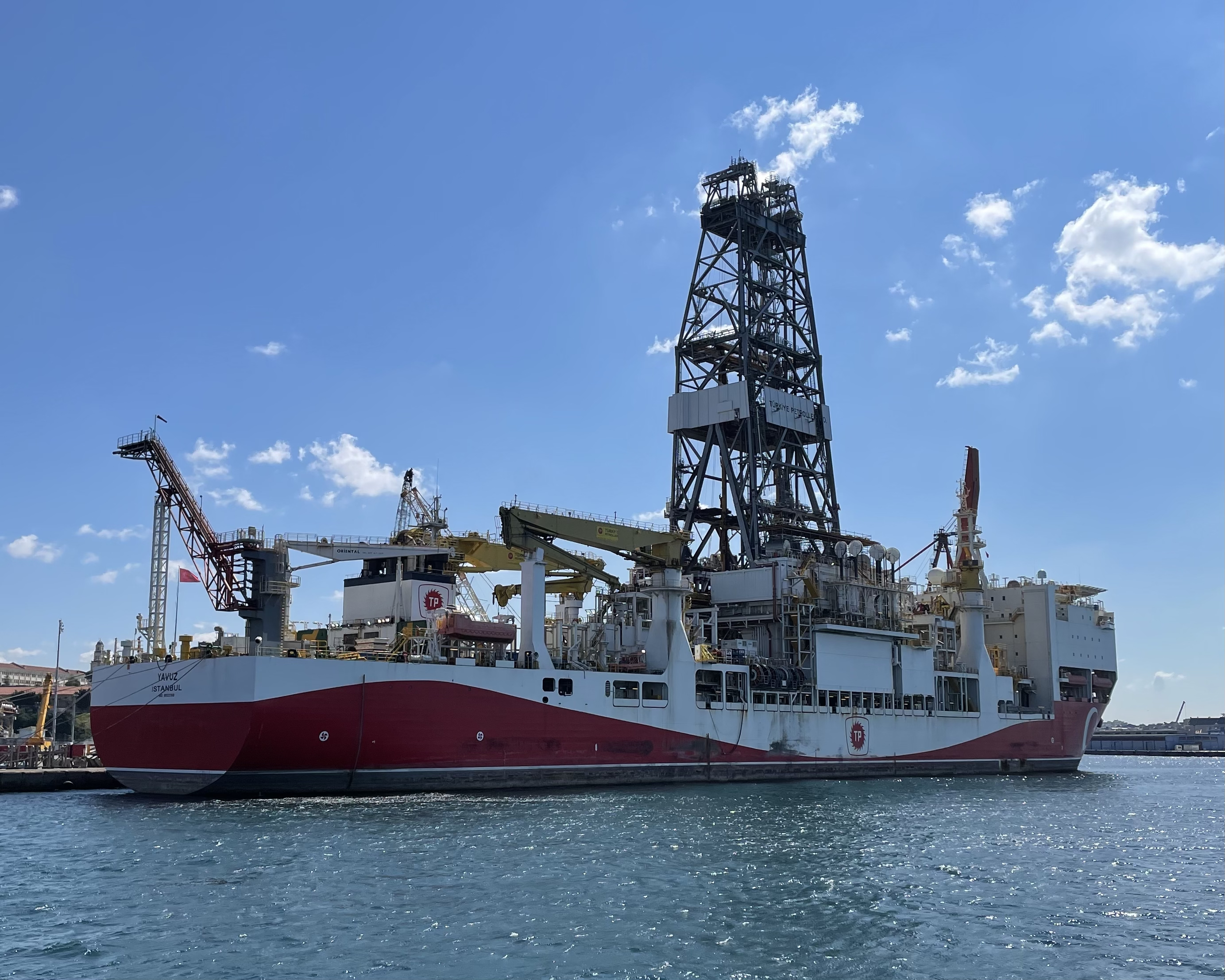

History

Turkey
- Name: Yavuz; Deepsea Metro I (2011–2019)
- Namesake: Selim I, known as yavuz, "the resolute"
- Owner: Türkiye Petrolleri A. O. (TPAO); Golden Close Maritime Corp.
- Operator: Türkiye Petrolleri A. O. (TPAO); Odfjell Drilling (2011–2018)
- Builder: Ulsan Shipyard, Hyundai Heavy Industries, Ulsan, South Korea
- Launched: July 2011
- Identification: IMO number: 9503768; MMSI Number 538008234; Call sign: V7A2115
- Status: In active service

General characteristics
- Tonnage: 51,283 GT; 38,000 DWT
- Length: 229.19 m (751.9 ft)
- Beam: 36 m (118 ft)
- Draft: 14.7 m (48 ft)
- Speed: 8.6 kn (15.9 km/h; 9.9 mph) (max.); 4.5 kn (8.3 km/h; 5.2 mph) (service)
- Armament: None

Yavuz, ex Deepsea Metro I, is a Turkey-flagged ultra deepwater drillship owned and operated by the state-owned Turkish Petroleum Corporation (TPAO). She is Turkey's second drillship.

== Name ==
Yavuz means "Resolute" in Turkish.

The three drillships of the state-owned Turkish gas company, Fatih, Yavuz and Kanuni, are named after the most famous conquerors and rulers of the Ottoman Empire: Mehmed II, Turkish: Fatih Sultan Mehmet, Mehmed the Conqueror, who conquered Constantinople in 1453; Selim I (r. 1512-1520), known as Selim the Resolute, Turkish: Yavuz Sultan Selim, who hugely expanded his empire; and Suleiman the Magnificent (r. 1520-1566), known in Turkish as Kanunî Sultan Süleyman ("the Lawgiver"), under whom the empire reached its apex.

== History ==
The ship was designed by SBM Offshore subsidiary GustoMSC and built by the Hyundai Heavy Industries, Ulsan at Ulsan Shipyard in South Korea in July 2011, and christened Deepsea Metro I.

Flagged Bermuda (2011-2018) and the Marshall Islands (2018-2019), the drillship was owned by Golden Close Maritime Corp., and operated by Odfjell Drilling. She served off Tanzania (2012-2014) and Kenya (2014) until the end of 2014, off Vietnam (2015-2017) and Philippines (2017). In May 2017, it became idle and was warm stacked in Malaysia waiting for a new contract.

The ship was purchased in October 2018 by the state-owned company Türkiye Petrolleri Anonim Ortaklığı (TPAO) at a price of US$262.5 million. She sailed off Port of Algeciras in Spain, and arrived in the Marmara Sea on 22 February 2019. It was reported that the ship was named Yavuz, and will start drilling operations in the Mediterranean Sea, right after the completion of maintenance and renovation works off Yalova. It is the second of three drillships purchased by Turkey, after Fatih, ex Deepsea Metro II, and before Kanuni.

== Characteristics ==
The deepwater drillship is 229.19 m (751.9 ft) long and has a beam of 36 m (118 ft) and a draft of 14.7 m (48 ft). Assessed at 51,283 GT and 38,000 DWT, she has a max. speed of 8.6 kn (15.9 km/h; 9.9 mph) and 4.5 kn (8.3 km/h; 5.2 mph) in service. The vessel is able to carry out drilling at a sea depth up to 10,000 ft (3,000 m).

== Ship registry ==
- ex Deepsea Metro I Bahama-flagged (July 2011 - October 2018)
- ex Deepsea Metro I Marshall Islands-flagged (December 2018 - March 2019)

== See also ==
- Fatih (ex Deepsea Metro II), sister ship and Turkey's first drillship (2017)
- Kanuni (ex 'Sertao), Turkey's third drillship (2020)
- Abdülhamid Han (ex Cobalt Explorer), Turkey's fourth drillship (2021)
