= Fossil fuel drilling =

Fossil fuel drilling may refer to:

- Oil well
- Offshore drilling
- Deepwater drilling
- Drilling fluid
