= Geoservices =

Upstream oilfield services subsidiary of Schlumberger Limited

- Company type: Subsidiary of Schlumberger Limited
- Industry: Oilfield services
- Founded: 1958; 68 years ago
- Founder: Gaston Rebilly
- Headquarters: Roissy-en-France, France
- Number of employees: Approx. 5,000 (2010)

Geoservices was a French upstream oilfield services which was acquired by Schlumberger Limited. The company specialized in mud logging and slickline production. The company had office in Roissy, France and Magdeburg, Germany and operations in 52 countries and has been integrated into Schlumberger.

== History ==
The company was founded by Gaston Rebilly in 1958 and based in Paris, France. Geoservices had approximately 5000 employees in 52 countries when it was acquired by Schlumberger Limited for $1.07 billion dollars in March 2010 from Gaston Rebilly and his family.

== See also ==
- List of oilfield service companies
