= Korkut Uygun =

Turkish scientist (born 1975)

- Born: Jan, 1975; Bonn, Germany
- Education: Boğaziçi University, Wayne State University
- Awards: NIH Pathway to Independence Award, 2008; Massachusetts General Hospital Junior Faculty Award, 2009
- Scientific career
- Fields: Transplantation, Systems Biology, Biomedical Engineering
- Workplaces: Harvard Medical School, Massachusetts General Hospital
- Doctoral advisor: Yinlun Huang

Korkut Uygun is a Turkish chemical engineer and a medical researcher.

== Career ==
Uygun received his BSc and MSc from Boğaziçi University in Istanbul, Turkey, with Dr. Ugur Akman as his advisor on both his MSc and BSc theses. He received Ph.D. in chemical engineering from Wayne State University in 2004. After working for 2 years as a post-doctoral researcher in the research laboratory of the department where he received his Ph.D., in 2006 he became a postdoctoral research associate in the lab of Maish Yarmush at the "Center for Engineering in Medicine" of the Massachusetts General Hospital, where he became the leader of the Organ Engineering Group. In 2008, he was promoted to instructor in surgery (Bioengineering) at Harvard Medical School. In 2011 he was promoted to Assistant Professor in Surgery at Harvard Medical School, before being promoted to Associate Professor a few years later.

== Work ==
A major research objective of Uygun is to enhance utilization of discarded donor organs in order to either increase the supply of transplantable organs, utilize untransplantable organs as cell sources for cell transplantation or bioartificial organ substitutes, such as bioartificial livers, and if the organ proves completely unresuscitatable, utilize them as biocompatible scaffolds for tissue engineering. In 2010, a team led by Uygun in the Center for Engineering in Medicine at Massachusetts General Hospital developed a technique that someday may allow growth of transplantable replacement livers. Uygun's technique developed functional, transplantable rat liver grafts. The study was published in Nature Medicine. Uygun highlighted the significance of his work by saying, "As far as we know, a transplantable liver graft has never been constructed in a laboratory setting before". A novel technique was also used to "reintroduce hepatocytes, the cells that carry out most of the liver’’s primary functions, into the decellularized matrix". The study was reported as "the first steps in growing working livers". It is also the basis of a patent application.

== Research Awards ==
In 2008, Uygun was awarded a Career Award by NIDDK at NIH "Computer-Aided Development of a Liver Organ Culture System".

In 2009, Uygun was awarded by the National Science Foundation for a research project, "Liver Reengineering". which has funded the studies for whole organ decellularization and recellularization.

Uygun is also a Co-investigator and collaborator on several projects with Martin Yarmush and Mehmet Toner

== Personal life ==
Uygun is married to Başak E. Saygılı, who is also a medical researcher and faculty at Harvard Medical School and Center for Engineering in Medicine; the couple has a daughter called Elif Naz.
