= Sibah =

Bolivian singer and songwriter

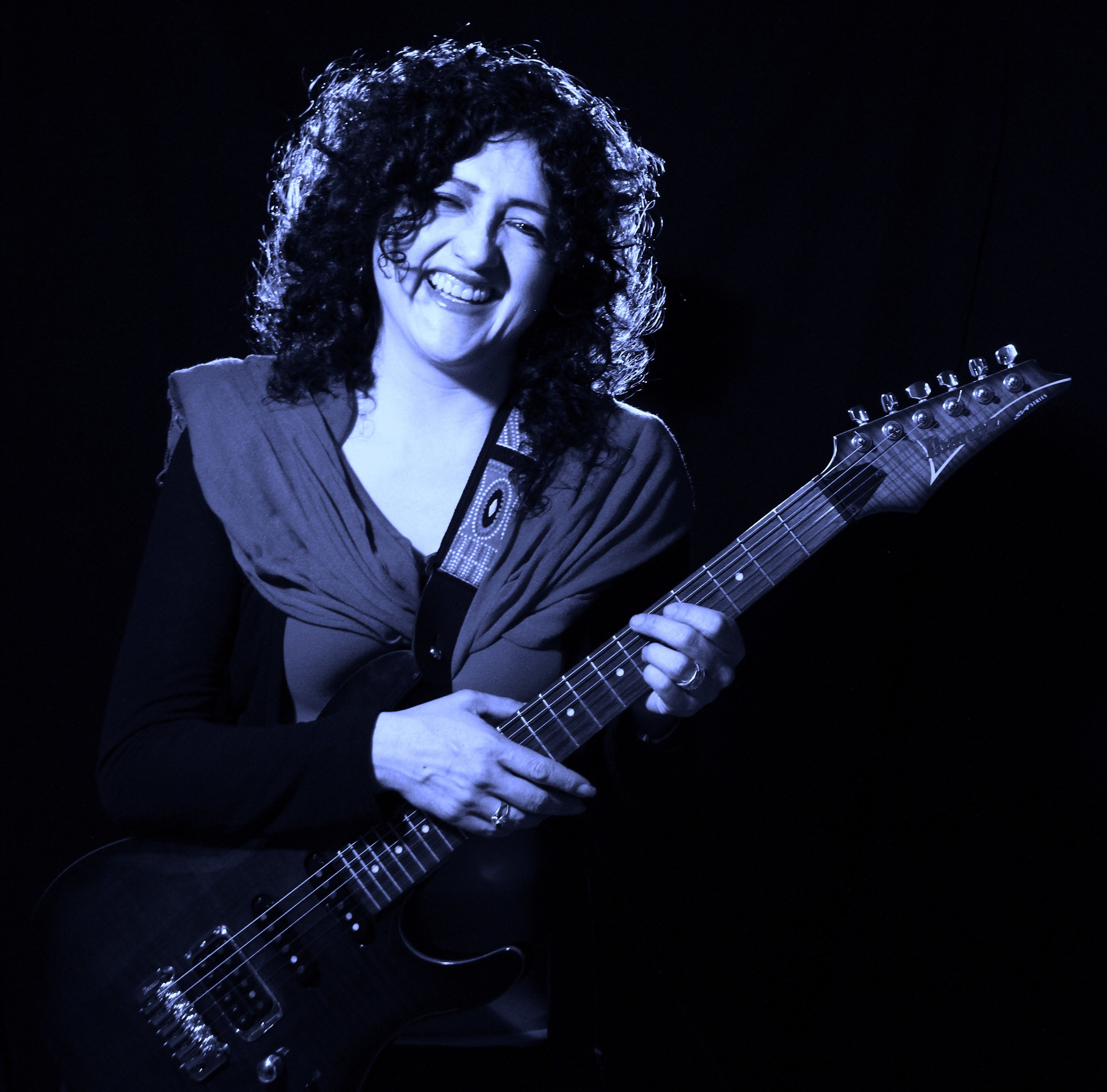
- Born: Silvia Velarde Pereyra; 25 September 1970 (age 54); La Paz, Bolivia
- Occupation: Singer-songwriter

Silvia Velarde Pereyra (born 25 September 1970), better known by her stage name, Sibah, is a Bolivian blues and rock and roll singer-songwriter.

== Early life ==
Sibah, whose artistic career began in 1994, is a soloist and also sings with the a cappella quintet Vozabierta. She studied business administration, has a diploma in political philosophy, and has worked in development cooperation.

== Career ==
Sibah has three CDs and one EP of her own, and two with Vozabierta. The quintet was created in 2006, and its other members are Mercedes Campos Villanueva, María Teresa Dal Pero, Julia Peredo Guzmán, and Mariana Requena Oroza.

Sibah is also part of the Bolivian women's group "Intervención poética a la música" (Poetic Intervention to Music), which seeks to promote dialogue between poetry and music, and the "Nosotras Somos" (We Are) movement, which proposes an exchange and reappropriation of women's compositions. In 2016, she participated in a recital sponsored by UN Women for the HeForShe campaign. She has also performed at Festijazz in La Paz.

She leads workshops on vocal technique, and is Bolivia's representative for the method developed in Mexico by voice researcher John Loza M., who was her voice teacher.

Sibah has presented concerts around her country and also abroad.

== Work ==
Sibah began her career interpreting diverse genres, ranging from rock and blues to cueca. Her solo albums are:

- Con un poquito, 2005
- In.Tenso, 2013
- DesIgual, 2015
- Ami nome, 2019

== Awards and distinctions ==
- Third prize for the AIDS Prevention Campaign, 1998
- Representative of Bolivia chosen by the Mercosur Cultural Network, with the song "Al Amanecer", 2010
- Eduardo Abaroa Plurinational Award for Best Composition in Rock Music, 2012
