= USNS Arrowhead =

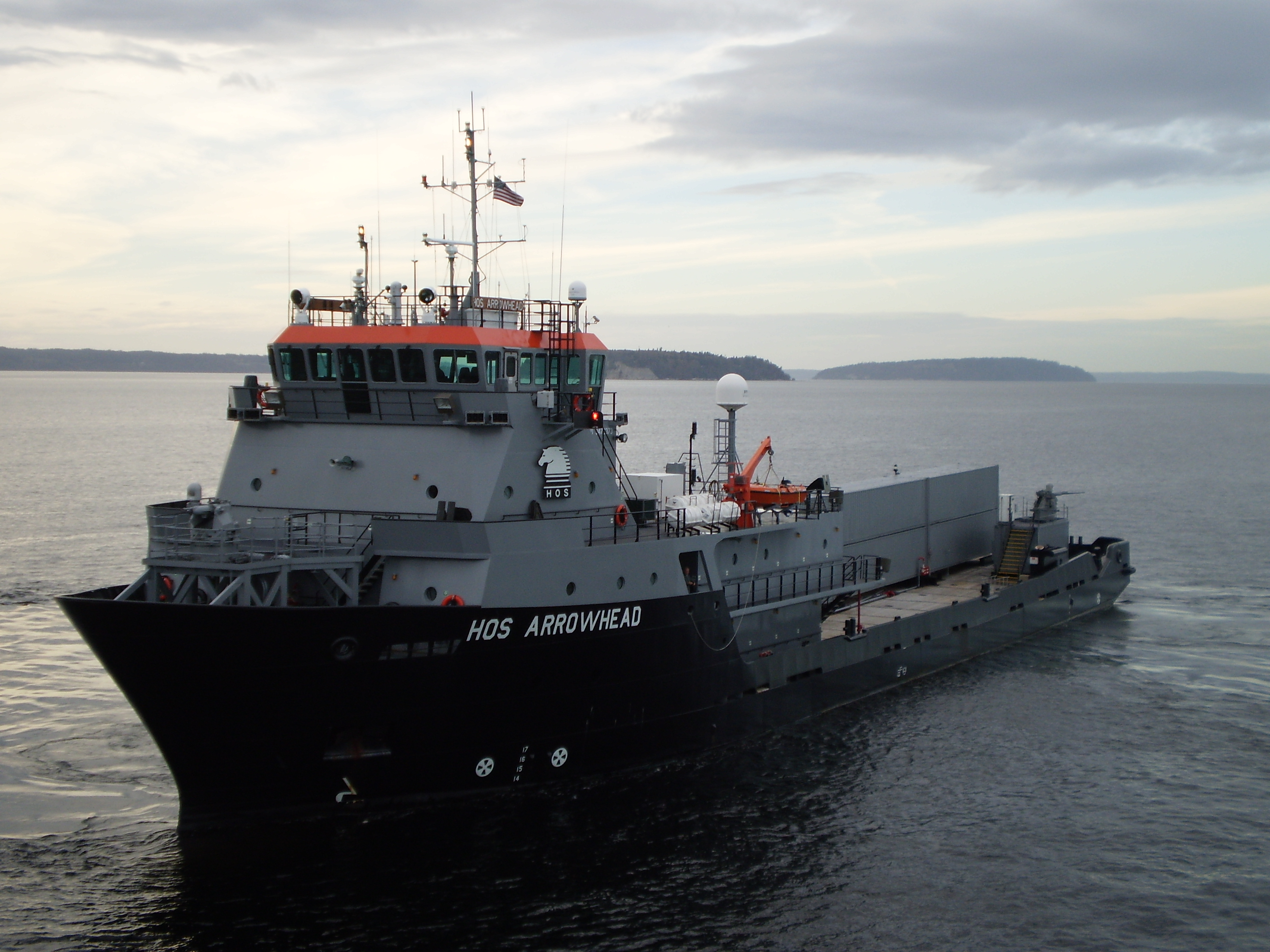

History

United States
- Name: USNS Arrowhead
- Operator: Military Sealift Command
- Builder: Leevec Industries, Jennings, Louisiana
- Launched: 2009
- Identification: IMO number: 9472373; MMSI number: 338092000; Callsign: NARR
- Status: Active

General characteristics
- Class & type: Submarine and Special Warfare Support Vessels
- Length: 250 ft (76 m)
- Beam: 54 ft (16 m)
- Draft: 15 ft (4.6 m)
- Propulsion: Diesel
- Speed: 14 knots (26 km/h; 16 mph)
- Armament: 2 × Mk 38 Mod 2 25 mm autocannon; Crew-served Browning M2 machine guns

USNS Arrowhead (T-AGSE-4) is a submarine support vessel acquired by the U.S. Navy in 2015 and assigned to Military Sealift Command.

== Construction ==
Arrowhead was built in 2009 by Leevec Industries, Jennings, Louisiana, for Hornbeck Offshore.

== See also ==
- List of Military Sealift Command ships
