= Yavuz Eraydın =

Turkish footballer

Personal information
- Full name: Yavuz Eraydın
- Date of birth: 12 April 1976 (age 50)
- Place of birth: Trabzon, Turkey
- Position: Goalkeeper

Team information
- Current team: TKİ Tavşanlı Linyitspor
- Number: 16

Senior career*
Years	Team	Apps	(Gls)
1995–1996	Trabzon Telekomspor		
1996–1997	Edirnespor		
1997–2001	Adanaspor		
2001–2002	İstanbul Büyükşehir Belediyespor		
2002–2003	Etimesgut Şekerspor		
2003–2005	Sivasspor		
2005–2009	Bursaspor		
2009–2010	Çaykur Rizespor	16	(0)
2010–	Kayseri Erciyesspor	32	(0)
- * Club domestic league appearances and goals

Yavuz Eraydın (born 12 April 1976 in Trabzon, Turkey) is a retired Turkish football goalkeeper. Over the course of his career, he played for numerous clubs including Adanaspor, Sivasspor, Bursaspor, and Çaykur Rizespor. His final professional stint was with Sakaryaspor, where he concluded his playing career in 2016. He who currently plays for TKİ Tavşanlı Linyitspor in the TFF First League.
