= Siba subdistrict =

Siba Subdistrict ناحية السيبة
- Location within Iraq
- Coordinates: 30°17′54″N 48°16′21″E
- Country: Iraq
- Governorate: Basra Governorate
- district: Abu Al-Khaseeb

Siba Subdistrict (Arabic: السيبة) is a subdistrict located in Iraqi Basra Governorate, at the West bank of Shatt al-Arab Its seat is the town of Siba. Total population is 160 000 inhabitants, all Shias Arabs.They work in agriculture, fishing and small business.

Siba was established in 1921 as a District but was downgraded to a Subdistrict in 1933. It was a prosperous area with 65 000 inhabitants (according to the 1977 census) and 27 elementary and secondary schools, the oldest being Siba elementary school which was built 1930. In 1980, with the eruption of Iran–Iraq War, Siba and its surroundings were destroyed completely and the population was displaced due to its location at the front line. After the end of the war in 1988, the population began to return and rebuild their homes and farms. Siba return to its importance due to its rich in natural sources (Siba gas field), abundant water and fertile alluvial soil, in addition to its strategic location on the Iraqi-Iranian border.

== Siba town ==
Siba town is the Seat of Siba subdistrict, situated 65 kilometres (40 mi) south of Basra city on the west bank of Shatt al-Arab, facing Abadan city on the east bank.

== Siba gas field ==
The Siba gas field is located in north Siba subdistrict, explored 1968 .The field is roughly 21 km long and 6–13 km wide; its reserves are 1.1 trillion cubic feet.

In the third round of licensing in 2010, the Siba gas field was awarded to a consortium of Kuwait Energy (45% interest), Turkish Petroleum Corporation (TAPO) (30%) and Iraqi state-owned South Oil Company (25%). Kuwait energy and Turkish Petroleum Corporation (TAPO) will invest $1 Billion to reach plateau of 100 million cubic feet per day in return of $7.50 per barrel of oil equivalent.

On 25 April 2018, Kuwait Energy announced the start of gas production at Siba.

== Environmental issues ==
Siba subdistrict, like other Iraqi and Iranian areas on the Shatt al-Arab, have serious environmental issues; in particular, salt tides due to a shortage of water in rivers Tigris, Euphrates, and Karun. There is also air and water pollution caused by the Abadan Refinery. These two problems have serious impacts on agriculture and people's health.
