= 2010 United States deepwater drilling moratorium =

On May 30, 2010 a 6-month moratorium on all deepwater offshore drilling on the Outer Continental Shelf was declared by U.S. Secretary of the Interior Ken Salazar. The limitation was in response to the Deepwater Horizon oil spill which occurred in the Gulf of Mexico.

== Background ==
As a response to the disaster, on 30 April President Barack Obama ordered the federal government to hold the issuing of new offshore drilling leases until a review determined whether more safety systems were needed and authorized teams to investigate 29 oil rigs in the Gulf in an effort to determine the cause of the disaster.

On May 27 the United States Department of the Interior issued a press release stating that Salazar would issue a 6-month offshore drilling (below 500 feet (150 m) of water) moratorium in the area. Secretary of the Interior Ken Salazar ordered immediate inspections of all deep-water operations in the Gulf of Mexico. An Outer Continental Shelf safety review board within the Department of the Interior is to provide recommendations for conducting drilling activities in the Gulf. In a May 30 announcement of the limitation Salazar said:

The six month moratorium on deepwater drilling will provide time to implement new safety requirements and to allow the Presidential Commission to complete its work... Deepwater production from the Gulf of Mexico will continue subject to close oversight and safety requirements, but deepwater drilling operations must safely come to a halt. With the BP oil spill still growing in the Gulf, and investigations and reviews still underway, a six month pause in drilling is needed, appropriate, and prudent.

Several drilling and oil services companies challenged it. The moratorium was to impact 33 deepwater drilling sites, less than 1% of the 3,600 oil and natural gas production platforms in the Gulf of Mexico. Local officials in Louisiana expressed concern that the moratorium imposed in response to the spill would further harm the economies of coastal communities as the oil industry employs about 58,000 Louisiana residents and has created another 260,000 oil-related jobs, accounting for about 17% of all Louisiana jobs.

== Litigation ==
Soon after, Hornbeck Offshore Services, a company with financial interests in deepwater drilling, filed suit in the Eastern District of Louisiana District Court seeking an injunction to ban enforcement. Judge Martin Feldman issued a decision for Hornbeck on Tuesday, June 22, 2010, granting a preliminary injunction, barring enforcement of the order.

The White House appealed the injunction. On July 8 the Court of Appeals for the Fifth Circuit, based in New Orleans, ruled against a stay of injunction, saying the administration failed to show how it would be irreparably harmed if the stay was not granted. The court also said that the administration "made no showing that there is any likelihood that drilling activities will be resumed pending appeal."

Salazar has indicated that the Department of the Interior will "issue a new order in the coming days that eliminates any doubt that a moratorium is needed, appropriate, and within our authorities."

== Further steps ==
The Obama administration assembled a panel to advise it on how to address offshore drilling in the wake of the spill. The group has stated that Salazar's May 27 report to Obama portrayed their approval of the moratorium; they claim that the panel reviewed a previous draft of the document with bans only on new drilling in water deeper than 1,000 feet.

On 30 June, Salazar said that "he is working very hard to finalize a new offshore drilling moratorium". Michael Bromwich, the head of the newly created Bureau of Ocean Energy Management, Regulation and Enforcement, said that a record of "bad performance, deadly performance" by an oil company should be considered "a relevant factor" for the government when it decides if that company should be awarded future drilling leases. Representative George Miller plans to introduce into the energy reform bill under consideration in the United States House of Representatives that a company's safety record should factor into leasing decisions. By this amendment he wants to ban BP from leasing any additional offshore area for seven years because of an "extensive record of serious worker safety and environmental violations".

The ban was lifted in October 2010, but by February 2011 no one had received a permit to drill because those applying had to prove the ability to contain a spill. A group that included Exxon had developed a system with this capability.

In July 2011 The Heritage Foundation's Robert Bluey reported at Scribe that deepwater drilling permits were down 71% from their historical monthly average of 5.9 permits per month, while shallow-water permits were off 34% from their historical 7.1 monthly average permits.
