= Yavuz Sultan Selim =

Yavuz Sultan Selim or Yavuz Selim may refer to:

- Selim I (1465–1520)
- Yavuz Sultan Selim Bridge, the "Third Bosphorus Bridge" in Istanbul, Turkey
- Yavuz Sultan Selim Mosque in Germany
- Yavuz Selim Mosque in Istanbul
- Yavuz Selim, Etimesgut, neighborhood in Ankara, Turkey
- SMS Goeben, a German battlecruiser renamed Yavuz Selim after she was transferred to the Ottoman Empire, and later known simply as Yavuz

== See also ==
- Yavuz (disambiguation)
