= Deepwater drilling =

Using a drilling rig to bore holes for petroleum extraction in deep sea

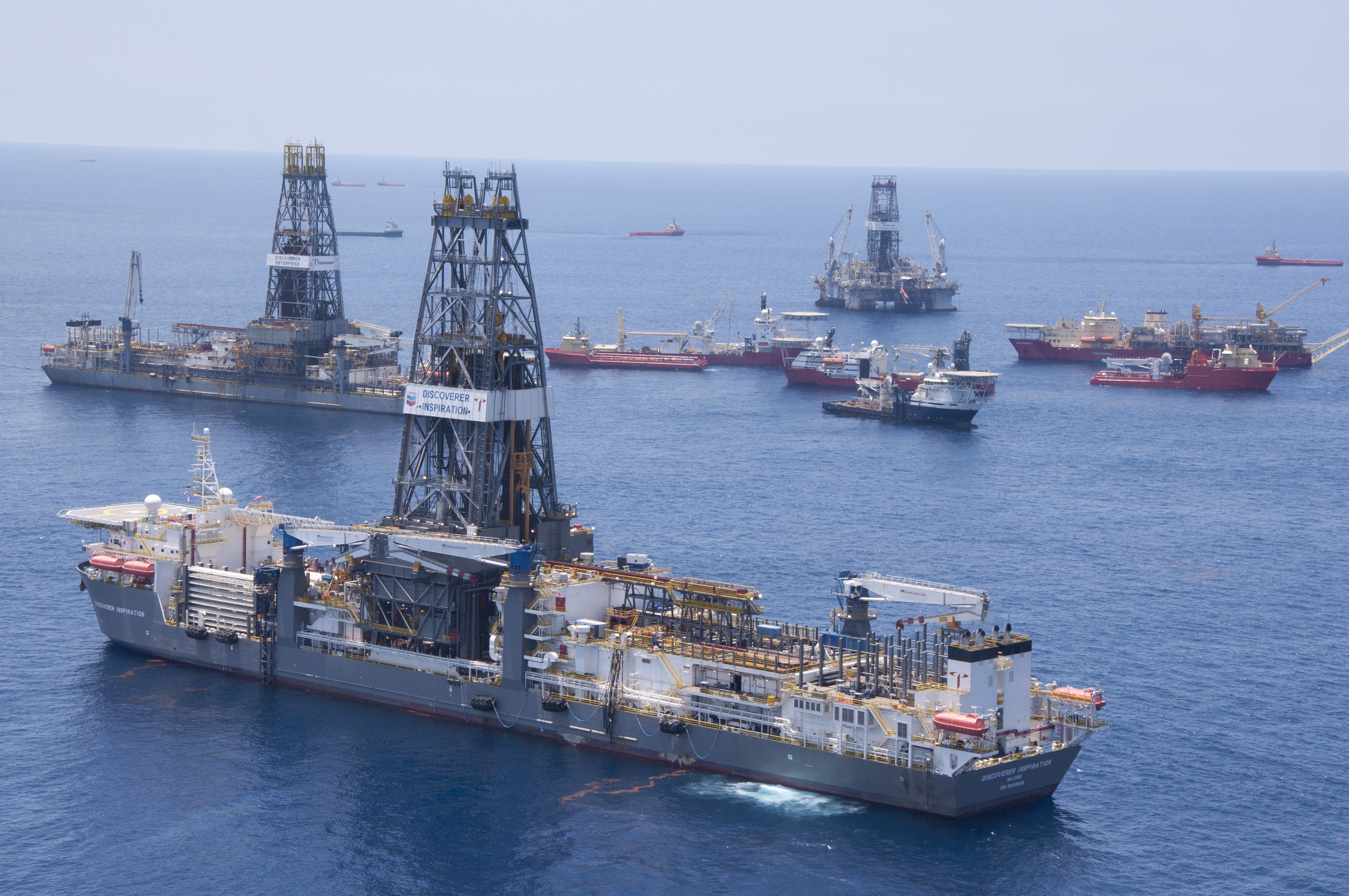
Discoverer Inspiration delivers new containment cap to the Deepwater Horizon oil spill on 10 July 2010. In the background are the Discoverer Enterprise, GSF Development Driller II, and Helix Producer I

Deepwater drilling, or deep well drilling, is the process of creating holes in the Earth's crust using a drilling rig for oil extraction under the deep sea. There are approximately 3400 deepwater wells in the Gulf of Mexico with depths greater than 150 meters.

Deepwater drilling was not technologically or economically feasible for many years, but with rising oil prices, more companies are investing in this sector, with major investors including Halliburton, Diamond Offshore, Transocean, Geoservices, and Schlumberger. The deepwater gas and oil market has been recovering since the 2010 Deepwater Horizon disaster, with total expenditures of around US$35 billion per year in the market and total global capital expenditures of US$167 billion in the years 2010-2014. Industry analysis by business intelligence company Visiongain estimated in 2011 that total expenditures in global deepwater infrastructure would reach US$145 billion.

== Procedure ==
A HowStuffWorks article explains how and why deepwater drilling is practiced:

Not all oil is accessible on land or in shallow water. You can find some oil deposits buried deep under the ocean floor. ... Using sonic equipment, oil companies determine the drilling sites most likely to produce oil. Then they use a mobile offshore drilling unit (MODU) to dig the initial well. Some units are converted into production rigs, meaning they switch from drilling for oil to capturing oil once it's found. Most of the time, the oil company will replace the MODU with a more permanent oil production rig to capture oil. ...The MODU's job is to drill down into the ocean's floor to find oil deposits. The part of the drill that extends below the deck and through the water is called the riser. The riser allows for drilling fluids to move between the floor and the rig. Engineers lower a drill string – a series of pipes designed to drill down to the oil deposit – through the riser.

In the Deepwater Horizon oil spill of 2010, a large explosion occurred, killing workers and spilling oil into the Gulf of Mexico while a BP oil rig was drilling in deep waters.

The expansion of deepwater drilling is happening despite accidents in offshore fields ... Despite the risks, the deepwater drilling trend is spreading in the Mediterranean and off the coast of East Africa after a string of huge discoveries of natural gas. ... The reason for the resumption of such drilling, analysts say, is continuing high demand for energy worldwide.

== Types of deepwater drilling facilities ==
Drilling in deep waters can be performed by two main types of mobile deepwater drilling rigs: semi-submersible drilling rigs and drillships. Drilling can also be performed from a fixed-position installation such as a fixed platform, or a floating platform, such as a spar platform, a tension-leg platform, or a semi-submersible production platform.

1. Fixed Platform (FP) – A Fixed Platform consists of a tall, (usually) steel structure that supports a deck. Because the Fixed Platform is anchored to the sea floor, it is very costly to build. This type of platform can be installed in water depth up to 500 meters (1,600 feet).
2. Jack-Up Rig – Jack-up rigs are mobile units with a floating hull that can be moved around; once they arrived at the desired location, the legs are lowered to the seafloor and locked into place. Then the platform is raised up out of the water. That makes this type of rig safer to work on because weather and waves are not an issue.
3. Compliant Tower (CT) Platform – A compliant tower is a particular type of fixed platform. Both are anchored to the seafloor, and both workplaces are above the water surface. However, the compliant tower is taller and narrower and can operate up to 1 kilometer (3,000 feet) water depth.
4. Semi-Submersible (SEMI) Production Platform – This platform is buoyant, meaning the bulk of it is floating above the surface. However, the well head is typically located on the seafloor, so extra precautions must be taken to prevent a leak. A contributing cause to the oil spill disaster of 2010 was a failure of the leak-preventing system. These rigs can operate anywhere from 200 to 2,000 meters (660 to 6,560 feet) below the surface.
5. Tension-Leg (TLP) Platform – The Tension-leg Platform consists of a floating structure, held in place by tendons that run down to the seafloor. These rigs drill smaller deposits in narrower areas, meaning this is a low-cost way to get a little oil, which attracts many companies. These rigs can drill anywhere from 200 to 1,200 meters (660 to 3,940 feet) below the surface.
6. Subsea System (SS) – Subsea Systems are actually wellheads, which sit on the seafloor and extract oil straight from the ground. They use pipes to force the oil back up to the surface, and can siphon oil to nearby platform rigs, a ship overhead, a local production hub, or even a faraway onshore site. This makes the Subsea system very versatile and a popular choice for companies.
7. Spar Platform (SP) – Spar Platforms use a large cylinder to support the floating deck from the seafloor. On average, about 90% of the Spar Platform's structure is underwater. Most Spar Platforms are used up to depths of 1 kilometer (3,000 feet), but new technology can extend them to function up to 3,500 meters (11,500 feet) below the surface. That makes it one of the deepest drilling rigs in use today.

== 2010 Deepwater Horizon oil spill ==
On 20 April 2010, a BP deepwater oil rig (Deepwater Horizon) exploded, killing 11 and releasing 750,000 cubic meters (200 million gallons) of oil into the Gulf of Mexico. With those numbers, many scientists consider this disaster to be one of the worst environmental disasters in the history of the US.

A large number of animal deaths have resulted from the release of the oil. A Center study estimates that over 82,000 birds, about 6,000 sea turtles, and nearly 26,000 marine mammals were killed from either the initial explosion or the oil spill. Deepwater wellbore integrity has become an increasingly important point in the field of petroleum engineering.

== See also ==
General
Offshore drilling, Well drilling, Shallow water drilling, Extraction of petroleum, Age of Oil, Fossil fuel drilling (disambiguation), Energy development, Hubbert peak theory
Other
2010 United States deepwater drilling moratorium, Submersible pump, IntelliServ, Petroleum industry in Mexico, Deepwater Horizon
People
Michael Klare, Jason Leopold

== External articles ==
- Deepwater Drilling: How It Works | Chevron | Video. chevron.com.
- HowStuffWorks "Ultra Deep Water Oil Drilling". science.howstuffworks.com.
- Rigzone – Deepwater Gulf of Mexico Drilling Activity to Keep Rising. rigzone.com. April 24, 2013.
