= TPAO =

Turkish national oil company

Turkish Petroleum Corporation
- Native name: Türkiye Petrolleri Anonim Ortaklığı
- Type: Public
- Industry: Oil and gas industry
- Founded: December 10, 1954; 71 years ago
- Headquarters: Ankara, Turkey
- Key people: Ahmet Türkoğlu (CEO)
- Products: Petroleum; Petrochemicals
- Revenue: US$ 29.5 billion (2012)
- Net income: US$ 9 billion (2012)
- Total assets: US$ 22.5 billion (2012)
- Total equity: US$ 12.4 billion (2012)
- Number of employees: 4,800 (2013)
- Parent: Turkey Wealth Fund
- Website: www.tpao.gov.tr/en

Turkish Petroleum Corporation (Turkish: Türkiye Petrolleri Anonim Ortaklığı, TPAO) has been established in order to perform hydrocarbon exploration, drilling, production, refinery and marketing activities on behalf of the Republic of Türkiye with the Law No. 6327 in 1954.

TPAO contributed to the establishment of several companies in Turkey's petroleum industry, including PETKİM, TÜPRAŞ, BOTAŞ and Petrol Ofisi.

TPAO continued exploration, production, refining, marketing and transportation activities until 1983 as an integrated oil company. TPAO has been acting as a publicly owned exploration and production oil company since the legal regulations made in 1983 and some other more recent changes.

TPAO’s primary goal is to reduce Turkey’s oil and gas import.

== Exploration ==
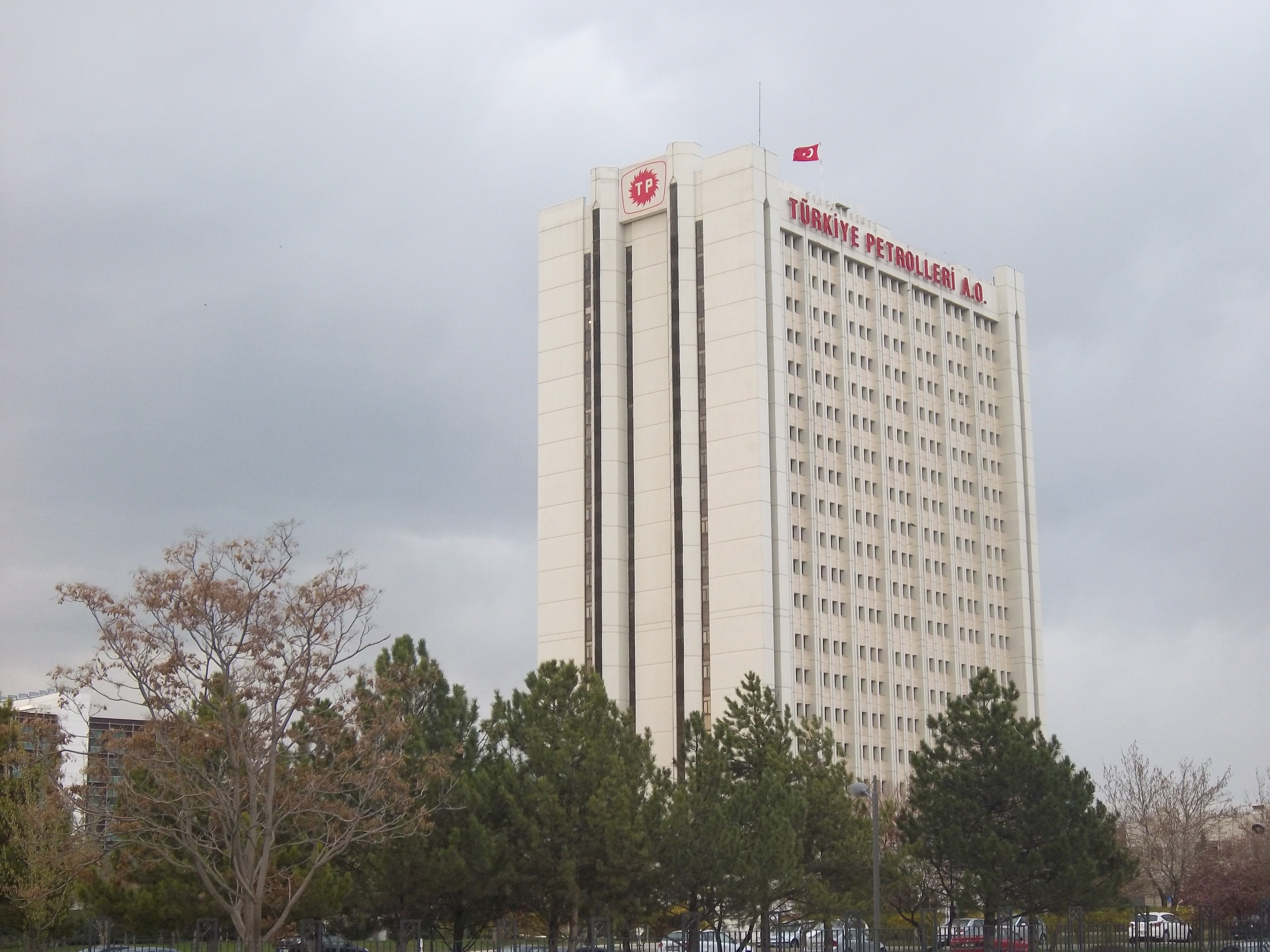
TPAO building in Ankara

In 2013, the company purchased the seismographic research/survey vessel RV Barbaros Hayreddin Paşa worth US$130 million for gas and oil field exploration in Black Sea and the Mediterranean Sea.

== Fleet ==
| Name | Built by | Type | Generation | Acquired | Note |
|---|---|---|---|---|---|
| Barbaros Hayreddin Paşa | (United Arab Emirates) Polarcus | Seismic research vessel | - | 2013 | |
| MTA Oruç Reis | (Turkey) İstanbul Naval Shipyard | Seismic research vessel | - | 2017 | |
| Fatih | (South Korea) Hyundai Heavy Industries | Ultra deepwater drillship | Sixth | 2017 | |
| Yavuz | (South Korea) Samsung Heavy Industries | Ultra deepwater drillship | Sixth | 2018 | |
| Kanuni | (South Korea) Samsung Heavy Industries | Ultra deepwater drillship | Sixth | 2020 | |
| Abdülhamid Han | (South Korea) Daewoo Shipbuilding & Marine Engineering | Ultra deepwater drillship | Seventh | 2021 | |
| Osman Gazi | (South Korea) Hyundai Heavy Industries | Floating production storage and offloading | - | 2025 | |

== Projects ==
Azerbaijan:

- Azeri–Chirag–Gunashli oil field (5.73% stake)
- Shah Deniz gas field (19% stake)
- Baku–Tbilisi–Ceyhan Pipeline (6.53% stake)
- South Caucasus Pipeline (9% stake)
- Alov exploration project (10% stake)

Iraq:

- Badra oil field (10% stake)
- Missan oil fields (11.25% stake)
- Siba gas field (40% stake)
- Mansuriya gas field (37.5% stake; operator)
- BP Energy Company of Kirkuk Limited (15% stake), which holds interests in the Kirkuk oil fields.

Russia:

- BaiTex LLC (49% stake), holder of the hydrocarbon licences for the Baituganskoye field and Yerilkinsky block in the Volga–Ural region.

== Finance ==
In 2019, TPAO made an operating loss of 239 thousand lira for each of its 3,700 employees.
