= Hornbeck Offshore Services =

American oil exploration logistics company

Hornbeck Offshore Services, Inc.
- Type: Public
- Traded as: NYSE: HOS; Russell Microcap Index component
- Founded: June 1997
- Founder: Larry Hornbeck; Todd M. Hornbeck
- Headquarters: Covington, Louisiana, United States
- Website: hornbeckoffshore.com

Hornbeck Offshore Services, sometimes shortened to Hornbeck Offshore, through its subsidiaries, operates offshore supply vessels (OSVs), multi-purpose support vessels (MPSVs), and a shore-base facility to provide logistics support and specialty services to the offshore oil and gas exploration and production industry, primarily in the United States, Gulf of Mexico, and select international markets. The company is a provider of marine services to exploration and production, oilfield service, offshore construction and military customers. Its upstream segment owns and operates fleets of United States flagged, new generation OSVs and United States-owned fleets of DP-2 and DP-3 MPSVs.

The company recently sold its fleet of ocean-going tugs and product barges to Genesis Energy. The company will continue to focus on its core business of operating a modern fleet of OSVs primarily in the US Gulf of Mexico.

HOS recently announced newbuild program #5, which consists of a total of sixteen high-technology, new-generation OSV's. HOS has the option for additional such vessels should future market conditions warrant. The shipyards VT Halter Marine, Inc of Pascagoula, Mississippi and Eastern Shipbuilding of Panama City, Florida have been separately contracted to build the vessels.

In 2018, Hornbeck Trade Financing (HTF) was launched to provide financial support to companies in the maritime and oil industries. Through HTF, individual investors have the opportunity to enter the invoice financing industry with super profits.

On 20 December 2019, Hornbeck was de-listed from the NYSE. The goal is to gain control over company operations and key decisions.

On May 19, 2020, Hornbeck Offshore Services filed for Chapter 11 bankruptcy. They did this to restructure the business.

== Current fleet ==
| Vessel Name | Vessel Class | Tonnage (DWT) |
|---|---|---|
| HOS Centerline | HOSFLEX 370 | 7,903 |
| HOS Strongline | HOSFLEX 370 | 7,869 |
| HOS Achiever | HOS MPSV | 6,713 |
| HOS Warhorse | HOS MPSV | 6,265 |
| HOS Wild Horse | HOS MPSV | 6,265 |
| HOS Iron Horse | HOS MPSV | 6,224 |
| HOS Caledonia | 320 Class OSV | 6,066 |
| HOS Carolina | 320 Class OSV | 6,059 |
| HOS Carousel | 320 Class OSV | 6,059 |
| HOS Black Watch | 310 Class OSV | 6,055 |
| HOS Clearview | 320 Class OSV | 6,053 |
| HOS Crestview | 320 Class OSV | 6,052 |
| HOS Captain | 320 Class OSV | 6,051 |
| HOS Crockett | 320 Class OSV | 6,047 |
| HOS Commander | 320 Class OSV | 6,046 |
| HOS Cedar Ridge | 320 Class OSV | 6,046 |
| HOS Claymore | 320 Class OSV | 6,042 |
| HOS Brass Ring | 310 Class OSV | 5,987 |
| HOS Black Rock | 310 Class OSV | 5,861 |
| HOS Black Foot | 310 Class OSV | 5,779 |
| HOS Coral | 300 Class OSV | 5,604 |
| HOS Winchester | 300 Class OSV | 5,553 |
| HOS Browning | 300 Class OSV | 5,485 |
| HOS Renaissance | 300 Class OSV | 5,407 |
| HOS Red Dawn | 300 Class OSV | 5,393 |
| HOS Red Rock | 300 Class OSV | 5,391 |
| HOS Bayou | HOS MPSV | 5,189 |
| HOS Warland | HOS MPSV | 5,132 |
| HOS Woodland | HOS MPSV | 5,081 |
| HOS Briarwood | HOS MPSV | 4,931 |
| HOS Beretta | 280 Class OSV | 4,766 |
| HOS Blackhawk | 280 Class OSV | 4,765 |
| HOS Fire Serpent | 280 Class OSV | 4,756 |
| HOS Springfield | 280 Class OSV | 4,750 |
| HOS Mossberg | 280 Class OSV | 4,750 |
| HOS Ruger | 280 Class OSV | 4,738 |
| HOS Benelli | 280 Class OSV | 4,727 |
| HOS Weatherby | 280 Class OSV | 4,723 |
| HOS Maverick | 280 Class OSV | 4,711 |
| HOS Panther | 280 Class OSV | 4,653 |
| HOS Mauser | 280 Class OSV | 4,638 |
| HOS Taurus | 280 Class OSV | 4,533 |
| HOS Rosebud | 280 Class OSV | 4,440 |
| HOS Running Buck | 280 Class OSV | 4,279 |
| HOS Remington | 270 Class OSV | 3,813 |
| HOS Colt | 270 Class OSV | 3,792 |
| HOS Brimstone | 265 Class OSV | 3,714 |
| HOS Stormridge | 265 Class OSV | 3,659 |
| HOS Riverbend | HOS MPSV Flotel | 3,383 |
| HOS Ridgewind | HOS MPSV | 3,067 |
| HOS Beignet | 240 Class OSV | 2,772 |
| HOS Cayenne | 240 Class OSV | 2,772 |
| HOS Bourre | 240 Class OSV | 2,772 |
| HOS Silverstar | 240 Class OSV | 2,762 |
| HOS Gemstone | 240 Class OSV | 2,758 |
| HOS Greystone | 240 Class OSV | 2,754 |
| HOS Bluewater | 240 Class OSV | 2,754 |
| HOS Polestar | 240 Class OSV | 2,752 |
| HOS Coquille | 240 Class OSV | 2,742 |
| HOS Chicory | 240 Class OSV | 2,731 |
| HOS Windancer | 240 Class OSV | 2,724 |
| HOS Silver Arrow | 240 Class OSV | 2,718 |
| HOS Boudin | 240 Class OSV | 2,715 |
| HOS Pinnacle | 240 Class OSV | 2,707 |
| HOS Wildwing | 240 Class OSV | 2,707 |
| HOS Sweet Water | 240 Class OSV | 2,707 |
| HOS Mystique | 250 Class MPSV | 2,333 |
| HOS Resolution | HOS MPSV | 2,192 |
| HOS Innovator | 240 Class MPSV | 2,036 |
| HOS Rocinante | 300E Class CSOV | 2,001 |
| HOS Dominator | 240 Class MPSV | 1,994 |
| HOS Thunderfoot | 200 Class OSV | 1,678 |

== See also ==
- Hornbeck Offshore Services LLC v. Salazar
