= Appaloosa (disambiguation) =

The Appaloosa is a horse breed known for its leopard-spotted coat markings and other distinctive physical characteristics.

Appaloosa may also refer to:

- The Appaloosa, a 1966 Western film starring Marlon Brando
- Appaloosa (novel), a 2005 novel by Robert B. Parker
- Appaloosa (film), a 2008 Western film directed by and starring Ed Harris
- Appaloosa (band), a French electronic duo
- "Appaloosa," a single from Gino Vannelli's 1978 album Brother to Brother
- Appaloosa oil field, an offshore oil field
- Appaloosa Interactive, a video game company
- "Apollousa, Bow of the Goddess", a card in the Yu-Gi-Oh Trading Card Game
- Appaloosa Management, an American hedge fund
- Appaloosa bean, a type of bean
- Appaloosa Music Festival, an annual roots music festival in Front Royal, Virginia
- Appaloosa Bones, a 2023 album by Gregory Alan Isakov
- Appaloosa, a two-person group that had a No. 178 album on the Billboard Top LPs
- Appaloosa, a 1969 album by the group above
- Appaloosa (EP), a 2025 extended play by Orville Peck

== See also ==
- Appalousa, a historical Native American tribe of Louisiana
- Opelousas, Louisiana, a small city named for the tribe
