= Deepwater Discovery =

Ship built in 2000

History
- Name: Deepwater Discovery
- Owner: Transocean
- Operator: Transocean Offshore Deepwater Drilling Inc.
- Port of registry: Port Vila, Vanuatu
- Builder: Samsung Heavy Industries Co. Ltd.; Geoje, South Korea
- Laid down: 27 August 1999
- Acquired: 25 July 2000
- Identification: ABS class no.:0039079; Call sign: YJVY6; DNV ID: 24036; IMO number: 9203679

General characteristics
- Class & type: American Bureau of Shipping; A1, drilling unit, MODU
- Tonnage: 59,632 GT; 98,000 DWT
- Length: 230.48 m (756.2 ft)
- Beam: 42 m (138 ft)
- Draught: 19 m (62 ft)
- Depth: 19 m (62 ft)
- Installed power: 4 × Wärtsilä 8L46B diesel electric engine rated at 7.8 mW(10,460 hp ea.); 2 × Wärtsilä 6L46B (7,845 hp ea.) diesel gensets
- Propulsion: 6 × Aquamaster Azimuth type thrusters, 5500KW
- Capacity: Cargo ballast: 81,085 m^{3} (2,863,500 cu ft); Cargo oil: 14,420 m^{3} (509,000 cu ft); Freshwater: 1,617 m^{3} (57,100 cu ft); Fuel oil: 5,378 m^{3} (189,900 cu ft); Hold: 81,085 m^{3} (2,863,500 cu ft)
- Crew: ~ 140

Deepwater Discovery was a Samsung/Reading & Bates designed, fifth generation, deepwater dynamic positioning Vanuatu-flagged drillship owned and operated by Transocean. The vessel was capable of drilling in water depths up to 3,049 m (10,000 ft) using an 18.75 in (47.6 cm), 15,000 psi blowout preventer (BOP), and a 21 in (53 cm) outside diameter (OD) marine riser. It was retired in 2018.

From 2000 to 2009 the vessel flew the flag of Panama.
