= Discoverer Clear Leader =

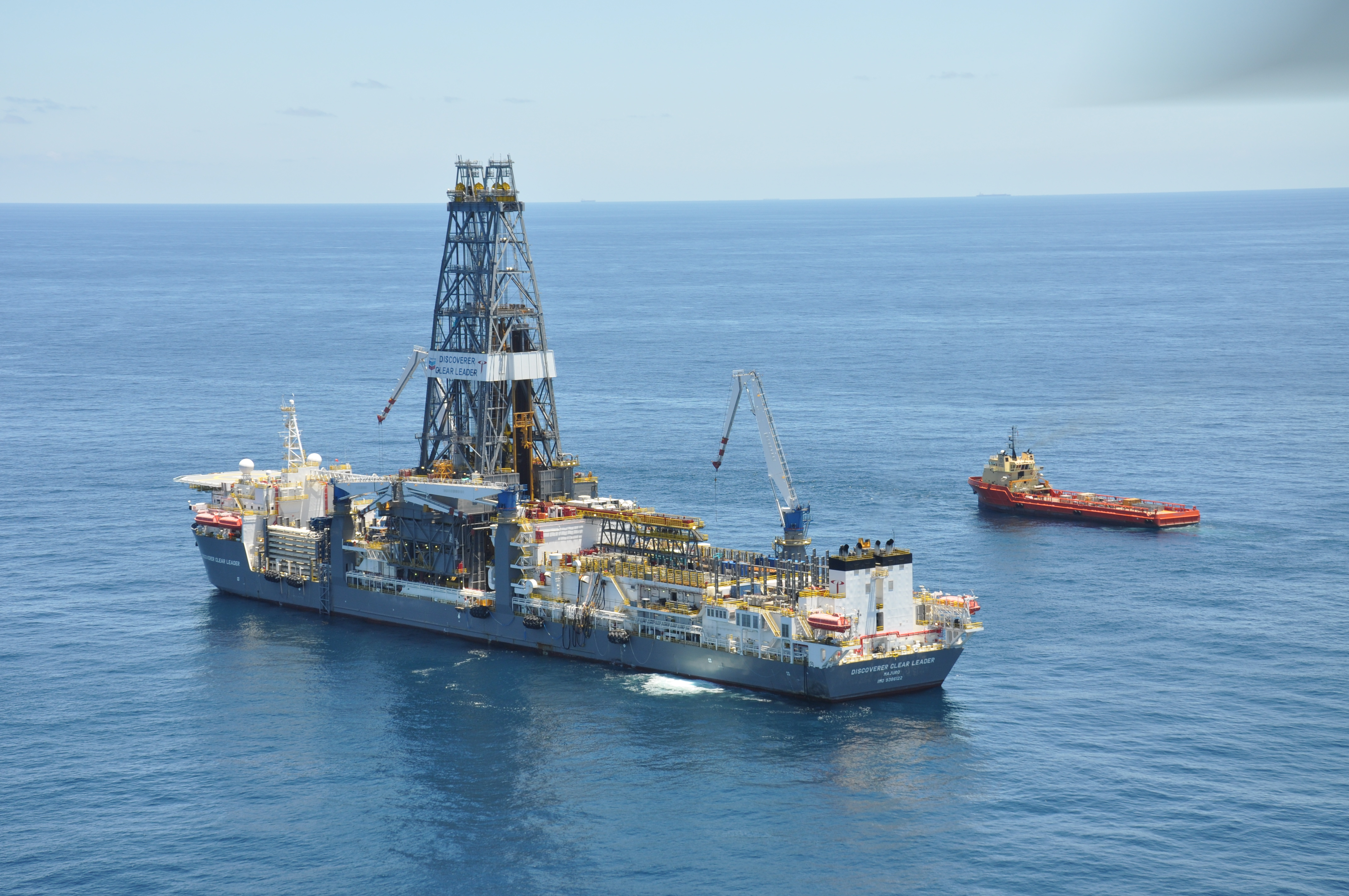
- Ship going to the Deepwater Horizon oil spill on 9 July 2010

History
- Name: Discoverer Clear Leader
- Owner: Triton Asset Leasing GmbH
- Operator: Transocean
- Port of registry: Marshall Islands, Majuro
- Ordered: 27 February 2006
- Builder: Daewoo Shipbuilding & Marine Engineering; Okpo, South Korea
- Laid down: 6 August 2007
- Launched: 10 November 2007
- Completed: 2009
- Identification: Call sign: V7MO2; DNV ID: 27186; IMO number: 9386122; MMSI number: 538002877
- Status: Operational

General characteristics
- Class & type: Det Norske Veritas
- Tonnage: 65,573 GT; 10,100 DWT
- Length: 254.4 m (835 ft)
- Beam: 38 m (125 ft)
- Draught: 13 m (43 ft)
- Depth: 19 m (62 ft)

Discoverer Clear Leader is a double hulled dynamically positioned drillship, capable of operating in moderate environments and water depths up to 12,000 feet (3,657m) using an 18.75 in (47.6 cm), 15,000 psi blowout preventer (BOP), and a 21 in (53 cm) outside diameter (OD) marine riser. The Marshall Islands-flagged vessel is owned by Transocean, and is operating in the Gulf of Mexico of the United States.

== Sister ships ==
Discoverer Clear Leader design is a "Transocean Offshore enhanced Enterprise-class" and has four other sister ships: Discoverer Americas, Discoverer Inspiration, Discoverer Luanda, and Discoverer India.

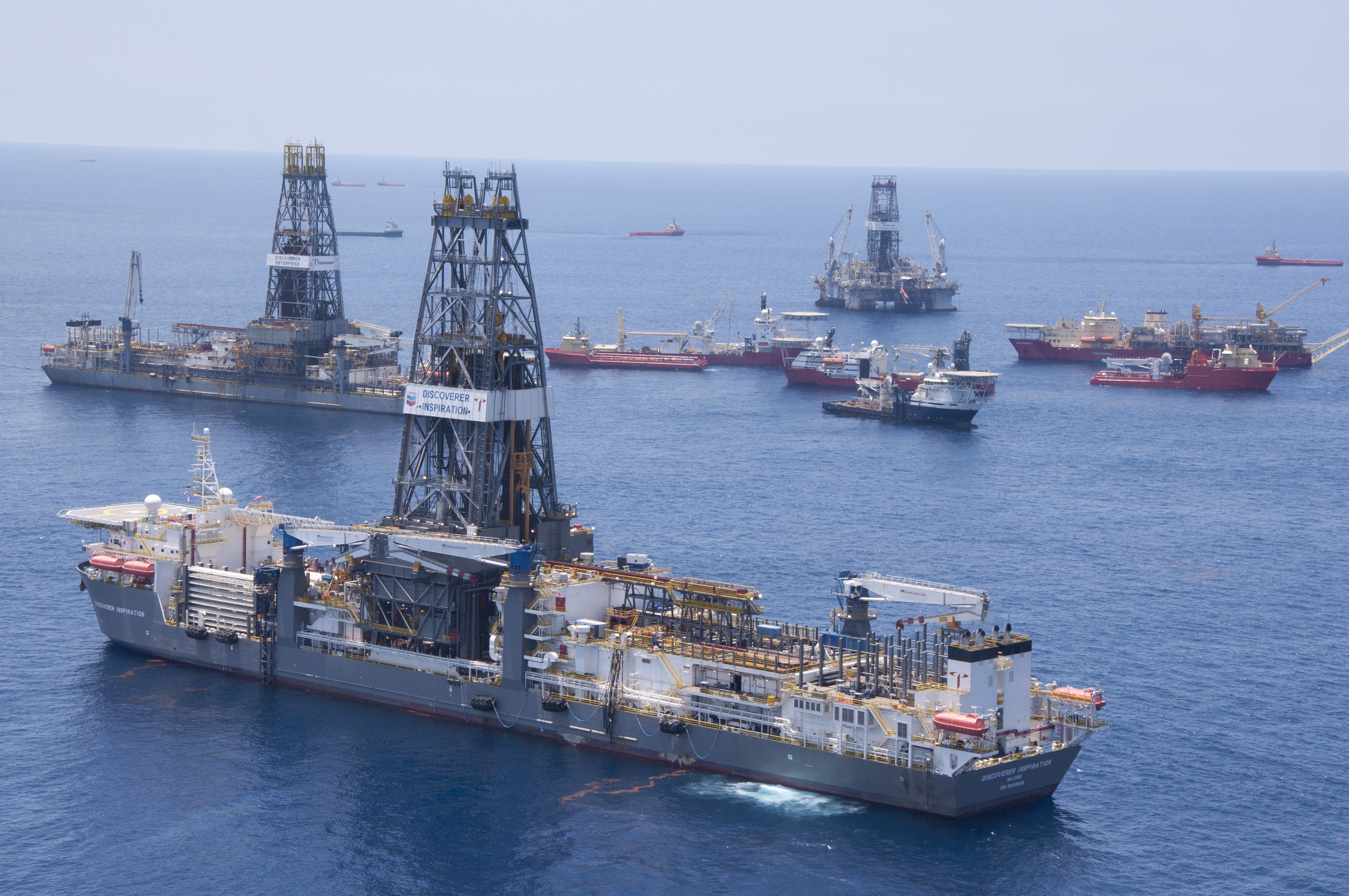
Discoverer Inspiration delivers new containment cap to the Deepwater Horizon oil spill on 10 July 2010. In the background are the Discoverer Enterprise, GSF Development Driller II, and Helix Producer I
