= Deepwater Millennium =

History
- Name: Deepwater Millennium
- Owner: Triton Hungary Asset Management
- Operator: Transocean
- Port of registry: Marshall Islands, Majuro
- Builder: Samsung Heavy Industries; Geoje, South Korea
- Laid down: 21 July 1998
- Launched: 30 April 1999
- Identification: ABS class no: 9936928; Call sign: V7HD2; DNV ID: 24035; IMO number: 9180229

General characteristics
- Tonnage: 60,083 GT; 103,000 DWT
- Length: 221.5 m (727 ft)
- Beam: 42 m (138 ft)
- Depth: 20 m (66 ft)
- Installed power: 3 × Wärtsilä 18V32 9,333 hp diesel gensets; 3 × Wärtsilä 12V32 6,266 hp diesel gensets
- Propulsion: 6 × Kamewa 4,000 kW azimuth thrusters
- Capacity: Cargo oil: 15,870 m^{3} (560,000 cu ft); Freshwater: 1,355 m^{3} (47,900 cu ft); Fuel oil: 5,378 m^{3} (189,900 cu ft); Tank ballast: 81,085 m^{3} (2,863,500 cu ft)

Deepwater Millennium was a fifth generation Samsung/Reading & Bates designed, dynamic positioned (DP) Marshall Islands-flagged drillship owned by Transocean. The vessel was capable of drilling in water depths up to 8,100 ft (upgradable to 10,000 ft) using an 18.75 in (47.6 cm), 15,000 psi blowout preventer (BOP), and a 21 in (53 cm) outside diameter (OD) marine riser. It was retired in 2018.

== History ==
Built originally for R&B Falcon, she was completed in 1999 by Samsung Heavy Industries in Geoje, South Korea. In 2001 R&B Falcon merged with Transocean Sedco-Forex. She is the third of four Deepwater Pathfinder class ships.

After initial work in the Gulf of Mexico, Deepwater Millennium has drilled wells off West and East Africa and Brazil. With the exception of one well off Nova Scotia in the summer of 2002, she was in the Gulf continuously from 2001 to 2008. Her work includes wells for Kerr-McGee, Pioneer, Marathon Oil, Mariner, Chevron Corporation, Anadarko Petroleum, Statoil, and Petrobras. More recently she was drilling off the coast of Western Australia on an 18-month contract for Woodside Petroleum.
