= Appaloosa oil field =

American oil field in the Gulf of Mexico

Coordinates: 28.5°N 89.0°W

- Country: United States
- Region: Gulf of Mexico
- Location: Mississippi Canyon
- Blocks: 459, 460, 503, and 504
- Offshore/onshore: offshore
- Operator: Eni

Field history
- Discovery: May 2008
- Start of development: December 2008

Appaloosa is an offshore oil field located in the Mississippi Canyon blocks 459, 460, 503, and 504 of the United States sector of the Gulf of Mexico. It is a part of the Greater Longhorn area. The field is developed by the Italian energy company Eni.

== History ==
Eni submitted an application to drill, complete and test five exploratory wells on the Appaloosa prospect in 2005. Two wells were drilled in 2007 by the Transocean-owned drillship Deepwater Millennium. However, oil was not discovered. In May 2008, oil was discovered by the Transocean-owned semi-submersible drilling rig GSF Celtic Sea The field development was approved in December 2008. A development well is drilled by semi-submersible drilling rig Transocean Amirante.

In June 2010, Eni stopped development of the project due to the Deepwater Horizon oil spill.

== Development ==
The wells will be tied-back to the Corral platform (previously named the Crystal platform). The contract for the tie-back engineering and construction is awarded to Technip. Offshore installations are done by Technip's deepwater pipe-laying ship Deep Blue.
