= Astilleros y Talleres del Noroeste =

Spanish shipbuilding company

ASTANO or Astilleros y Talleres del Noroeste (English: Shipyards and Workshops of the Northwest) is a shipbuilding company based in Fene, Ferrolterra, Spain, near the city of Ferrol, which flourished during the 1960s and the early 1970s coinciding with the end of the Francisco Franco era and the arrival of democracy. From the late 1980s and early 1990s the possibility of joining the other shipyards of Ferrolterra and from the year 2000 forms an integral part of NAVANTIA formerly IZAR.

== See also ==
- Discoverer Enterprise drillship, utilised in rectifying the Deepwater Horizon oil spill.
- Castillo de Salas, a bulk carrier that wrecked by Gijón loaded with coal in 1986.
