= Resolution (Parker novel) =

2008 novel by Robert B. Parker

- First edition
- Author: Robert B. Parker
- Language: English
- Series: Everett Hitch series
- Genre: Western
- Publisher: Putnam Adult
- Publication date: June 3, 2008
- Publication place: United States
- Media type: Hardcover
- Pages: 292
- ISBN: 0-399-15504-X
- OCLC: 178210022
- Dewey Decimal: 813/.54 22
- LC Class: PS3566.A686 R47 2008
- Preceded by: Appaloosa
- Followed by: Brimstone

Resolution is a 2008 Western novel by Robert B. Parker. It is a sequel to the 2005 novel, Appaloosa. It was followed in 2009 by Brimstone.

== Plot ==
In the American Old West, two honorable gunfighters get caught up in a gritty battle that threatens the peaceful town of Resolution.
