= The Weatherman (album) =

Studio album by Gregory Alan Isakov
- Released: July 9, 2013
- Studio: "The Mountain House"
- Genre: Indie folk
- Length: 41:35
- Label: Suitcase Town Music
- Producers: Gregory Alan Isakov; Jamie Mefford

Gregory Alan Isakov chronology
This Empty Northern Hemisphere (2009)	The Weatherman (2013)	Gregory Alan Isakov with the Colorado Symphony (2016)

The Weatherman is the third full-length album by Gregory Alan Isakov, released in 2013. The album was recorded in solitude outside the quiet mountain town of Nederland, Colorado over the course of a year and a half.

The Weatherman peaked at number 102 on the Billboard 200 albums chart during a two-week stay on the chart.

== Background ==
Explaining the new album, Isakov said, "To me, the idea of a weatherman is really powerful. There's a guy on television or on the radio telling us the future, and nobody cares. It's this daily mundane miracle, and I think the songs I chose are about noticing the beauty in normal, everyday life." Nathaniel Rateliff provided background vocals.

== Reception ==
Simon Holland of Folk Radio wrote of the album – "There is an overall consistency of approach. This is an album of gentle swells, intimate voices, with ripples of grace notes and heavenly choirs adding to the emotional ebb and flow. It’s a gently paced 41 and a bit minutes of music that is quietly beguiling, rather than attention seeking, but when you do pay proper intent, the rewards are many."

Jedd Ferris from The Washington Post said, "From start to finish, the album keeps an even-keel mood, but in an age of ubiquitous Americana genre mashing, it's a welcome change of pace."

== Track listing ==
All tracks are written by Gregory Alan Isakov, except where noted.

The Weatherman track listing
No.	Title	Writer(s)	Length
1.	"Amsterdam"		3:18
2.	"Saint Valentine"		3:23
3.	"Second Chances"		3:49
4.	"Living Proof"		4:17
5.	"Time Will Tell"		2:47
6.	"O' City Lights"		2:39
7.	"Astronaut"		2:09
8.	"California Open Back"		1:20
9.	"The Universe"	Ron Scott	4:16
10.	"Suitcase Full of Sparks"	Isakov, J. Wagner, Ron Scott	3:56
11.	"Honey, It's Alright"		3:11
12.	"All Shades of Blue"	Isakov, Ron Scott, additional words by Annie Stein	3:33
13.	"She Always Takes It Black"		2:50
Total length:			41:35

== Personnel ==
- Gregory Alan Isakov – vocals, guitars, banjo, piano, organ, keyboards, drums, ukulele, pedal steel
- Jamie Mefford – drums, god noises, background vocals
- Phil Baker – cello, background vocals
- Jeb Bows – violin, viola, mandolin, background vocals
- James Han – piano, organ
- Bonnie May Paine – saw, washboard, background vocals
- Nathaniel Rateliff – background vocals
- Julie Davis – background vocals
- Natalie Tate – background vocals
- Reed Foehl – background vocals
- John Grigsby – upright bass, electric bass
- Wil Schlatmann – accordion
- Reyn Ouwehand – mellotron, timpani, piano

Production

- Gregory Alan Isakov, Jamie Mefford – executive production
- Gregory Alan Isakov, Jamie Mefford, Reyn Ouwehand (on "Second Chances") – engineering
- David Glasser – mastering
