= Brimstone (Parker novel) =

2009 novel by Robert B. Parker

- First edition
- Author: Robert B. Parker
- Language: English
- Series: Everett Hitch series
- Genre: Western
- Publisher: Putnam Adult
- Publication date: May 5, 2009
- Publication place: United States
- Media type: Hardcover
- Pages: 304
- ISBN: 0-399-15571-6
- Preceded by: Resolution
- Followed by: Blue-Eyed Devil

Brimstone is a 2009 Western novel by Robert B. Parker. It is the third novel featuring Everett Hitch and Virgil Cole and it follows the events of Appaloosa and Resolution.

== Plot ==
Freelance gunslingers for hire Virgil Cole and Everett Hitch ride into yet another town and treat it to another baptism of fire.

== Critical reception ==
Kirkus Reviews said "No surprises, but provides some excellent evidence for anyone who wants to argue that Spenser’s creator has been writing nothing but westerns for 35 years."
