= AHTS Bourbon Dolphin =

Anchor handling tug supply vessel of Bourbon Offshore Norway

- AHTS Bourbon Dolphin sinking in the North Sea

History

Norway
- Name: AHTS Bourbon Dolphin
- Owner: Bourbon Offshore Norway AS
- Builder: Ulstein Verft AS, Ulstein Municipality
- Launched: 27 February 2006
- In service: 2006
- Out of service: 2007
- Identification: IMO number: 9351983
- Fate: Foundered 15 April 2007

General characteristics
- Class & type: Ulstein A102 AHTS
- Tonnage: 2,985 GT
- Length: 75.2 m (247 ft)
- Beam: 17 m (56 ft)
- Draught: 6.5 m (21 ft) (max)
- Installed power: 12,000 kW
- Propulsion: 4 × 3,000 kW at 750 rpm
- Speed: 17.5 knots (32.4 km/h; 20.1 mph) (trial)
- Capacity: 800 t (deck)
- Complement: 15

AHTS Bourbon Dolphin was an anchor handling tug supply vessel of Bourbon Offshore Norway. The ship capsized off the coast of Shetland on 12 April 2007, and sank three days later while preparations were being made to tow her to shore.

== History ==
Bourbon Dolphin was built at the Ulstein Verft in 2006, the "Ulstein A102" design. She was part of a three-ship contract with Bourbon, the two others being the Bourbon Orca and Bourbon Mistral.

On 21 February 2007 Bourbon Dolphin succeeded in pulling the German mine hunter Grömitz to sea again after she had run aground near Florø.

Less than two months later, on 12 April she capsized with 15 Norwegian sailors aboard. Eight were picked up by vessels already on scene and two were found by Her Majesty's Coastguard, while five are still missing. Three of the ten recovered were reported dead. The incident happened while Bourbon Dolphin was anchoring the semi-submersible drilling platform Transocean Rather. The 99-man crew of the Rather was evacuated by the RAF.

On Sunday 15 April, Bourbon Dolphin sank in 1,100 metres of water off the coast of Shetland, Scotland at 59.9305°N 0.439333°W.

In January 2009 Bourbon Offshore Norway was fined 5 million Norwegian kroner (€530,000 at the time) after a Norwegian government Commission of Inquiry raised doubts about the ability of both the vessel and its crew to handle large anchors in such deep water. Norway's national prosecutor said the new captain, who died with his son in the sinking, had not been given enough time to learn about the crew and ship, as he only had 90 minutes to take over.
