= The Sabertooth Vampire =

The Sabertooth Vampire, vexed once again by his cumbersome fangs

The Sabertooth Vampire is a fictional character created by Mike Russell, an artist/writer who lives in Portland, Oregon. The character first appeared on Russell's Twitter feed as a sketch and has gone on to be included in a series of webcomics, two published compilations and several issues of Dark Horse Presents.

== Publication history and origins ==
Russell, who writes regular movie reviews for The Oregonian, a daily newspaper in Portland, created the Sabertooth Vampire in January 2011 while waiting for a preview screening of The Mechanic to begin. He drew a sketch of a pint-sized vampire with oversized teeth and a Napoleon complex. He later posted the image on his Twitter feed with the caption "My attempt to find a new angle for the young-adult vampire-fiction market." Dylan Meconis, a Portland-based illustrator, encouraged Russell to further develop the character. This, coupled with a favorable response from Russell's readers, led him to create a series of black and white webcomics that were later assembled into two print collections.

The series has, thus far, been released in periodic "seasons" ala a television program. The first season was compiled in a collection and released in early 2011. A follow-up, titled The Sabertooth Vampire: Unleashed, appeared that October and included comics from season two of the series. Russell announced a third season, tentatively scheduled for early 2013, at an event in Portland in December 2012. It was published in the summer of 2016.

During the spring and summer of 2012, issues 12, 14 and 15 of Dark Horse Presents included Sabertooth Vampire comic strips, one of which featured an encounter between the titular character and Hellboy, the popular comic book hero. The strips marked the first appearance of the character in color, compliments of Portland cartoonist Bill Mudron.

== Fictional character biography ==
The true origins of the Sabertooth Vampire are unknown but the series offers two theories. In one strip, the character evolves from a sabertooth caveman and becomes the Sabertooth Vampire after touching the mysterious monolith featured in the opening scene of 2001: A Space Odyssey. In another strip titled "Secret Origins of the Sabertooth Vampire,' he's portrayed as the son of two modern-day vampires. His father is presented as a normal vampire with conventional fangs but his mother possesses much longer ones ala a sabertooth tiger, which the character was also born with. Like more prototypical vampires, the Sabertooth Vampire requires human blood to survive, appears invisible in mirrors and can turn into a bat but he remains impervious to sunlight and ages much like a human being. His childhood was fraught with traumatic experiences, which included awkward attempts at courtship, high school sports and theatrical productions as revealed in "I Was a Teenaged Sabertooth Vampire."

Over the course of the series, the Sabertooth Vampire routinely finds himself heavily burdened by his short stature and the weight of his long, cumbersome fangs. Nevertheless, this hasn't prevented him from embarking on a series of misadventures that have included trips into outer space, failed attempts at romance, car chases, roller derbies and a starring role in a commercial for a cereal called "Saber O's." He is often aided and rescued from various predicaments by Renfield, the character from Bram Stoker's 1897 novel Dracula. The strip's second season concludes with a cliffhanger after the Sabertooth Vampire uses a spray called "Vamp Away" to turn into a human after becoming frustrated with his long fangs and inability to shave with a mirror. His transformation renders him a mortal but, unfortunately, one with humongous incisors. Unsatisfied with his new form, in the strip's final panel he begs a group of disdainful vampires to turn him back into a member of the undead.

In issue # 14 of Dark Horse Presents, the Sabertooth Vampire encountered Hellboy, the popular comic book hero, in a strip titled "Hellboy vs. the Sabertooth Vampire." Their conflict ended in a draw after the vampire's fangs became perpetually stuck in Hellboy's stone hand.
