= Discoverer Enterprise =

Drillship

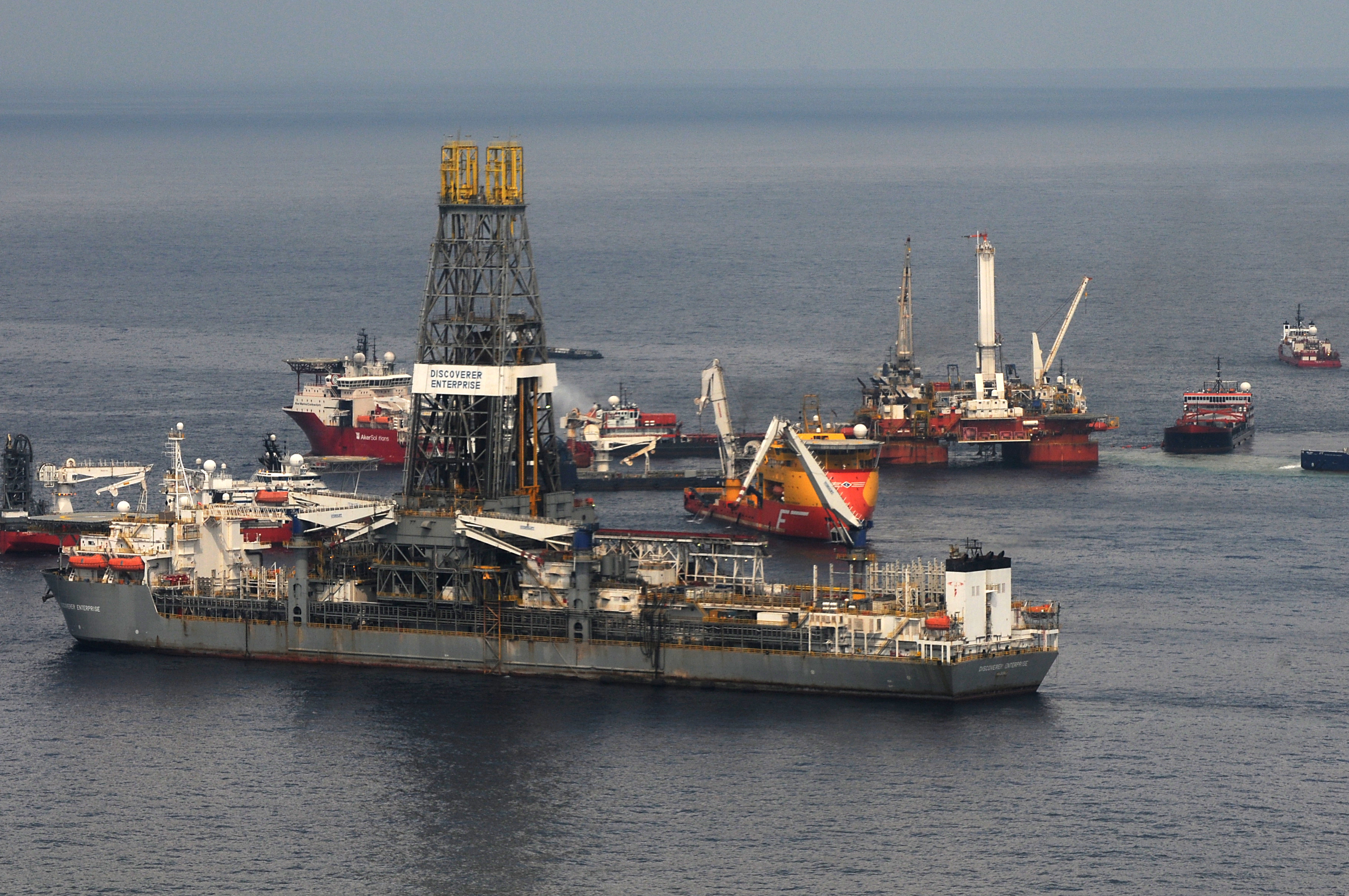
- Discoverer Enterprise in the foreground on May 26, 2010, directly over the blowout preventer during the top kill procedure in the Deepwater Horizon disaster.

History
- Name: Discoverer Enterprise
- Owner: Triton Asset Leasing GmbH
- Operator: Transocean Offshore Deepwater Drilling Inc.
- Port of registry: Marshall Islands, Majuro
- Builder: Astilleros y Talleres del Noroeste (ASTANO), Fene, Spain
- Laid down: 14 March 1997
- Launched: 1 August 1998
- Completed: 1999
- Identification: Call sign: V7HD2; DNV ID: 19643; IMO number: 9186792; MMSI number: 538002215
- Fate: Scrapped in 2019/2020

General characteristics
- Type: DNV 1A1 Ship-shaped Drilling Unit Storage Unit HELDK CRANE E0 DYNPOS-AUTR
- Tonnage: 69,500 DWT; 63,190 GT
- Length: 254.4 m (835 ft)
- Beam: 38.05 m (124.8 ft)
- Draught: 13 m (43 ft)
- Propulsion: 6 × Cegelec 5500kw, 1260vac; 6 × AC Aquamaster 7000hp thrusters
- Capacity: Liquid Mud: 2,447 m^{3} (86,400 cu ft); Drill Water: 2,177 m^{3} (76,900 cu ft); Potable Water: 794 m^{3} (28,000 cu ft); Fuel Oil: 3,972 m^{3} (140,300 cu ft); Bulk Mud: 453 m^{3} (16,000 cu ft); Bulk Cement: 453 m^{3} (16,000 cu ft)
- Crew: > 200

Discoverer Enterprise is a fifth generation deepwater double hulled dynamically positioned drillship (ASTANO FPSO design) owned and operated by Transocean, capable of operating in moderate environments and water depths up to 3,049 m (10,000 ft) using an 18.75 in (47.6 cm), 15,000 psi blowout preventer (BOP), and a 21 in (53 cm) outside diameter (OD) marine riser. From 1998 to 2005 the vessel was Panama-flagged and currently flies the flag of convenience of the Marshall Islands.

Discoverer Enterprise has two sister ships, Discoverer Spirit completed in 1999, and Discoverer Deep Seas completed in 2000.

The ship was the first to offer a dual drilling derrick capability. The dual derricks allowed simultaneous operations to be performed, and according to Transocean increased efficiency by 40 percent.

The US$360 million ship gives its name to the Enterprise class of large deepwater drillships.

== Deepwater Horizon spill response ==
The ship operates in the Gulf of Mexico under contract to BP. The drilling vessel has equipment that allow it to process hydrocarbons, and is capable of handling up to 15,000 barrels per day (2,400 m^{3}/d). On June 3, 2010, several weeks after the explosion of Deepwater Horizon, Discoverer Enterprise was used to collect oil and gas from the damaged subsea wellhead by lowering a cap connected via a drilling riser over the release, and collecting oil and gas.

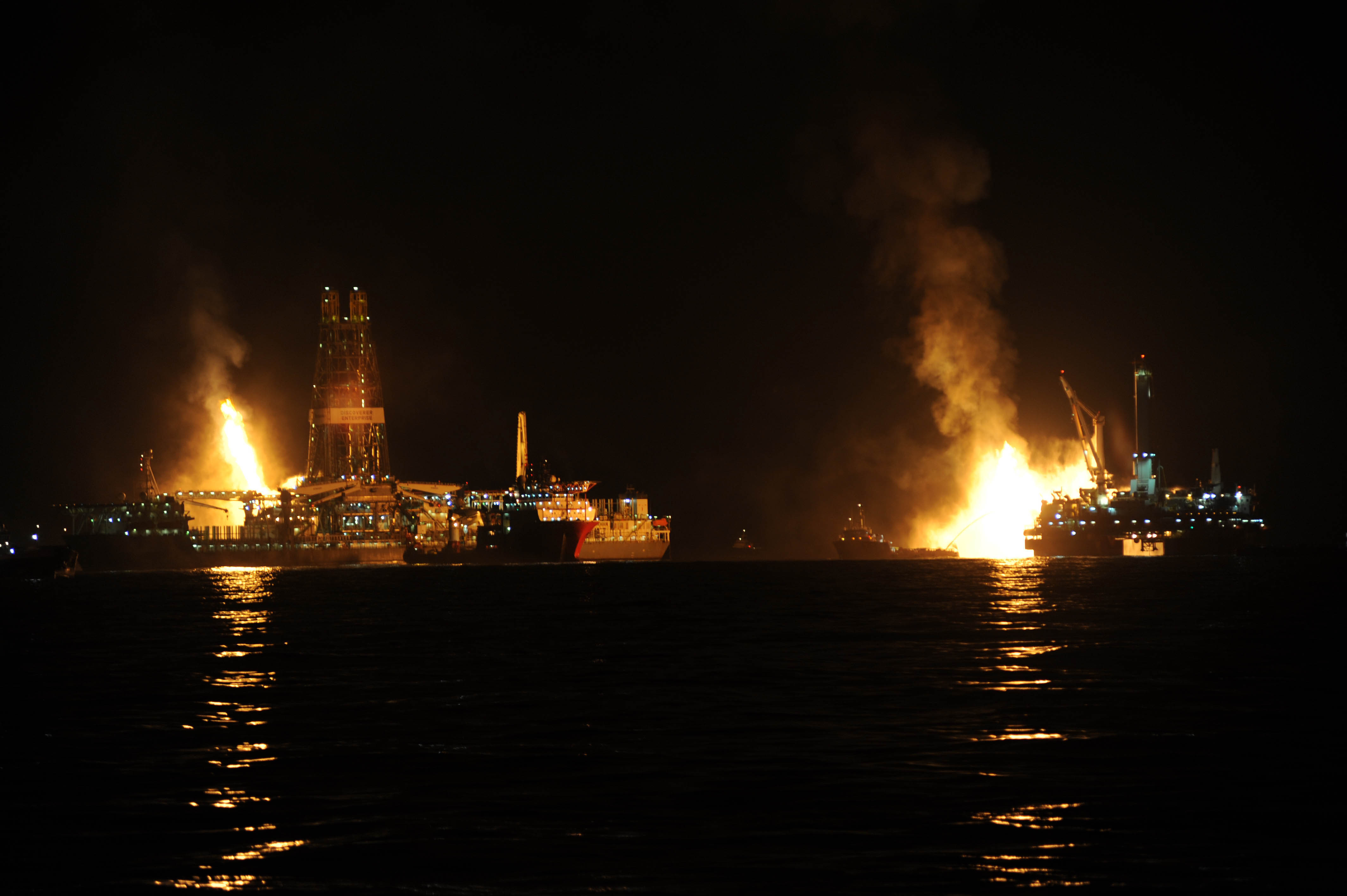
Q4000 and Discoverer Enterprise flare off gas at the site of drilling operations at the Deepwater Horizon response site in the Gulf of Mexico at night 8 July 2010.

== See also ==
- Deepwater Horizon oil spill
- Thunder Horse Oil Field
