= Appaloosa (novel) =

2005 novel by Robert B. Parker

- First edition
- Author: Robert B. Parker
- Language: English
- Series: Everett Hitch series
- Genre: Western
- Publisher: Putnam Adult
- Publication date: June 7, 2005
- Publication place: United States
- Media type: Hardcover
- Pages: 288
- ISBN: 0-399-15277-6
- OCLC: 56686595
- Dewey Decimal: 813/.54 22
- LC Class: PS3566.A686 A863 2005
- Followed by: Resolution

Appaloosa (2005) is a novel set in the American Old West written by Robert B. Parker. A film of the same name based on the novel was released in 2008. Parker published a sequel, Resolution, in June 2008, and a third novel featured the characters of Virgil Cole and Everett Hitch, Brimstone, in May 2009. A fourth book in the series—Blue-Eyed Devil—was published in 2010 shortly before Parker's death. The series has continued since then by author Robert Knott, the latest being book ten, Robert B. Parker's Buckskin, released in April 2020.

== Plot ==
Virgil Cole and Everett Hitch ride into the lawless town of Appaloosa and are instantly seen for what they are, town tamers.
