= Appaloosa (film) =

2008 Western film by Ed Harris

- Theatrical release poster
- Directed by: Ed Harris
- Screenplay by: Robert Knott; Ed Harris
- Based on: Appaloosa by Robert B. Parker
- Produced by: Ed Harris; Robert Knott; Ginger Sledge
- Starring: Viggo Mortensen; Ed Harris; Renée Zellweger; Jeremy Irons; Timothy Spall; Lance Henriksen
- Cinematography: Dean Semler
- Edited by: Kathryn Himoff
- Music by: Jeff Beal
- Production companies: New Line Cinema; Axion Films; Groundswell Productions
- Distributed by: Warner Bros. Pictures
- Release date: September 19, 2008
- Running time: 115 minutes
- Country: United States
- Language: English
- Budget: $20 million
- Box office: $27.7 million

Appaloosa is a 2008 American Western film based on the 2005 novel Appaloosa by crime writer Robert B. Parker. Directed by Ed Harris and co-written by Harris and Robert Knott, Appaloosa stars Harris alongside Viggo Mortensen, Renée Zellweger, and Jeremy Irons. The film premiered at 2008 Toronto International Film Festival and was released in selected cities on September 19, 2008, then expanded into wide release on October 3, 2008. This movie has won four different awards, including the Western Heritage Award in 2009.

== Plot ==
In 1882, the town of Appaloosa, New Mexico, is terrorized by rancher and Englishman Randall Bragg, who kills the town's marshal and his deputies when they attempt to arrest two of Bragg's men for murdering a Chicago businessman and raping and killing his wife. The town's leading citizens hire lawman Virgil Cole and his deputy Everett Hitch to restore order, authorizing Cole to lay down the law as the new marshal of Appaloosa. Cole and Hitch begin by confronting four of Bragg's men causing a disturbance in the saloon, where three of them draw their guns and are killed. The peacekeepers refuse to be intimidated by Bragg, who claims to have connections to President Chester A. Arthur, or his men, and stand firm on enforcing Cole's new rules.

Cole strikes up a romance with Allison "Allie" French, a provocative young widow, and they buy a new house still under construction. She attempts to seduce Hitch when he pays her a visit, and he rebuffs her advances, but is unsure whether to tell Cole, confiding in prostitute Katie. One of Bragg's ranch hands comes forward to confirm he witnessed the murder of the former marshal and deputies, agreeing to testify against him. So, Cole and Hitch sneak onto Bragg's ranch to arrest him, while fending off his gang. A sheriff arrives with a judge for Bragg's trial, as do hired guns Ring and Mackie Shelton, old acquaintances of Cole's. Bragg is found guilty and sentenced to death, while the witness flees Appaloosa on horseback, and Cole and Hitch transport him by train to be hanged. En route, the Shelton brothers appear, holding Allie at gunpoint, having been hired by Bragg to rescue him. They force Cole to hand him over, riding off with Allie as their hostage.

Catching up with the outlaws, Cole and Hitch see Allie frolicking scantily clothed with Ring Shelton. The lawmen force off a band of Chiricahua raiders, giving them Bragg's horse in exchange for safe passage. Allie defends her actions, even accusing Hitch of kissing her first, but Cole's trust in his friend is absolute. Arriving at Beauville, they lock up Bragg with the local sheriff. With advice from Hitch, Cole accepts Allie's promiscuous nature as necessary for her survival. The Sheltons and the sheriff, revealed to be their cousin, free Bragg, and Cole and Hitch are wounded in the ensuing shootout, but kill their attackers as Bragg escapes.

Months pass, and Cole has recovered with a permanent limp, but remains settled down with Allie. Bragg returns to Appaloosa with a full pardon from President Arthur, buying the town hotel where Allie plays piano, and re-establishing himself as a powerful local businessman, though Cole still regards him as a convicted killer. Hitch realizes the town no longer has a place for him as a gunslinger, and that Bragg's own interest in Allie threatens Cole's new life with her. Resigning as deputy, Hitch assaults Bragg and challenges him to a duel, which Bragg reluctantly agrees. Cole tries to intervene, but Hitch remains determined, and as Allie emerges from the hotel behind Bragg, Cole backs away, permitting the gunfight to occur. Bragg raises his gun first, but Hitch shoots him dead on the hotel steps, witnessed by much of the town. Hitch leaves Appaloosa, bidding a silent farewell to Katie and to Cole, hoping his old friend can find happiness with Allie, and rides off into uncertainty.

== Cast ==
- Ed Harris as Virgil Cole
- Viggo Mortensen as Everett Hitch
- Renée Zellweger as Allie French
- Jeremy Irons as Randall Bragg
- Timothy Spall as Phil Olson
- Lance Henriksen as Ring Shelton
- Tom Bower as Abner Raines
- James Gammon as Earl May
- Ariadna Gil as Katie
- Timothy V. Murphy as Vince Sullivan
- Gabriel Marantz as Joe Whittfield
- Bob Harris as Judge Elias Callison
- Luce Rains as Dean
- Rex Linn as Sheriff Clyde Stringer
- Adam Nelson as Mackie Shelton
- Boyd Kestner as Bronc
- Jim Tarwater as Chalk
- Cerris Morgan-Moyer as Tilda
- Erik J. Bockemeier as Fat Wallis
- Daniel T. Parker as Mueller
- Corby Griesenbeck as Deputy Charlie Tewksbury
- Bobby Jauregui as Marshall Jack Bell
- Argos MacCallum as Beauville Sheriff Russell
- Ed Pennybacker as Conductor
- Clark Sanchez as Teamster
- Bounthanh Xaynhachack as Chin
- Agathe Golaszewska as Kid

== Production ==
Appaloosa marks Ed Harris's second outing as director, following the 2000 biopic Pollock, in which he also starred; Harris co-wrote and co-produced Appaloosa with Robert Knott. The budget for Appaloosa was $20 million and filming took place from October 1, 2007, to November 24, 2007, around Albuquerque and Santa Fe, New Mexico, and Austin, Texas. Harris was drawn to Robert B. Parker's bestselling novel because it was constructed like a classic Western, but included crime themes still relevant to contemporary society. He purchased the rights to the novel and hired Parker to adapt his book into a screenplay. Harris, who also stars as Virgil Cole, wanted to make the film in the old-fashioned style of such films as 3:10 to Yuma, My Darling Clementine, and The Man Who Shot Liberty Valance, rather than a revisionist approach. Harris also acknowledged the challenge of making a successful Western movie, saying, "You can count on one hand, or maybe half a hand, the number of Westerns that were box-office successes in the recent past." Production of Appaloosa slowed when New Line Cinema and producers became concerned with the box-office prospects of a Western during a season with such anticipated blockbusters as The Dark Knight. Diane Lane originally signed on to play Allie French, but left the project when the film stalled. The movie got back on track due to the success of the Deadwood series on HBO and the film remake of 3:10 to Yuma. Renée Zellweger was signed to replace Lane.

Harris enjoyed working with Viggo Mortensen in A History of Violence, and had him in mind for the part of Everett Hitch. While publicizing A History of Violence at the Toronto International Film Festival, Harris handed Mortensen a copy of the novel and asked him to read it and consider playing the part. Harris said it was "a totally awkward proposition, handing another actor a book like that," but Mortensen agreed to take the part after responding well to the character and the relationship dynamic between the two characters. Harris said he wanted to make the film because he was drawn to the "unspoken comradeship" of Virgil Cole and Everett Hitch. "Though they've been hanging out for years, they're not too intimate, but they know each other. Aside from in sports, or being a cop, I can't think of any other situation where a friendship like that is called for." Mortensen felt similarly, saying, "I like to ride horses, and I like Westerns, but there are a lot of bad ones. What set this one apart is just how the characters are a little more guarded." Mortensen studied Frederic Remington drawings and other images of the American Old West to get into character and master the proper way to stand during a gunfight.

The DVD includes a number of bonus extra featurettes, including "Dean Semler's Return to the Western," about Appaloosa cinematographer Dean Semler.

== Soundtrack ==
The soundtrack to Appaloosa was released on September 30, 2008.

No.	Title	Artist	Length
1.	"Appaloosa Main Title"	Jeff Beal	2:12
2.	"New City Marshal"	Jeff Beal	1:47
3.	"Bragg's Theme"	Jeff Beal	0:45
4.	"Allison French"	Jeff Beal	1:50
5.	"Allie Teases Virgil"	Jeff Beal	0:40
6.	"Dawn In Appaloosa"	Jeff Beal	1:45
7.	"Cole and Hitch Stalk Bragg"	Jeff Beal	1:22
8.	"Bragg is Captured"	Jeff Beal	3:05
9.	"Apology Accepted"	Jeff Beal	1:27
10.	"The Kiss"	Jeff Beal	2:31
11.	"Readin' and Writin'"	Jeff Beal	1:52
12.	"Allie is Kidnapped"	Jeff Beal	2:52
13.	"Cole Ponders"	Jeff Beal	1:04
14.	"Hitch Rides"	Jeff Beal	1:39
15.	"Finding Allie"	Jeff Beal	1:24
16.	"The Indian Attack"	Jeff Beal	1:39
17.	"The Horse Trade"	Jeff Beal	3:54
18.	"Riding Into Rio Seco"	Jeff Beal	0:47
19.	"Ballad of Rio Seco"	Jeff Beal	2:38
20.	"Shootout at Rio Seco"	Jeff Beal	2:27
21.	"Allie Goes Upstairs"	Jeff Beal	0:57
22.	"Hitch Settles a Score"	Jeff Beal	2:44
23.	"Riding Off, Appaloosa End Credits"	Jeff Beal	3:45
24.	"You'll Never Leave My Heart"	Jeff Beal featuring Ed Harris	4:30
25.	"Ain't Nothin' Like a Friend"	Jeff Beal featuring Donald Rubinstein	3:01
Total length:			52:25

== Reception ==
On Rotten Tomatoes, Appaloosa has an approval rating of 77% based on 162 reviews, with an average rating of 6.7/10. The consensus reads, "A traditional-genre Western, Appaloosa sets itself apart with smart psychology, an intriguing love triangle, and good chemistry between the leads." Metacritic, which uses a weighted average, assigned the film a score of 64 out of 100, based on 32 critics, indicating "generally favorable" reviews.

Early reviews of Appaloosa from the 2008 Toronto International Film Festival were lukewarm. Brad Frenette of the National Post said, "the film feels double its 114-minute running time, but Appaloosa redeems itself through unexpected moments of levity, Harris's steady direction, and the God amongst men, Lance Henriksen." Frenette also said Renee Zellweger is "mostly a bust" and Viggo Mortensen "oozes cool". Popjournalism reviewer Sarah Gopaul said Harris and Mortensen spend too much time talking and discussing their feelings, which she said made the film too light for the gritty Western genre. Gopaul said Harris and Mortensen delivered decent performances and that Renee Zellweger's character has more depth than the traditional romantic interest in a Western. The New Yorker's David Denby called it "a well-made, satisfying, traditionalist Western with some odd quirks and turns."

The film appeared on some critics' top-10 lists of the best films of 2008. Ray Bennett of The Hollywood Reporter named it the eighth-best film of 2008, and Mike Russell of The Oregonian named it the 10th-best film of 2008.

== Trivia ==
Bob Harris, Ed Harris's father, has a small role as Judge Elias Callison.
