= Appaloosa Bones =

Studio album by Gregory Alan Isakov
- Released: August 18, 2023
- Studio: Gregory Alan Isakov's barn (near Boulder, Colorado)
- Length: 37:29
- Labels: Suitcase Town Music; Dualtone Music Group

Gregory Alan Isakov chronology
Evening Machines (2018)	Appaloosa Bones (2023)

Appaloosa Bones is a studio album by Gregory Alan Isakov. It was released on August 18, 2023, by Suitcase Town Music and Dualtone Music Group.

== Background ==
Appaloosa Bones is Isakov's first studio album since Evening Machines (2018). After gaining inspiration from the time he spent in West Texas, Isakov began writing and recording the album at his barn located in Colorado. In an interview with World Cafe, Isakov said of the making of the album: "I thought I was gonna make something very lo-fi, very simple. Almost like a lo-fi rock and roll record. I wanted old silver tones that are double amped and kind of dirty, [...] Then, the songs sort of presented themselves to me. It's sort of a co-creative process for me. I just follow along."

== Promotion ==
On October 17, 2023, Isakov appeared on Minnesota Public Radio's The Current and performed three songs from Appaloosa Bones: "The Fall, "Miles to Go", and "Before the Sun".

== Critical reception ==
Professional ratings
Aggregate scores
Source	Rating
Metacritic	80/100
Review scores
Source	Rating
AllMusic	3.5/5 stars
Mojo	4/5 stars
Paste	7.4/10
PopMatters	8/10
Sputnikmusic	3.8/5 stars

Upon release, Appaloosa Bones received acclaim from music critics. At Metacritic, which assigns a normalized rating out of 100 based on reviews from mainstream publications, the album has a mean weighted average of 80 out of 100 based on six reviews, indicating "generally favorable reviews".

== Track listing ==
Appaloosa Bones track listing
No.	Title	Length
1.	"The Fall"	3:27
2.	"Before the Sun"	2:48
3.	"Appaloosa Bones"	3:59
4.	"Silver Bell"	3:24
5.	"Watchman"	3:18
6.	"Miles to Go"	3:03
7.	"Terlingua"	3:10
8.	"Mistakes"	3:22
9.	"One Day"	2:41
10.	"Sweet Heat Lightning"	4:46
11.	"Feed Your Horses"	3:31
Total length:		37:29

== Charts ==
Chart performance for Appaloosa Bones
Chart (2023–2024)	Peak position
Australian Vinyl Albums (ARIA)	6
US Billboard 200	81
