= Mike Russell (author) =

American writer and cartoonist

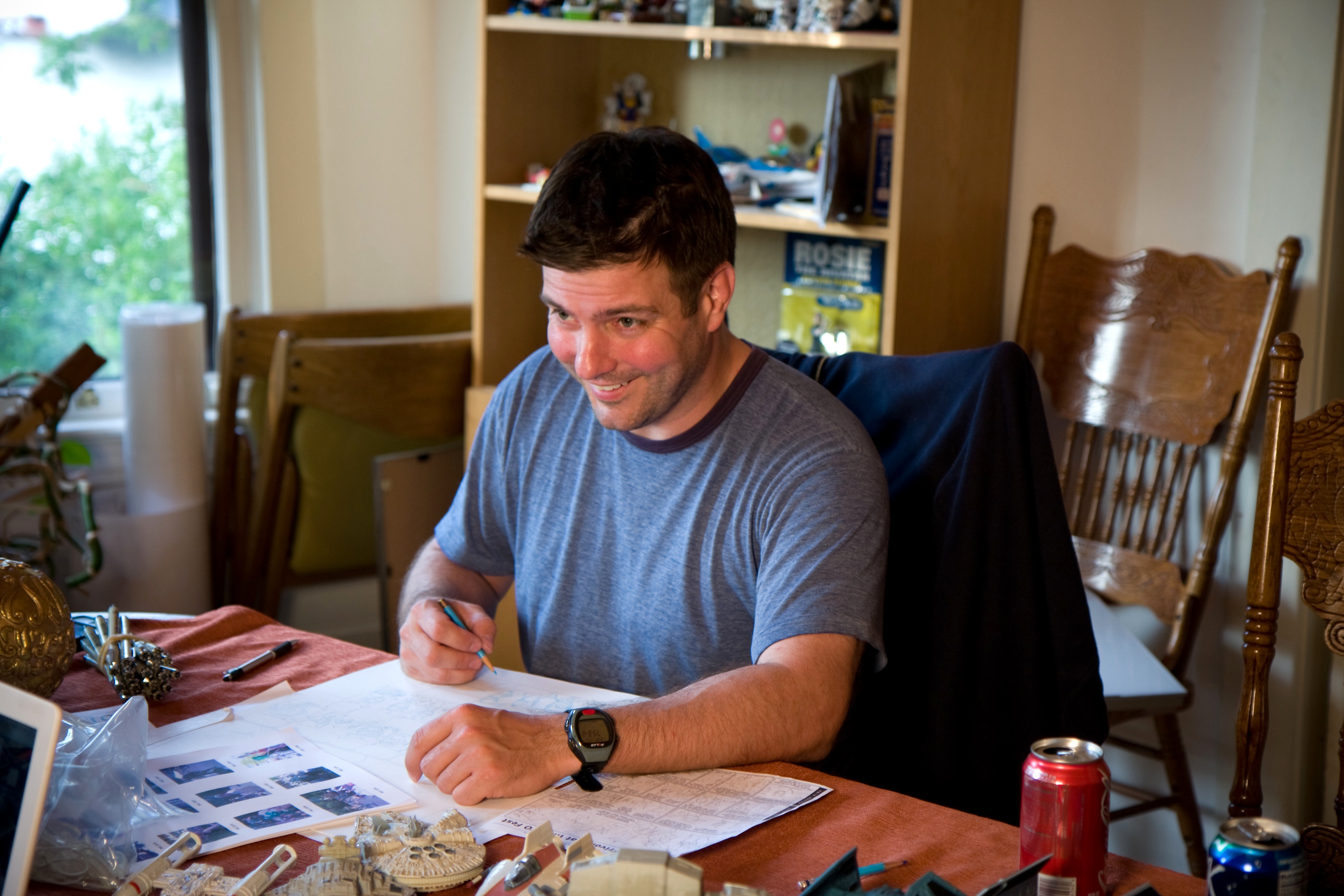
Mike Russell in 2009

Mike Russell is a writer and cartoonist who currently lives in Portland, Oregon. His best known work, CulturePulp appeared regularly in The Oregonian. In addition to writing articles for the publication, his work has appeared nationally in a variety of mediums including: comic books, newspapers, posters, college lectures and magazines.

== Career ==
Russell is a graduate of the University of Oregon where he worked for The Oregon Voice, a campus publication. He majored in Magazine Journalism and later began a career in media at The Clackamas Review, a Pamplin Media Group community paper in Milwaukie, Oregon. In early 2004, he joined The Oregonian as a freelancer. The first CulturePulp strip appeared in the paper in March 2004, followed by another series titled "Mr. Do and Mr. Don't." Since then, he has contributed articles and comics to Willamette Week, The Boston Globe and The Wall Street Journal.

In addition to his work as a cartoonist, Russell penned movie and book reviews, celebrity interviews and other articles for The Oregonian.

Russell is also the author of the Star Wars comic Jaxon's 11 and edits Serenity Tales, a collection of comics that focuses on the popular cult science fiction program Firefly. In 2004, Russell created a poster for the Timbers Army, a fan club that follows the Portland Timbers, a Major League Soccer team in Portland.

In December 2010, he released Cort and Fatboy and the Secret of the Buried Unicorns, an illustrated adventure starring Cort Webber and Bobby Roberts, the hosts of Cort and Fatboy, a former radio show in Portland. Russell regularly appeared on the show as a weekly co-host beginning in 2006.

In early 2011, Russell created The Sabertooth Vampire. The comic strips were later assembled into a print collection. A follow-up, titled The Sabertooth Vampire Unleashed, was released in October 2011. Over the course of 2012, several issues of Dark Horse Presents included Sabertooth Vampire comics, one of which featured an encounter between the titular character and Hellboy, the popular comic book hero.

== Personal life ==
Russell was adopted as a child and wrote about his experiences for a presentation/essay titled "The Bastard Spawn Speaks."
