= Blue-Eyed Devil =

2009 novel by Robert B. Parke

- Author: Robert B. Parker
- Language: English
- Series: Everett Hitch series
- Genre: Western
- Publication date: 2009
- Publication place: United States
- Media type: Hardcover, paperback, ebook
- Preceded by: Brimstone

Blue-Eyed Devil (2009) is a novel set in the American Old West written by American crime writer Robert B. Parker. It is the fourth novel that features the characters Virgil Cole and Everett Hitch.

The audiobook, released in May 2010, is narrated by American actor Titus Welliver.

== Plot ==
Appaloosa town law enforcement was once Virgil Cole and Everett Hitch. Now the chief is Amos Callico, a power-hungry man who want to have Cole and Hitch on his side. But Cole and Hitch can't be bought, and they can be more of a challenge for Callico in face of his dream.

== Critical reception ==
Blue-Eyed Devil received a starred review from Booklist. Publishers Weekly referred to it as an "excellent posthumous western" that is "lean, fast, and full of snappy dialogue". According to Kirkus Reviews, the novel contains "more shifting allegiances, moral dilemmas and characters capable of change than Virgil and Everett's fans may be used to. It's a shame that this youngest of the late Parker's franchises has to end so soon."
