= GlobalSantaFe Corporation =

Former offshore drilling contractor headquartered in Houston, Texas

- Industry: Petroleum industry
- Founded: November 20, 2001; 24 years ago
- Defunct: November 27, 2007; 18 years ago
- Fate: Acquired by Transocean
- Headquarters: Houston, Texas
- Key people: Jon A. Marshall, CEO; Michael R. Dawson, CFO
- Services: Offshore drilling
- Revenue: ▲$3.312 billion (2006)
- Net income: ▲$1.006 billion (2006)
- Total assets: ▼$6.220 billion (2006)
- Total equity: ▼$4.847 billion (2006)

GlobalSantaFe Corporation was an offshore drilling contractor headquartered in Houston, Texas. It owned 59 marine drilling rigs. In November 2007, the company was acquired by Transocean.

== History ==
The company was formed in 2001 by the merger of Global Marine and Santa Fe International Corporation.

In March 2003, the company temporarily suspended operations in Kuwait ahead of the Iraq War.

In May 2004, the company sold its worldwide land drilling assets to Precision Drilling for $316.5 million.

In August 2004, one of the company's rigs sank in the Mediterranean Sea about 25 miles offshore Egypt after a fire broke out on the rig.

In June 2006, the company contracted with Saudi Aramco for 4 of its jackup rigs.

In November 2007, the company merged with Transocean.
