= Gregory Alan Isakov =

South African musician (born 1979)

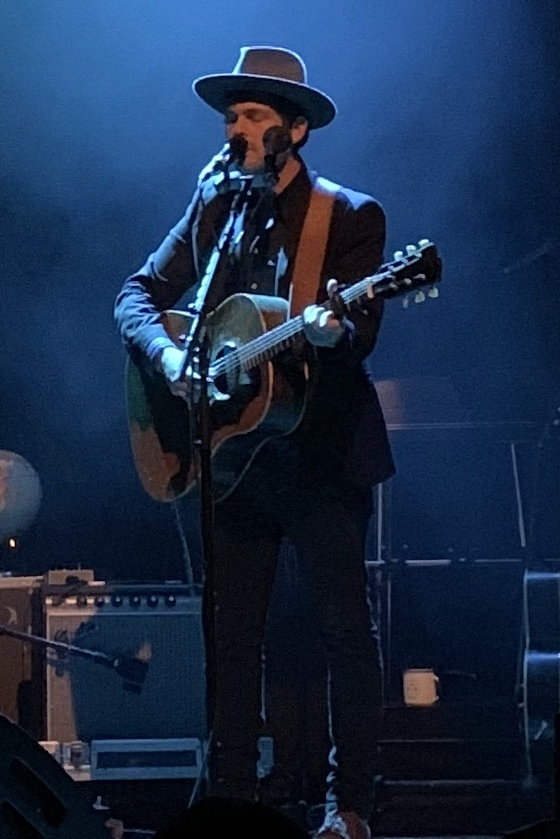
- Isakov performing in 2019

Background information
- Born: October 19, 1979 (age 47); Johannesburg, Transvaal, South Africa
- Origin: Philadelphia, Pennsylvania, U.S.
- Genres: Contemporary folk; indie folk; country folk
- Occupations: Musician; singer; farmer
- Years active: 2003–present
- Website: gregoryalanisakov.com

Gregory Alan Isakov (born October 19, 1979) is a South African musician currently based in Boulder, Colorado. Isakov and his family immigrated to the United States in 1986 and he was raised in Philadelphia.

Isakov's music combines indie and folk, featuring instruments such as the guitar and banjo. He is widely known for the songs "Words," "The Stable Song," "Big Black Car," "If I Go, I'm Goin' " and "San Luis." Isakov has released seven albums. His most recent album, Appaloosa Bones, was released on August 18, 2023.

== Life and career ==
Isakov's grandfather was a Lithuanian Jew who fled to South Africa during World War II. Isakov was born in Johannesburg on October 19, 1979. He immigrated with his family to the United States in 1986 because his father Nissen started an electronic engineering business in Philadelphia.

In Philadelphia, he began touring with a band at the age of 16. Isakov later moved to Colorado to study horticulture at Naropa University. Isakov had played instruments his whole life, but began a life as a professional musician playing occasional gigs while also working as a gardener. His musical career became more serious when he began touring with Kelly Joe Phelps.

In 2003, Isakov self-released his first album Rust Colored Stones. In 2005, he self-released Songs for October. In 2007, he self-released That Sea, the Gambler. Later that year, he was named Best Male Songwriter by Colorado magazine Westword. In 2009, Isakov self-released This Empty Northern Hemisphere which featured vocals by Brandi Carlile on five tracks and a cover of Leonard Cohen's "One of Us Cannot Be Wrong". In 2013, Isakov created his independent label Suitcase Town Music on which he released The Weatherman.

In 2016, Isakov released Gregory Alan Isakov with the Colorado Symphony, an album of eleven of his earlier songs orchestrated by several composers and recorded with the full Colorado Symphony. On October 5, 2018, he released Evening Machines on his Suitcase Town Music label.

Isakov has been influenced by the music of Leonard Cohen, Gillian Welch, Kelly Joe Phelps, Iron & Wine and Bruce Springsteen.

Acclaimed for his lyrics, his music often explores themes such as nature, introspection, and personal experiences within the folk and indie genres. He has played at many music festivals around the United States, Canada and Europe. At these music festivals, Isakov has shared the stage with numerous touring artists such as Rodrigo y Gabriela, Alexi Murdoch and Fiona Apple.

In November 2019, Isakov's album Evening Machines was nominated for the Grammy Award for Best Folk Album in the 62nd Annual Grammy Awards.

The song "Big Black Car" from the 2009 album This Empty Northern Hemisphere was featured in a 2012 McDonald's commercial. Isakov donated the proceeds to non-profit organizations that help further sustainable farming and nurture community.

While simultaneously maintaining his music career throughout the years, Isakov has been the owner and operator of Starling Farm in Boulder County, Colorado since its purchase in 2014. Described as "a six-acre farm focused on small-scale, bio-intensive market gardening", Starling Farms not only supplies fresh produce to local chefs, it hosts Isakov's personal recording studio where he recorded his 2023 album Appaloosa Bones.

== Discography ==
- Rust Colored Stones (2003)
- Songs for October (2005)
- That Sea, the Gambler (2007)
- This Empty Northern Hemisphere (2009)
- The Weatherman (2013)
- Gregory Alan Isakov with the Colorado Symphony (2016)
- Evening Machines (2018)
- Appaloosa Bones (2023) – No. 81 US Billboard 200
