= Drillship =

Vessel fitted for offshore drilling

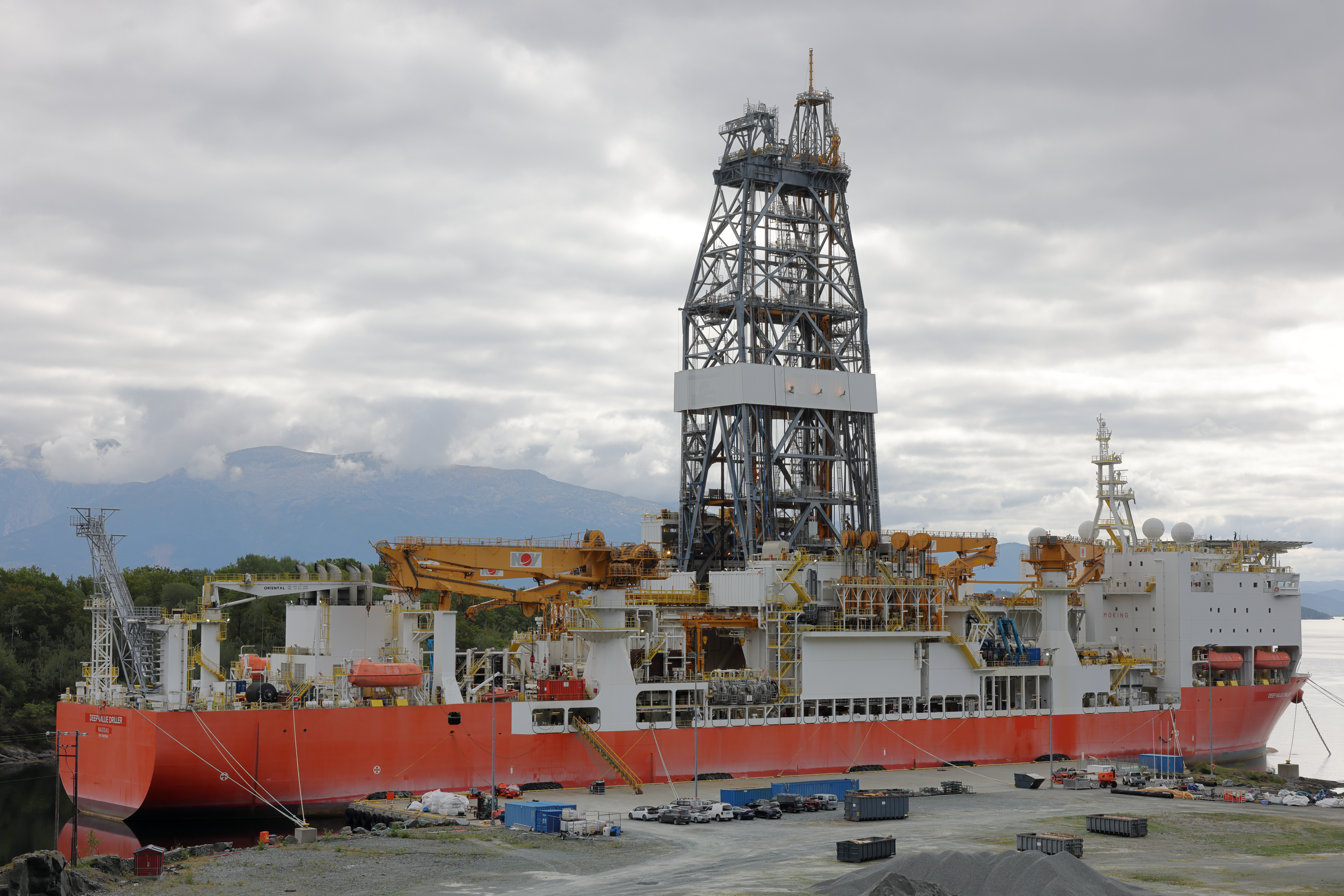
Drillship Deep Value Driller docked in Norway

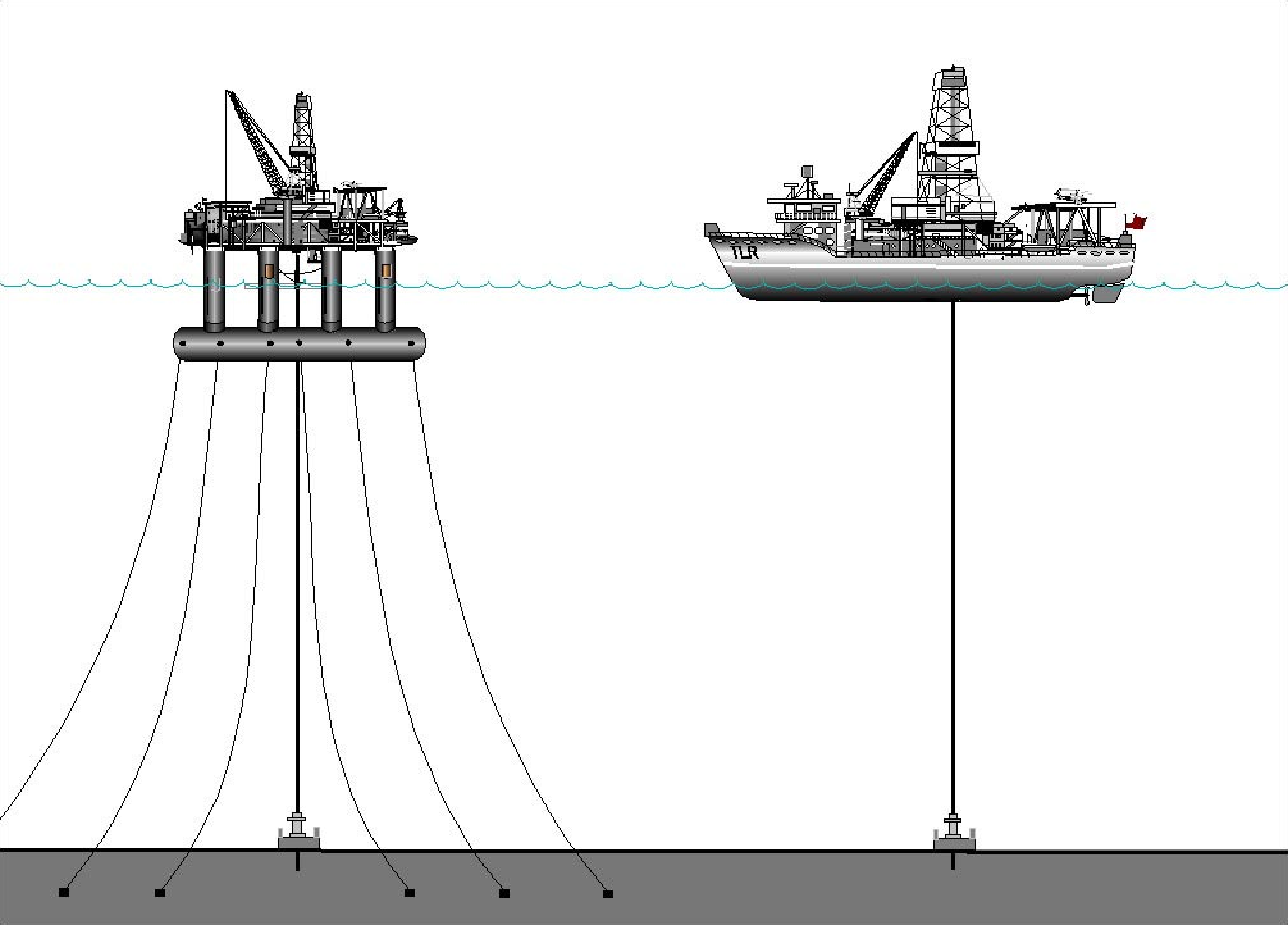
Comparison of deepwater semi-submersible and drillship.

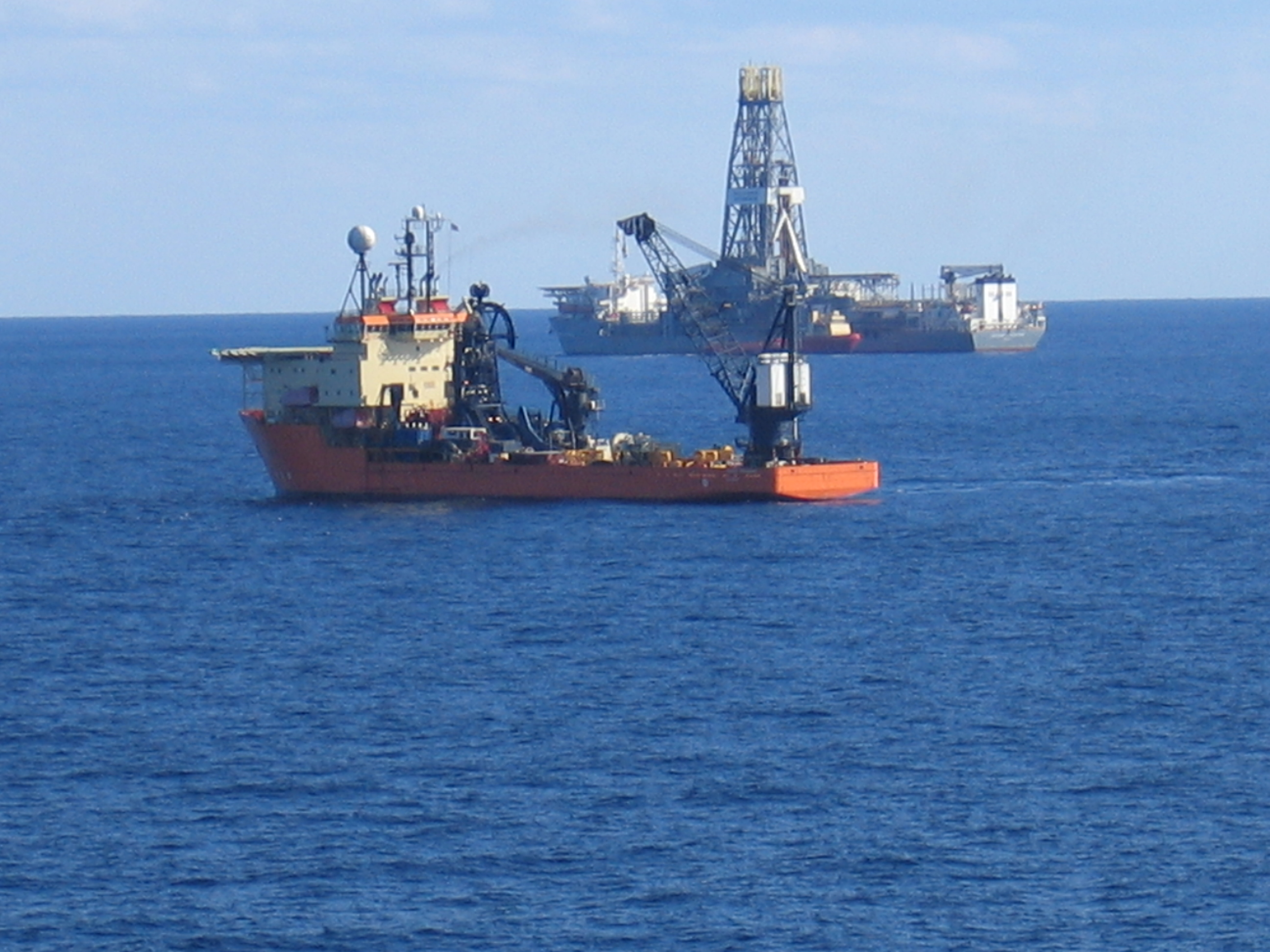
In the foreground, offshore support vessel Toisa Perseus with the fifth-generation deepwater drillship Discoverer Enterprise.

A drillship is a merchant vessel designed for use in exploratory offshore drilling of new oil and gas wells or for scientific drilling purposes. In recent years the vessels have been used in deepwater and ultra-deepwater applications, equipped with the latest and most advanced dynamic positioning systems.

== History ==
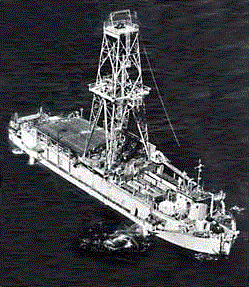
Drillship CUSS I.

The first drillship was the CUSS I, designed by Robert F. Bauer of Global Marine in 1955. The CUSS I had drilled in 400-foot-deep waters by 1957. Robert F. Bauer became the first president of Global Marine in 1958.

In 1961 Global Marine started a new drillship era. They ordered several self-propelled drillships each with a rated centerline drilling of 20,000 foot-wells in water depths of 600 feet. The first was named CUSS (Glomar) II, a 5,500-deadweight-ton vessel, costing around $4.5 million. Built by a Gulf Coast shipyard, the vessel was almost twice the size of the CUSS I, and became the world's first drillship built as a new construction which set sail in 1962.

In 1962, The Offshore Company elected to build a new type of drillship, larger than that of the Glomar class. This new drillship would feature a first-ever anchor mooring array based on a unique turret system. The vessel was named Discoverer I. The Discoverer I had no main propulsion engines, meaning it needed to be towed out to the drill site.

== Application ==
A drillship can be used as a platform to carry out well maintenance or completion work such as casing and tubing installation, subsea tree installations, and well capping. Drillships are often built to the design specifications set by the oil production company or investors.

From the first drillship CUSS I to the Deepwater Asgard, the fleet size has been growing ever since. In 2013 the worldwide fleet of drillships topped 80 ships, more than double its size in 2009. Drillships are not only growing in size but also in capability, with new technology assisting operations from academic research to ice-breaker class drilling vessels. U.S. President Barack Obama's decision in late March 2010 to expand U.S. domestic exploratory drilling seemed likely to increase further developments of drillship technology.

== Design ==
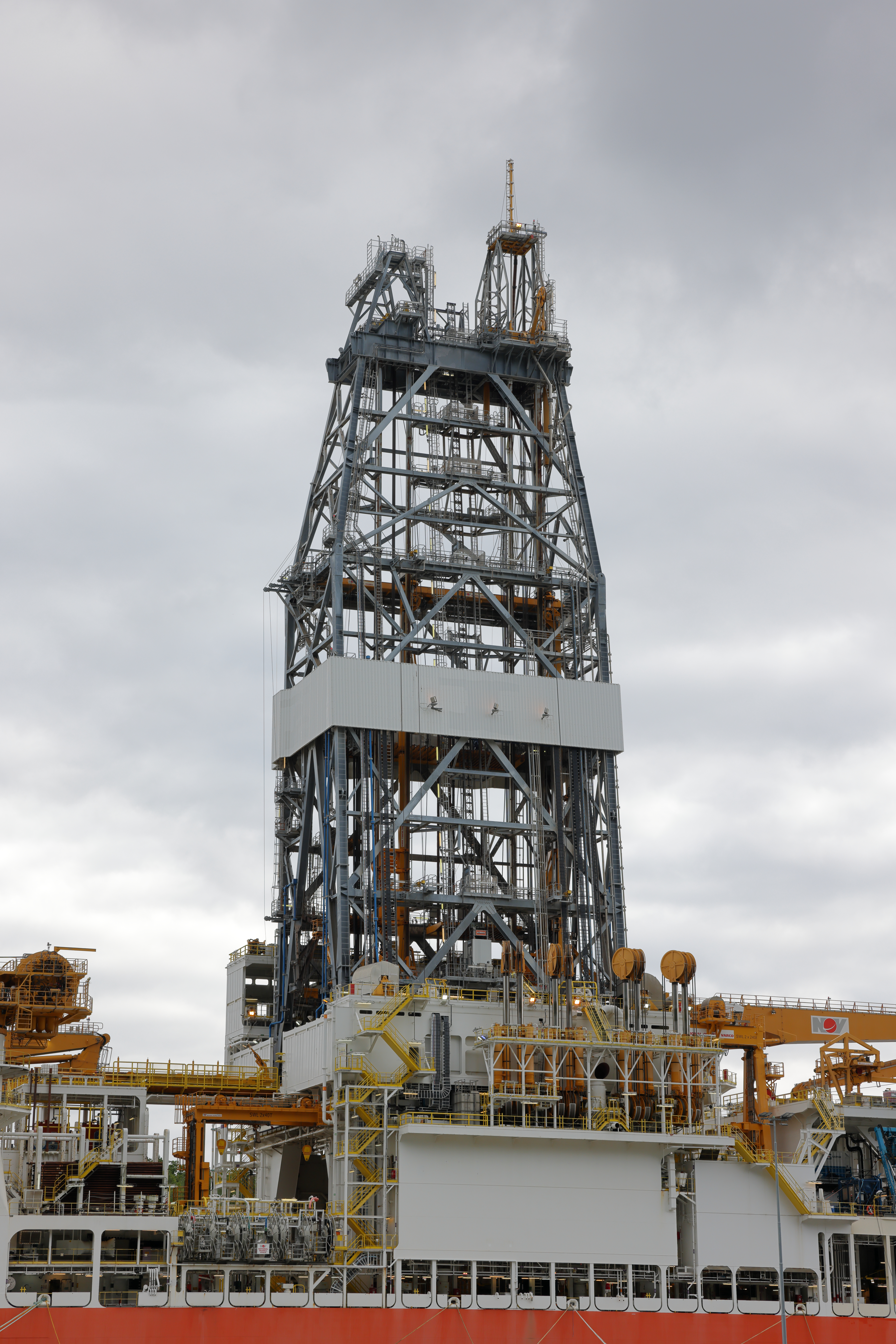
Tower of drillship Deep Value Driller

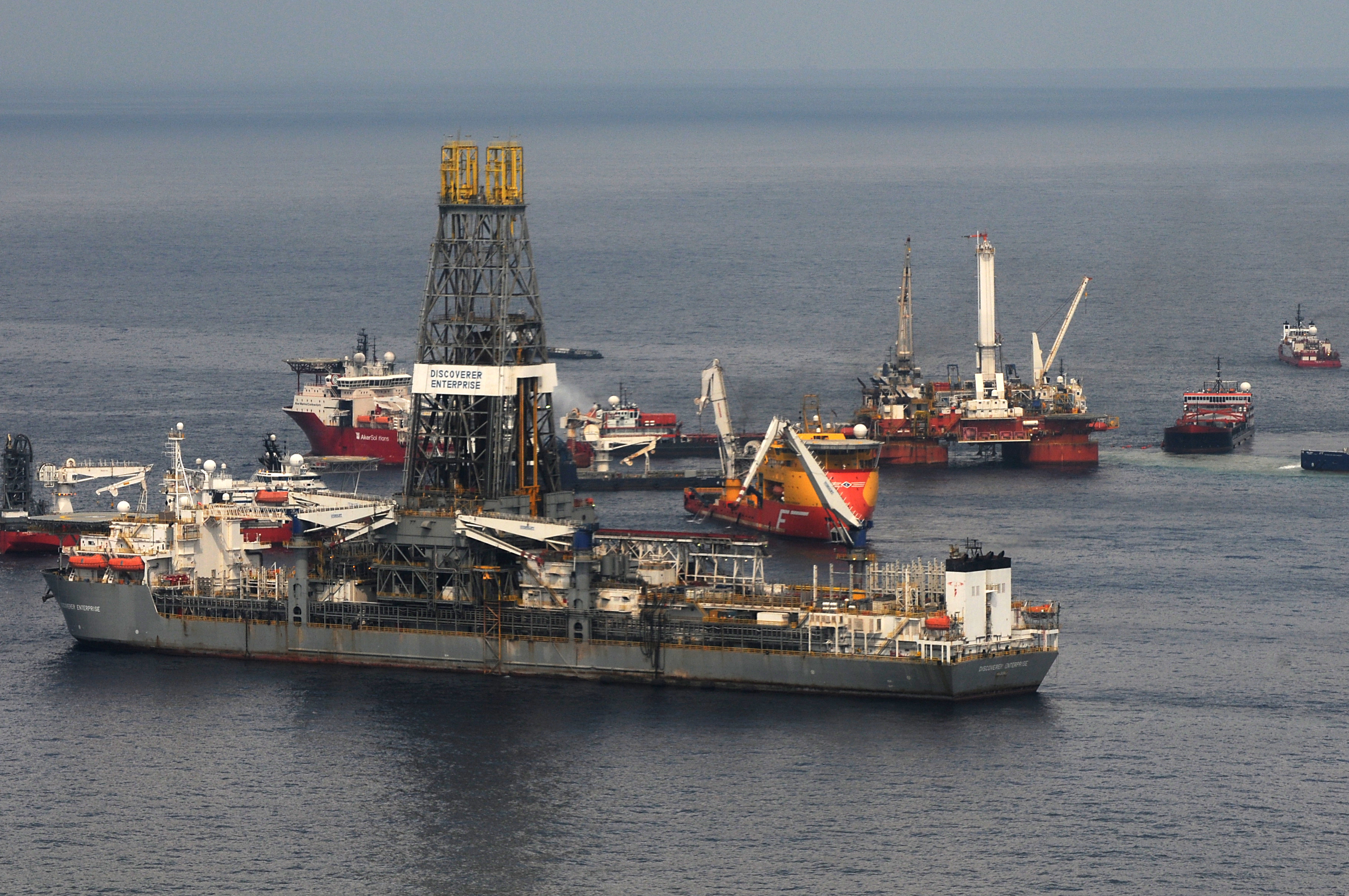
Drillship Discoverer Enterprise.

Drillships are just one way to perform various types of drilling. This function can also be performed by semi-submersibles, jackups, barges, or platform rigs.

Drillships have the functional ability of semi-submersible drilling rigs and also have a few unique features that separate them from all others, first being the ship-shaped design. A drillship has greater mobility and can move quickly under its own propulsion from drill site to drill site in contrast to semi-submersibles and jackup barges and platforms. Drillships have the ability to save time sailing between oilfields worldwide. A drillship takes 20 days to move from the Gulf of Mexico to offshore Angola, whereas a semi-submersible drilling unit must be towed and takes 70 days. Drillship construction costs are much higher than that of a semi-submersible. Although mobility comes at a high price, the drillship owners can charge higher day rates and get the benefit of lower idle times between assignments.

The table below depicts the industry's way of classifying drill sites into different vintages, depending on their age and water depth.

Drillship	Launch Date	Water Depth (ft.)
CUSS I	1961	350
Discoverer 534	1975	7,000
Enterprise	1999	10,000
Inspiration	2009	12,000

The drilling operations are very detailed and in-depth. A simple way to understand what a drillship does to drill, is that a marine riser is lowered from the drillship to the seabed with a blowout preventer (BOP) at the bottom that connects to the wellhead. The BOP is used to quickly disconnect the riser from the wellhead in times of emergency or in any needed situation. Underneath the derrick is a moonpool, an opening through the hull covered by the rig floor. Some of the modern drillships have larger derricks that allow dual activity operations, for example, simultaneous drilling and casing handling.

== Types ==
There are different types of offshore drilling units such as the oil platform, jackup rig, submersible drilling rig, semi-submersible platform and of course drillships. All drillships have what is called a ”moon pool”. The moon pool is an opening on the base of the hull and depending on the mission the vessel is on, drilling equipment, small submersible crafts and divers may pass through the moon pool. Since the drillship is also a vessel, it can easily relocate to any desired location. Due to their mobility, drillships are not as stable compared to semi-submersible platforms. To maintain its position, drillships may utilize their anchors or use the ship's computer-controlled system on board to run off its dynamic positioning.

=== Chikyū ===
One of the world's best-known drillships is Japan's ocean-going drilling vessel Chikyū, which actually is a research vessel. The Chikyū has the remarkable ability to drill to a depth of 7.0 kilometres (23,000 ft) below the seabed, bringing that to two to four times that of any other drillship.

=== Dhirubhai Deepwater KG1 ===
In 2011 the Transocean drillship Dhirubhai Deepwater KG1 set the world water-depth record at 10,194 feet of water (3,107 meters) while working for Reliance – LWD and directional drilling done by Sperry Drilling in India.

== Drillship operators ==
- Diamond Offshore Drilling
- International Ocean Discovery Program
- Noble Corporation
- Odfjell Drilling
- Seadrill
- Transocean
- Türkiye Petrolleri Anonim Ortaklığı (TPAO)
- Valaris Limited
- Foresea
