= Dynamic positioning =

Automatic ship station- and heading-holding systems

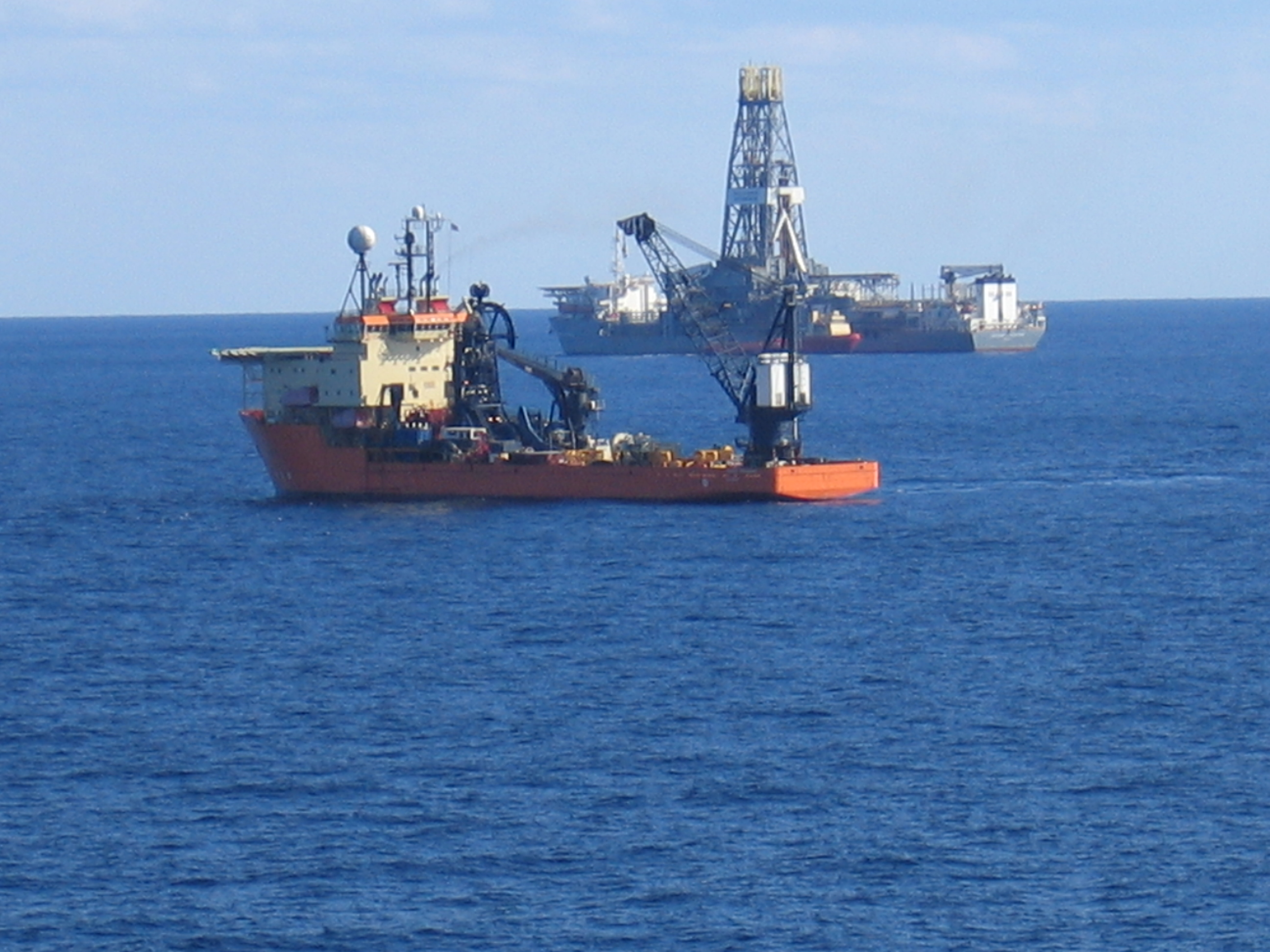
Offshore support vessel Toisa Perseus with, in the background, the fifth-generation deepwater drillship Discoverer Enterprise, over the Thunder Horse Oil Field. Both are equipped with DP systems.

Dynamic positioning (DP) is a computer-controlled system which automatically maintains a vessel's position and heading by using its own propellers and thrusters. Position references sensors, combined with wind sensors, motion sensors, and gyrocompasses, provides the computer with information about the vessel's position and the magnitude and direction of the environmental forces affecting it. Examples of vessel types that employ DP include ships and semi-submersible mobile offshore drilling units (MODU), oceanographic research vessels, cable layer ships, and cruise ships.

The computer program contains a mathematical model of the vessel, including information such as its current drag and thrusters' locations. This knowledge, combined with sensor data (e.g. wind), allows the computer to calculate the required steering angle and the output for each thruster to support operations at sea where mooring or anchoring is not feasible due to deep water, seabed congestion (pipelines, templates), or other constraints.

Dynamic positioning may be either absolute, in that the position is locked to a fixed point on the bottom, or relative to a moving object, such as another ship or an underwater vehicle. One may also position the ship at a favourable angle to the wind, waves, and current, a practice called Weathervaning.

Dynamic positioning is used by much of the offshore oil industry, for example, in the North Sea, Persian Gulf, Gulf of Mexico, West Africa, and off the coast of Brazil.

== History ==
Dynamic positioning began in the 1960s for offshore drilling. With drilling moving into ever deeper waters, jack-up barges could not be used anymore, and anchoring in deep water was not economical.

As part of Project Mohole, in 1961, the drillship CUSS 1 was fitted with four steerable propellers. The Mohole project aimed to drill to the Moho, which required a solution for deep-water drilling. It was possible to keep the ship in position above a well off La Jolla, California, at a depth of 948 meters.

After this, off the coast of Guadalupe, Mexico, five holes were drilled, the deepest at 183 m (600 ft) below the sea floor in 3,500 m (11,500 ft) of water, while maintaining a position within a radius of 180 metres (590 ft). The ship's position was determined by radar ranging to buoys and sonar ranging from subsea beacons.

Whereas the CUSS 1 was kept in position manually, Shell later in the same year launched the drilling ship Eureka, which had an analog control system interfaced with a taut wire, making it the first true DP ship.

While the first DP ships had analog controllers and lacked redundancy, vast improvements have been made since then. DP is now used not only in the oil industry but also on various other types of ships. In addition, DP is no longer limited to maintaining a fixed position. One use case is sailing an exact track, which is useful for cablelay, pipelay, survey, and other tasks.

== Comparison between position-keeping options ==
Other methods of position-keeping include using an anchor spread and a jack-up barge. All have their own advantages and disadvantages.

Comparison of position-keeping options
	Jack-up barge	Anchoring	Dynamic positioning
Advantages	No complex systems with thrusters, extra generators, and controllers.; No chance of running off position due to system failures or blackouts.; No underwater hazards from thrusters.	No complex systems with thrusters, extra generators, and controllers.; No chance of running off position due to system failures or blackouts.; No underwater hazards from thrusters.	Maneuverability is excellent; it is easy to change position.; No anchor handling tugs are required.; Not dependent on water depth.; Quick setup.; Not limited by an obstructed seabed.
Disadvantages	No maneuverability once positioned.; Limited to water depths of 175 meters.	Limited maneuverability once anchored.; Anchor handling tugs are required.; Less suitable in deep water.; Time to anchor out varies from several hours to several days.; Limited by obstructed seabed (pipelines, seabed).	Complex systems with thrusters, extra generators, and controllers.; High initial costs of installation.; High fuel costs.; Chance of running off position in case of strong currents or winds, or due to system failures or blackouts.; Underwater hazards from thrusters for divers and ROVs.; Higher maintenance of the mechanical systems.

Although all methods have their own advantages, dynamic positioning has enabled many operations that were previously infeasible.

The costs are falling due to newer, cheaper technologies, and the advantages are becoming more compelling as offshore work moves into ever-deeper water and the underwater environment (coral) is given greater respect. In container operations, crowded ports can be made more efficient through faster, more accurate berthing techniques. Cruise ship operations benefit from faster berthing and non-anchored "moorings" off beaches or inaccessible ports.

== Applications ==
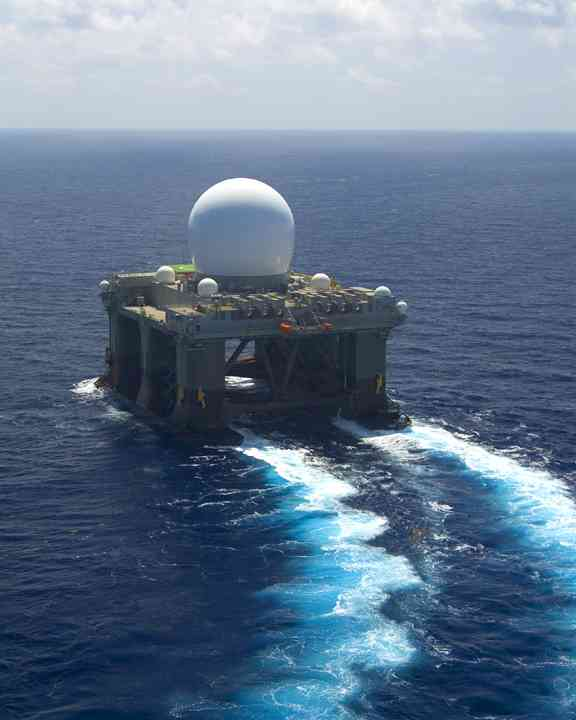
SBX underway

Important applications include:

- Servicing aids to navigation (ATON)
- Cable-laying
- Crane vessels
- Cruise ships
- Deep sea mining
- Diving support vessels
- Dredging
- Drillships
- Floating production storage and offloading units (FPSOs)
- Flotels
- Landing platform docks
- Maritime research
- Mine sweepers
- Pipe-laying ship
- Platform supply vessels
- Rock dumping
- Sea Launch
- Sea-based X-band radar
- Shuttle tankers
- Survey ships

== Scope ==
A ship's motion can be described in terms of six degrees of freedom, consisting of translation and rotation along three perpendicular axes.

The three translational motions are:

- Surge: movement along the longitudinal axis (forward/astern)
- Sway: movement along the lateral axis (starboard/port)
- Heave: movement along the vertical axis (up/down)

The three rotational motions are:

- Roll: rotation about the longitudinal axis
- Pitch: rotation about the lateral axis
- Yaw: rotation about the vertical axis

Dynamic positioning is primarily concerned with controlling a vessel in the horizontal plane, namely translation along the two horizontal axes (surge and sway) and rotation about the vertical axis (yaw).

== Requirements ==
For a vessel to operate using dynamic positioning (DP), several essential components are required:

- Position and heading information: Accurate information about the vessel's position and heading is fundamental to DP operation.
- Control system: A dedicated computer system continuously calculates the corrective actions required to maintain the vessel's position and heading.
- Thrust elements: Propellers and thrusters generate the forces required by the control system to counteract environmental forces.

When designing a DP vessel, careful consideration must be given to both the position reference systems and the available thrust. In particular, maintaining position and heading in adverse weather requires sufficient thrust capacity in all three controlled degrees of freedom: surge, sway, and yaw.

Maintaining a fixed position is especially challenging in polar conditions, where ice forces can change rapidly. Current ship-borne ice detection and mitigation technologies are not yet advanced enough to predict these forces reliably, though they may offer advantages over sensors deployed by helicopter.

== Positioning systems ==
There are several methods for determining a ship's position at sea. Most traditional methods of ship navigation are not accurate enough to meet some modern requirements. For that reason, several positioning systems have been developed during the past decades. Producers of DP systems are: Marine Technologies LLC, Kongsberg Maritime, Navis Engineering Oy, GE, SIREHNA, Wärtsilä (ex L-3), Edison Chouest Offshore, Rolls-Royce plc, Praxis Automation Technology, Brunvoll AS. The term digital anchor has been used to describe such dynamic positioning systems. The applications and availability depends on the type of work and water depth. The most common position reference systems (PRS) and position measuring systems (PME) are:

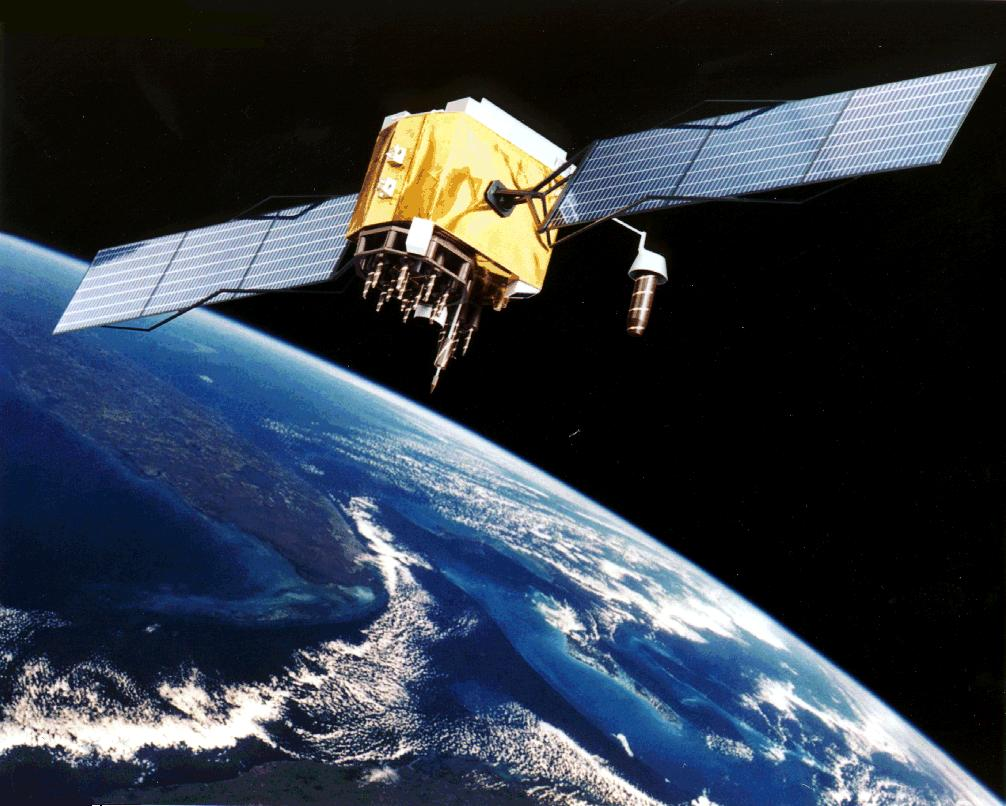
GPS satellite in orbit

- DGPS, Differential GPS. The GPS position is not accurate enough for DP use. The position is improved by using a fixed ground-based reference station (differential station) that compares the GPS position to the station's known position. The correction is sent to the DGPS receiver by long-wave radio frequency. For use in DP, an even higher accuracy and reliability are needed. Companies such as Veripos, Fugro, or C-Nav supply differential signals via satellite, enabling the combination of several differential stations. The advantage of DGPS is that it is almost always available. Disadvantages include signal degradation due to ionospheric or atmospheric disturbances, satellite blockage from cranes or other structures, and signal degradation at high altitudes. There are also systems installed on vessels that use various augmentation systems, as well as combining GPS position with GLONASS.
- Acoustics. This system consists of one or more transponders placed on the seabed and a transducer placed in the ship's hull. The transducer sends an acoustic signal (by means of piezoelectric elements) to the transponder, which is triggered to reply. As the velocity of sound through water is known (preferably, a sound profile is taken regularly), the distance is known. Because there are many elements on the transducer, the direction of the signal from the transponder can be determined. Now, the ship's position relative to the transponder can be calculated. A disadvantage is vulnerability to noise from thrusters or other acoustic systems. Use is limited in shallow waters because of refraction that occurs when sound travels horizontally through water. Three types of HPR systems are commonly used:
  - Ultra- or super- short base line, USBL or SSBL. This works as described above. Because the angle to the transponder is measured, a correction must be applied for the ship's roll and pitch. Motion Reference Units determine these. Because of the nature of angle measurement, accuracy deteriorates as water depth increases.
  - Long baseline (LBL): This system consists of an array of at least three transponders. Their initial positions are determined using USBL and/or by measuring the baselines between them. Once these positions are established, only the ranges to the transponders need to be measured to determine the vessel's relative position. In theory, the position lies at the intersection of imaginary spheres centred on each transponder, with each sphere's radius determined by the signal travel time multiplied by the speed of sound in water. Because angular measurements are not required, LBL generally provides better accuracy than USBL in deep water.
  - Short baseline (SBL): This system uses an array of transducers mounted in the vessel's hull. The transducers determine their position relative to a transponder, allowing the vessel's position to be calculated in a manner similar to LBL. Because the array is mounted on the vessel, the measurements must be corrected for roll and pitch.
- Riser Angle Monitoring. On drillships, riser angle monitoring can be fed into the DP system. It may be an electrical inclinometer or a USBL-based system, in which a riser-angle monitoring transponder is fitted to the riser, and a remote inclinometer unit is installed on the Blow Out Preventer (BOP) and interrogated via the ship's HPR.
- Light taut wire (LTW or LWTW): One of the oldest position reference systems used for DP, the light taut wire remains accurate in relatively shallow water. A clump weight is lowered to the seabed, and the vessel's relative position is calculated by measuring the length of wire paid out and its angle using a gimbal-mounted sensor. The wire angle must be kept within appropriate limits to prevent the clump weight from being dragged along the seabed. In deeper water, currents can cause the wire to curve, reducing accuracy, although some systems compensate for this by using a gimbal mechanism at the clump weight. Horizontal LTW systems may also be used when operating close to a structure, where falling objects can pose a risk to the wire.
- Fanbeam and CyScan: These are laser-based position reference systems that measure range and bearing to reflective targets installed on a nearby structure or vessel. One limitation is the possibility of the system detecting unintended reflective objects or losing sight of the intended target. CyScan Absolute Signature, introduced in 2017, was designed to improve target identification by establishing an active lock on compatible Absolute Signature targets. Its operating range varies with environmental conditions and system configuration. More recent laser-based position reference systems can operate without dedicated reflective targets by scanning surrounding structures and using simultaneous localization and mapping (SLAM) techniques to determine relative vessel movement. Guidance Marine introduced SceneScan, a targetless two-dimensional laser position reference system, in 2018. Furlong Sensing has subsequently developed Unity, a targetless three-dimensional lidar-based local position reference system. Targetless systems are particularly applicable to operations such as offshore wind-farm support, where installing and maintaining reflective targets on numerous structures may be impractical.
- Artemis. A radar-based system. A unit is placed on a fixed station (FPSO), and the unit on board the mobile station locks onto it to report the range and bearing. The operational range exceeds 4 kilometers. The advantage is the reliable, all-weather performance. The disadvantage is that the unit is rather heavy and costly. Current version is the Artemis Mk6.
- DARPS, Differential, Absolute and Relative Positioning System. Commonly used on shuttle tankers while loading from a FPSO. Both will have a GPS receiver. Since the errors are the same for both, the signal does not need to be corrected. The position from the FPSO is transmitted to the shuttle tanker, so a range and bearing can be calculated and fed into the DP system.
- RADius and RadaScan. These are radar-based systems; while the RADius has no moving parts, the RadaScan has a rotating antenna under the dome. Guidance Marine has improved the miniRadaScan with the RadaScan View which has an added advantage of radar back-scatter. This enhanced the DPO's situational awareness. These systems usually have responders which are active targets that send the signal back to the sensor to report the range and bearing. The range is typically up to 600 meters.
- Inertial navigation is used in combination with any of the above reference systems, but typically with GNSS (Global Navigation Satellite System) and Hydroacoustics (USBL, LBL, or SBL).

=== Heading systems ===
- Gyrocompasses are normally used to determine heading.

More advanced methods are:

- Ring-Laser gyroscopes.
- Fibre optic gyroscopes.
- Seapath, a combination of GPS and inertial sensors.

=== Other sensors ===
Besides position and heading, other variables are fed into the DP system through sensors:

- Motion reference units, vertical reference units or vertical reference sensors, VRUs or MRUs or VRSs, determine the ship's roll, pitch and heave.
- Wind sensors are fed into the DP system feedforward, so the system can anticipate wind gusts before the ship is blown off position.
- Draught sensors, since a change of draught influences the effect of wind and current on the hull.
- Other sensors depend on the kind of ship. A pipelay ship may measure the force required to pull the pipe; large crane vessels will have sensors to determine the crane's position, as this changes the wind model, enabling the calculation of a more accurate one (see Control systems).
- Some external forces are not directly measured. In these cases, the offset force is deduced over time, allowing an average compensating thrust to be applied. All forces not attributable to direct measurement are labeled "current", as this is what they are assumed to be. Still, in reality, this is a combination of current, waves, swell, and system errors. As is traditional in the maritime industry, DP "current" is always recorded in the direction it flows.

== Control systems ==
Block diagram of control system

In the beginning, PID controllers were used and are still used in simpler DP systems today. But modern controllers use a mathematical model of the ship that is based on a hydrodynamic and aerodynamic description concerning some of the ship's characteristics, such as mass and drag. Of course, this model is not entirely correct. The ship's position and heading are fed into the system and compared with the model's prediction. This difference is used to update the model by using the Kalman filtering technique. For this reason, the model also has input from the wind sensors and feedback from the thrusters. This method even allows not having input from any PRS for some time, depending on the quality of the model and the weather. This process is known as dead reckoning.

The accuracy and precision of the different PRSs is not the same. While a DGPS has a high accuracy and precision, a USBL can have a much lower precision. For this reason, the PRS's are weighted. Based on variance, a PRS receives a weight between 0 and 1.

== Power and propulsion systems ==
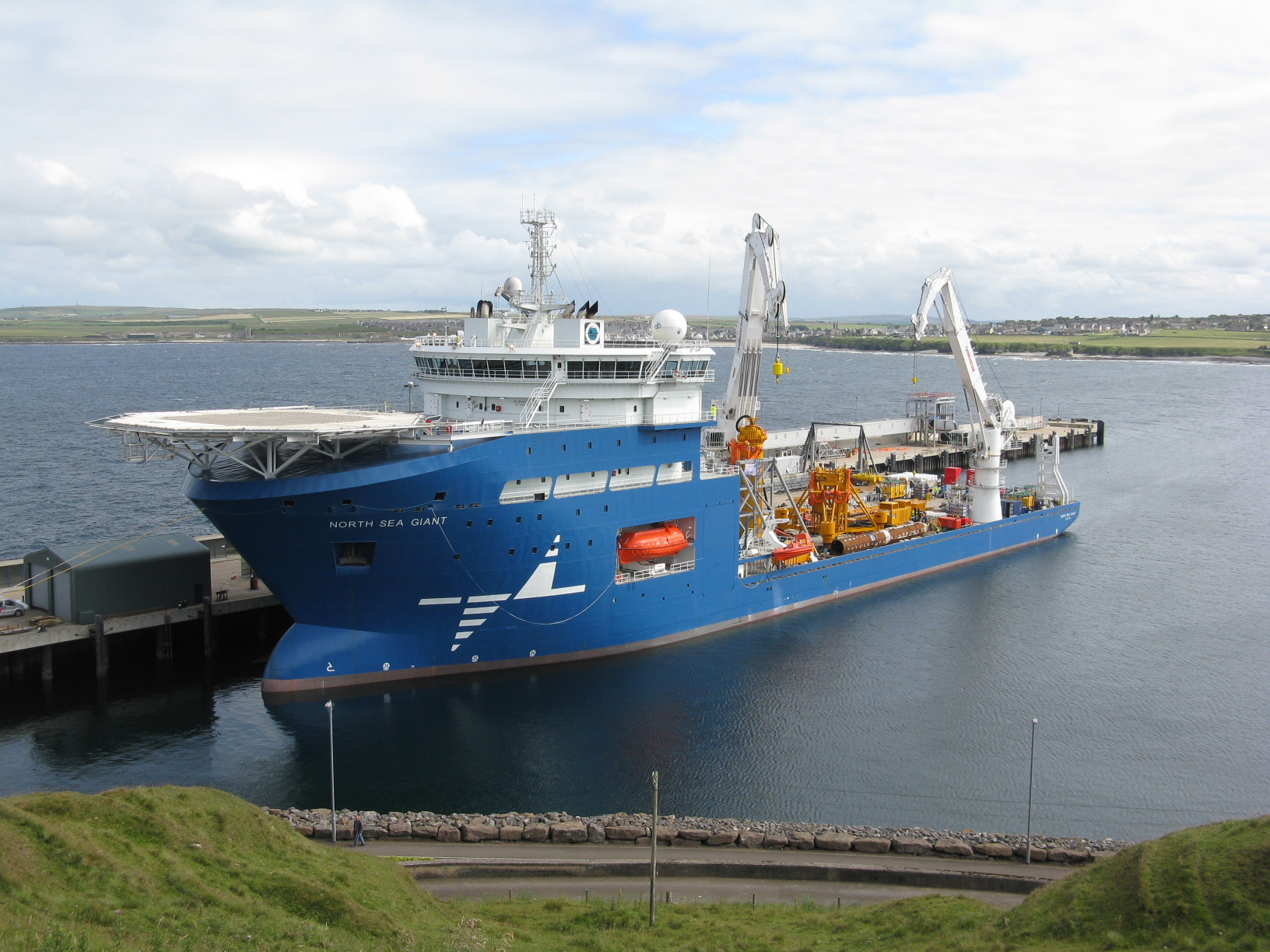
North Sea Giant

To maintain position azimuth thrusters (electric, L-drive or Z-drive) bow thrusters, stern thrusters, water jets, rudders, and propellers are used. DP ships are usually at least partially diesel-electric, as this allows a more flexible setup and better handles the large changes in power demand typical of DP operations. These fluctuations may be suitable for hybrid operation. An LNG-powered platform supply vessel started operation in 2016 with a 653 kWh/1600 kW battery acting as spinning reserve during DP2, saving 15-30% fuel. The 154-meter North Sea Giant has combined 3 powerpacks, switchboards and 3×0.67 MWh (2 MWh) batteries to operate in DP3-redundancy using only one engine, keeping the engine load between 60% and 80%.

The setup depends on the ship's DP class. A Class 1 can be relatively simple, whereas the system of a Class 3 ship is quite complex. On Class 2 and 3 ships, all computers and reference systems should be powered through an UPS.

== International Maritime Organization class requirements ==
Based on IMO (International Maritime Organization) publication 64,5 the Classification Societies have issued rules for Dynamic Positioned Ships described as Class 1, Class 2, and Class 3.

- Equipment Class 1 has no redundancy.
  Loss of position may occur in the event of a single fault.
- Equipment Class 2 has redundancy so that no single fault in an active system will cause the system to fail.
  Loss of position should not occur from a single fault of an active component or system, such as generators, thruster, switchboards, remote-controlled valves, etc., but may occur after failure of a static component, such as cables, pipes, manual valves, etc.
- Equipment Class 3, which also has to withstand fire or flood in any one compartment without the system failing.
  Loss of position should not occur from any single failure, including a completely burnt fire subdivision or flooded watertight compartment.

Classification Societies have their own Class notations:

Description	IMO; Equipment Class	LR; Equipment Class	DNV; Equipment Class	GL; Equipment Class	ABS; Equipment Class	NK; Equipment Class	BV; Equipment Class
Manual position control and automatic heading control under specified maximum environmental conditions.	-	DP(CM)	DYNPOS-AUTS	-	DPS-0	-	
Automatic and manual position and heading control under specified maximum environmental conditions.	Class 1	DP(AM)	DYNPOS-AUT & DPS1	DP 1	DPS-1	DPS A	DYNAPOS AM/AT
Automatic and manual position and heading control under specified maximum environmental conditions, during and following any single fault, excluding loss of a compartment. (Two independent computer systems).	Class 2	DP(AA)	DYNPOS-AUTR & DPS2	DP 2	DPS-2	DPS B	DYNAPOS AM/AT R
Automatic and manual position and heading control under specified maximum environmental conditions, during and following any single fault, including loss of a compartment due to fire or flood. (At least two independent computer systems with a separate backup system separated by an A60 class division).	Class 3	DP(AAA)	DYNPOS-AUTRO & DPS3	DP 3	DPS-3	DPS C	DYNAPOS AM/AT RS

DNV rules 2011, Pt 6, Ch 7, introduced the "DPS" classification series to compete with ABS's "DPS" series.

== Norwegian Maritime Authority Guidelines ==
Where IMO leaves the decision of which class applies to what kind of operation to the operator of the DP ship and its client, the Norwegian Maritime Authority (NMA) has specified what Class should be used regarding the risk of an operation. In the NMA Guidelines and Notes No. 28, enclosure A, four classes are defined:

- Class 0 Operations where loss of position-keeping capability is not considered to endanger human lives, or cause damage.
- Class 1 Operations where loss of position-keeping capability may cause damage or pollution of small consequence.
- Class 2 Operations where loss of position-keeping capability may cause personnel injury, pollution, or damage with large economic consequences.
- Class 3 Operations where loss of position keeping capability may cause fatal accidents or severe pollution or damage with major economic consequences.

Based on this, the type of ship is specified for each operation:

- Class 1 DP units with equipment class 1 should be used during operations where loss of position is not considered to endanger human lives, cause significant damage, or cause more than minimal pollution.
- Class 2 DP units with equipment class 2 should be used during operations where loss of position could cause personnel injury, pollution, or damage with great economic consequences.
- Class 3 DP units with equipment class 3 should be used during operations where loss of position could cause fatal accidents, severe pollution, or damage with major economic consequences.

== Failure ==
Loss of position, also known as runoff, can threaten safe operations and the environment, including possible loss of life, injury, damage to property or the environment, and loss of reputation and time. Incident records indicate that even vessels with redundant dynamic positioning systems experience occasional loss of position, which may result from human error, procedural failures, dynamic positioning system failures, or poor design.

Dynamic positioning failure results in an inability to maintain position or heading control and can cause a drift-off due to insufficient thrust or a drive-off due to inappropriate thrust.

- Risk of runoff.
- Consequences – for drilling, diving, and other operations. Injury to divers is possible. Damage to diving equipment, including the cutting of the diver's umbilical, has occurred.
- Mitigation – dealing with a runoff; training and competence; emergency drills.

=== Dynamic positioning alarm and runout response for bell divers ===
- Code amber / Yellow alert – Divers return to the bell immediately, stow umbilicals, and stand by for further developments and instructions.
- Code red – Divers return to the bell without delaying to retrieve tools and prepare for immediate ascent. The bell can not be recovered until the umbilicals have been safely stowed.

The basic response with a closed bell is similar to that with a wet bell, but after stowing the umbilicals, the hatch will be sealed to retain internal pressure. The bell will be recovered as rapidly as possible in a red alert, and may be recovered if there is doubt that a yellow alert will be downgraded.

=== Redundancy ===
Redundancy is the ability to withstand, while in DP mode, the loss of equipment that is online, without losing position or heading. A single failure can be, amongst others:

- Thruster failure
- Generator (power supply) failure
- Power bus failure (when generators are combined on one power bus)
- Control computer failure
- Position reference system failure
- Reference system failure

For certain operations, redundancy is not required. For instance, if a survey ship loses its DP capability, there is normally no risk of damage or injury. These operations will normally be done in Class 1.

For other operations, such as diving and heavy lifting, there is a risk of damage or injury. Depending on the risk, the operation is done in Class 2 or 3. This means at least three Position reference systems should be selected. This allows the voting logic to be applied, enabling the failing PRS to be found. For this reason, there are also three DP control computers, three gyrocompasses, three MRU's, and three wind sensors on Class 3 ships. If a single fault occurs that jeopardizes the redundancy, i.e., the failure of a thruster, generator, or PRS, and this cannot be resolved immediately, the operation should be abandoned as quickly as possible.

To have sufficient redundancy, enough generators and thrusters should be online so that the failure of one does not result in a loss of position. This is left to the judgment of the DP operator. For Classes 2 and 3, a Consequence Analysis should be incorporated into the system to assist the DPO in this process.

The redundancy of a DP ship should be judged by a failure mode and effects analysis (FMEA) study and proved by FMEA trials. Besides that, annual trials are done. Normally, DP function tests are completed before each project.

== DP operator ==
The DP operator (DPO) assesses whether sufficient redundancy is available at any given moment during the operation. IMO issued MSC/Circ.738 (Guidelines for dynamic positioning system (DP) operator training) on 24-06-1996. This refers to IMCA (International Marine Contractors Association) M 117 as an acceptable standard.

To qualify as a DP operator, the following path should be followed:

1. a DP Induction course + Online Examination
2. a minimum of 60 days seagoing DP familiarisation
3. a DP Advanced course + Online Examination
4. a minimum of 60 days watchkeeping on a DP ship
5. a statement of suitability by the master of a DP ship

When the watchkeeping is done on a Class 1 DP ship, a limited certificate will be issued; otherwise, a full certificate will be issued.

The DP training and certification scheme is operated by The Nautical Institute (NI). The NI issues logbooks to trainees, accredits training centers, and controls certification issuance.

With ever more DP ships and rising workforce demands, the DPO role is gaining prominence. This shifting landscape led to the creation of The International Dynamic Positioning Operators Association (IDPOA) in 2009.

IDPOA membership comprises certified DPOs who qualify for fellowship (fDPO), while members (mDPO) are those with DP experience or who may already be working within the DP certification scheme.

== International Marine Contractors Association ==
The International Marine Contractors Association was formed in April 1995 from the amalgamation of the Dynamic Positioning Vessel Owners Association, founded in 1990, and the International Association of Offshore Diving Contractors, founded in 1972.

While it started with the collection and analysis of DP Incidents, since then, it has produced publications on different subjects to improve standards for DP systems. It also works with IMO and other regulatory bodies.

== Marine Technology Society Dynamic Positioning Committee ==
The Marine Technology Society Dynamic Positioning (DP) Committee's mission is to facilitate incident-free DP operations. This committee of volunteers contributes to the DP community of vessel owners, operators, Marine Class Societies, engineers, and regulators through an annual DP Conference, topical workshops, and an extensive set of Guidance Documents covering DP Design Philosophy, DP Operations, and Professional Development of DP Personnel. In addition, a growing set of unique documents, collectively called TECHOP, addresses specific topics of significant interest and impact. Conference papers are available for public download, providing a source of DP industry technical papers.

The DP Guidance documents published by the MTS DP Committee are designed to share knowledge, methods, and unique tools to help the DP community achieve incident-free DP operations.

== See also ==
- Autonomous spaceport drone ship – Floating landing platform operated by SpaceX
- Autopilot – System to maintain vehicle trajectory in lieu of direct operator command
- Last Breath (2019 film) – 2019 documentary about a dynamic positioning failure that led to a serious accident, a severed umbilical, and the near loss of a diver
