= Drilling riser =

Conduit providing an extension of a subsea oil well to a surface drilling facility

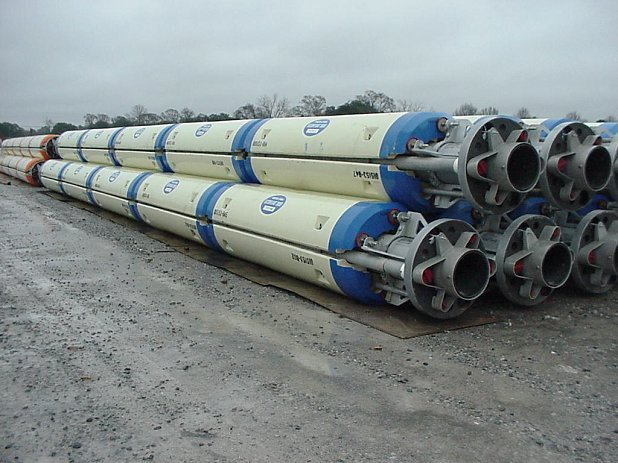
Drilling riser joints with buoyancy modules

A drilling riser is a conduit that provides a temporary extension of a subsea oil well to a surface drilling facility. Drilling risers are categorised into two types: marine drilling risers used with subsea blowout preventer (BOP) and generally used by floating drilling vessels; and tie-back drilling risers used with a surface BOP and generally deployed from fixed platforms or very stable floating platforms like a spar or tension leg platform (TLP).

== Marine drilling riser ==
A marine drilling riser has a large diameter, low pressure main tube with external auxiliary lines that include high pressure choke and kill lines for circulating fluids to the subsea blowout preventer (BOP), and usually power and control lines for the BOP. The design and operation of marine drilling risers is complex, and the requirement for high reliability means an extensive amount of engineering analysis is required.

When used in water depths greater than about 20 meters, the marine drilling riser has to be tensioned to maintain stability. A marine riser tensioner located on the drilling platform provides a near constant tension force adequate to maintain the stability of the riser in the offshore environment. The level of tension required is related to the weight of the riser equipment, the buoyancy of the riser, the forces from waves and currents, the weight of the internal fluids, and an adequate allowance for equipment failures.

To reduce the amount of tension required to maintain stability of the riser, buoyancy modules, known in the industry as 'buoyancy cakes', are added to the riser joints to make them close to neutrally buoyant when submerged.

The international standard ISO 13624-1:2009 covers the design, selection, operation and maintenance of marine riser systems for floating drilling operations. Its purpose is to serve as a reference for designers, for those who select system components, and for those who use and maintain this equipment. It relies on basic engineering principles and the accumulated experience of offshore operators, contractors, and manufacturers.

== Tie-back drilling riser ==
A tie-back riser can be either a single large-diameter high pressure pipe, or a set of concentric pipes extending the casing strings in the well up to a surface BOP.

== See also ==
- Offshore drilling
- Oil platform
