= Transocean =

Offshore drilling contractor

Transocean Ltd.
- Type: Public
- Traded as: NYSE: RIG
- ISIN: CH0048265513
- Industry: Oilfield services, offshore drilling & equipment
- Predecessor: The Offshore Company
- Founded: 1926; 100 years ago
- Headquarters: Houston, Texas
- Key people: Keelan Adamson, President & CEO; Jeremy Thigpen, Chairman; Thad Vayda, CFO
- Products: Offshore drilling services of semi-submersible and drillships
- Revenue: ▲US$3.088 billion (2019) ▲US$1 billion (2018)
- Operating income: ▲ −US$721 million (2019)
- Net income: ▲ −US$1.257 billion (2019)
- Total assets: ▼US$24.105 billion (2019)
- Total equity: ▼US$11.867 billion (2019)
- Number of employees: 6,600 (2019)
- Website: www.deepwater.com

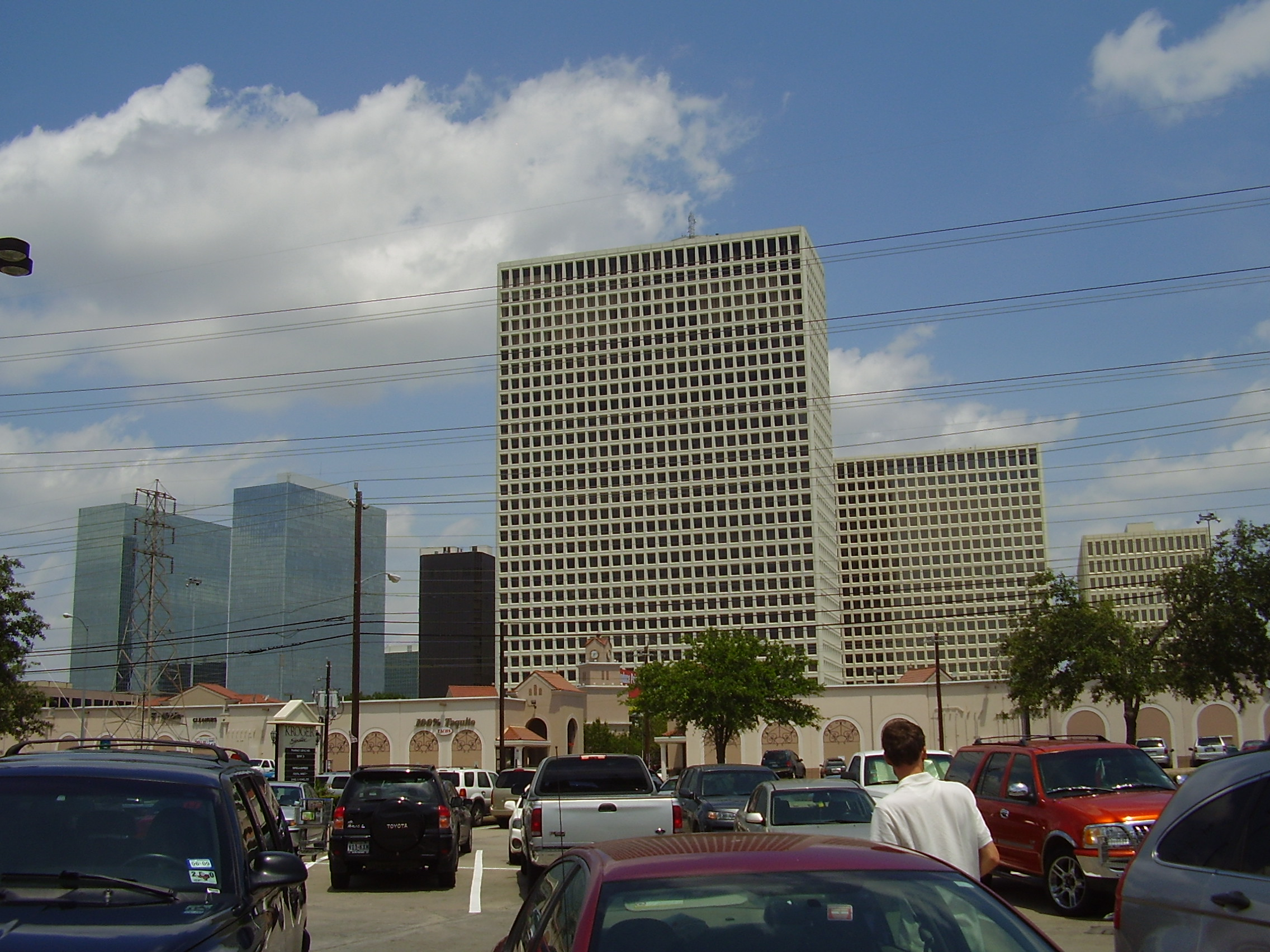
Greenway Plaza, the location of Transocean's Houston offices

Transocean Ltd. is a Swiss offshore drilling company. It is the world's largest offshore drilling contractor based on revenue. The company has offices in 20 countries, including Canada, the United States, Norway, United Kingdom, India, Brazil, Singapore, Indonesia, and Malaysia.

The primary business of Transocean is contracts with other large companies in the oil and gas industry. In 2019, Royal Dutch Shell, Equinor and Chevron accounted for 26%, 21% and 17% of the company's revenues respectively.

In 2010, Transocean was found partially responsible (30% of total liability) for the Deepwater Horizon oil spill resulting from the explosion of its offshore drilling rig (which was named Deepwater Horizon) in the Gulf of Mexico.

The company's principle executive offices are located in Steinhausen, Switzerland.

== History ==
Transocean was formed as a result of the merger of Southern Natural Gas Company, later Sonat, with many smaller drilling companies.

In 1953, the Birmingham, Alabama-based Southern Natural Gas Company created The Offshore Company after acquiring the joint drilling operation DeLong-McDermott from DeLong Engineering and J. Ray McDermott. In 1954, the company launched Rig 51, the first mobile jackup rig, in the Gulf of Mexico. In 1967, the Offshore Company went public. In 1978, SNG turned it into a wholly owned subsidiary. In 1982, it was changed to Sonat Offshore Drilling Inc., reflecting a change in its parent's name. William C. O'Malley, an executive at Sonat's headquarters in Birmingham, was named the company's first Chief Executive Officer in 1992. In 1993, Sonat spun off the majority of its ownership in the company. Sonat sold its remaining 40% stake in the company during a secondary public offering in late 1995.

In 1996, the company acquired Norwegian group Transocean ASA for US$1.5 billion. Transocean started in the 1970s as a whaling company and expanded through a series of mergers. The new company was called Transocean Offshore. The new company began building massive drilling operations with drills capable of going to 10,000 feet (as opposed to 3,000 feet at the time) and operating two drill operations on the same ship. Its first ship, Discoverer Enterprise, cost nearly US$430 million and was 834 ft (254 m). The Enterprise class drillship is the largest of the drilling ships.

In 1999, Transocean merged with Sedco Forex, the offshore drilling subsidiary of Schlumberger in a $3.2 billion stock transaction in which Schlumberger shareholders received shares of Transocean.

Sedco Forex had been formed from a merger of two drilling companies, the Southeastern Drilling Company (Sedco), founded in 1947 by Bill Clements and acquired by Schlumberger in 1985 for $1 billion and French drilling company Forages et Exploitations Pétrolières (Forex) founded in 1942 in German-occupied France for drilling in North Africa. Schlumberger first got a foothold in the company in 1959 and then assumed total control in 1964, and renamed it Forex Neptune Drilling Company.

In 2005, the company's Discoverer Spirit rig set a world record for the deepest offshore oil and gas well of 34,189 ft (10,421 m).

In 2007, the US Department of Justice and the Securities and Exchange Commission filed a case against Transocean, alleging violations of the Foreign Corrupt Practices Act. The case alleged that Transocean paid bribes through its freight forwarding agents to Nigerian customs officials. Transocean later admitted to approving the bribes and agreed to pay US$13,440,000 to settle the matter.

In 2007, the company merged with GlobalSantaFe Corporation in a transaction that created a company with an enterprise value of $53 billion. Shareholders of GlobalSantaFe Corporation received $15 billion of cash as well as stock in the new company for their shares. Robert E. Rose, who was non-executive chairman of GlobalSantaFe, was made Transocean's chairman. Rose had been chairman of Global Marine prior to its 2001 merger with Santa Fe International Corporation.

In September 2009, its Deepwater Horizon rig established a 35,050 ft (10,680 m) well, the deepest well in history – more than 5,000 feet deeper than its stated design specification.

In 2012, the company sold 38 shallow water rigs and narrowed its focus on high-specification deepwater rigs.

In October 2013, the company was added to the S&P 500 index, replacing Dell.

In February 2015, CEO Steven Newman stepped down following a $2.2 billion quarterly loss.

Effective on 30 March 2016, the company delisted its shares from the SIX Swiss Exchange, at which time its shares were removed from the Swiss Market Index.

In February 2025, Transocean's drilling rig, Mighty Barents, began drilling gas wells in one of the EU's largest gas project, Neptun Deep, with plans to begin gas production in 2027.

In April 2025, Keelan Adamson, former COO of Transocean, took over as CEO of the company.

Transocean sold four of its idle rigs to an undisclosed buyer in September 2025. Included in the sale was the Discoverer India, Discoverer Clear Leader, Discoverer Americas, and Deepwater Champion, all of which had been cold stacked for years prior to the sale.

In October 2025, Transocean extended two drilling rig contracts totaling $243 million with Petrobras and BP.

== Acquisitions ==
In 2000, Transocean acquired R&B Falcon Corporation, owner of 115 drilling rigs, in a deal valued at $17.7 billion. With the acquisition, Transocean gained control of what at the time was the world's largest offshore operation. Among R&B Falcon's assets was the Deepwater Horizon.

In 2011, the company acquired Aker Drilling, which owned 4 harsh environment rigs used for drilling near Norway.

Effective on 30 January 2018, the company completed its acquisition of Songa Offshore. Later that year in December, the company acquired Ocean Rig for $2.7 billion.

== Controversies ==
=== Accidents and incidents ===
Transocean was rated as a leader in its industry for many years. However, since the company's 2007 merger with GlobalSantaFe, Transocean's reputation has suffered considerably, according to EnergyPoint Research, an independent oil service industry rating firm. From 2004 to 2007, Transocean was the leader or near the top among deep-water drillers in "job quality" and "overall satisfaction." In 2008 and 2009, surveys ranked Transocean as last among deep-water drillers for "job quality" and next to last in "overall satisfaction." In 2008 and 2009, Transocean ranked first for in-house safety and environmental policies, and in the middle of the pack for perceived environmental and safety record. The Deepwater Horizon explosion and massive oil spill, starting in April 2010, further hurt its reputation. "Transocean is dominant, but the accident has definitely tarnished its reputation for worker safety and for being able to manage and deliver on extraordinarily complex deepwater projects," said Christopher Ruppel, an energy expert and managing director of capital markets at Execution Noble, an investment bank.

==== Transocean Leader accident (2002) ====
On 2 March 2002, a Scottish man was killed in an accident aboard the Transocean Leader drilling rig operated for BP, located about 138 kilometers (86 miles) west of Shetland, Scotland.

==== Galveston Bay explosion (2003) ====
On 17 June 2003, one worker was killed, four others were hospitalised and 21 were evacuated after an explosion on a Transocean gas drilling rig in Galveston Bay, Texas.

==== Maintenance citation on Transocean Rather (2005) ====
On 24 August 2005, the UK Health and Safety Executive issued a notice to Transocean saying that, it had failed to maintain its "remote blowout preventor control panel … in an efficient state, efficient working order and in good repair." On 21 November 2005, Transocean was found to be in compliance for this matter.

==== Sinking of Bourbon Dolphin supply boat and Transocean Rather accident (2007) ====
On 12 April 2007, the Bourbon Dolphin supply boat sank off the coast of Scotland while servicing the Transocean Rather drilling rig, killing eight people. The Norwegian Ministry of Justice established a Commission of Inquiry to investigate the incident, and the commission's report found a series of "unfortunate circumstances" led to the accident "with many of them linked to Bourbon Offshore and Transocean."

==== 2008 fatalities ====
In 2008, two Transocean workers were reportedly killed on the company's vessels.

==== Deepwater Horizon drilling rig explosion (2010) ====
On 20 April 2010, a fire was reported on a Transocean-owned semisubmersible drilling rig, Deepwater Horizon. Deepwater Horizon was a RBS8D design of Reading & Bates Falcon, a firm that was acquired by Transocean in 2001. The fire broke out at 10:00 p.m. CDT UTC−5 in US waters of Mississippi Canyon Block 252 in the Gulf of Mexico. The rig was 41 mi (66 km) off the Louisiana coast. The US Coast Guard launched a rescue operation after the explosion which killed 11 workers and critically injured seven of the 126-member crew.

Deepwater Horizon was completely destroyed and subsequently sank.

As the Deepwater Horizon sank, the riser pipe that connected the well-head to the rig was severed. As a result, oil began to spill into the Gulf of Mexico. Estimates of the leak were about 80,000 barrels per day – for 87 days, resulting in 134 million gallons of oil being released into the Gulf.

Louisiana Governor Bobby Jindal declared a state of emergency on 29 April, as the oil slick grew and headed toward the most important and most sensitive wetlands in North America, threatening to destroy wildlife and the livelihood of thousands of fishermen. The head of BP Group told CNN's Brian Todd on 28 April that the accident could have been prevented and focused blame on Transocean, which owned and partly staffed the rig.

Transocean came under fire from lawyers, representing the fishing and tourism businesses that were hit by the oil spill, and the United States Department of Justice for seeking to use a Limitation of Liability Act of 1851 to restrict its liability for economic damages to $26.7 million.

During Congressional testimony, Transocean and BP blamed each other for the disaster. It emerged that a "heated argument" broke out on the platform 11 hours before the accident, in which Transocean and BP personnel disagreed on an engineering decision related to the closing of the well. On 14 May 2010, US President Barack Obama commented, "I did not appreciate what I considered to be a ridiculous spectacle… executives of BP and Transocean and Halliburton [the firm responsible for cementing the well] falling over each other to point the finger of blame at somebody else. The American people could not have been impressed with that display, and I certainly wasn't."

Transocean later claimed that 2010, the year in which the disaster occurred, was "the best year in safety performance in our company’s history". In a regulatory filing, Transocean said, "Notwithstanding the tragic loss of life in the Gulf of Mexico, we achieved an exemplary statistical safety record as measured by our total recordable incident rate and total potential severity rate." They used this justification to award employees about two-thirds of the maximum possible safety bonuses. In response to broad criticism, including from Interior Secretary Ken Salazar, the company announced that its executives would donate the safety portion of the bonuses to a fund supporting the victims' families.

==== Offshore drilling leak off the Brazilian coast (2011) ====
The offshore drilling facility Sedco 706, operated by Transocean under contract from Chevron, began to leak in November 2011 while working on the "Frade" oil field. Oil began leaking from the seabed at a depth of approximately 1100 to 1200m. Damage included an oil slick (oil floating on the ocean surface) covering an area of approximately 80 km2 and growing. This put the oil at a distance of about 370 km from Rio de Janeiro, but other beautiful beaches are much closer (estimated 140 km). The Brazilian government sued Transocean and attempted to force the company to cease operations in Brazil, but a settlement was reached without a finding of fault or liability.

==== Transocean Winner grounding on the Isle of Lewis, Scotland (2016) ====
The Transocean Winner, grounded on the coast of Isle of Lewis between Dalmor and Na Gearrannan, August 2016

In the early hours of Monday 8 August 2016, the semi-submersible drilling rig Transocean Winner ran aground near Dalmore in the Carloway district of the Isle of Lewis in the Outer Hebrides, Scotland. The rig had been under tow by the tug Alp Forward in winds of galeforce, when the tow line broke. The rig subsequently drifted ashore at Dalmore and became stuck fast on rocks at 07.30 BST. Continuing poor weather meant that a damage inspection by salvors has been practically impossible, as personnel require to be airlifted on to the rig, in spite of it being close to the shore. The rig was carrying approximately 280 tons of diesel, to power its generators, of which 53 tons is thought to have leaked into the sea, and dispersed or evaporated in rough conditions. Environmental monitoring of plant and animal life is on-going, particularly in view of the economically important fish farming operations in nearby Loch Ròg.

== See also ==
- List of oilfield service companies
- List of Texas companies (T)
