= Noble Corporation =

U.K. domiciled energy company

Noble Corporation plc
- Type: Public
- Traded as: NYSE: NE; S&P 600 component
- Industry: Petroleum industry
- Predecessor: Noble Drilling Corporation
- Founded: 1985; 41 years ago
- Headquarters: Organized in London; Main office in Houston, Texas, United States
- Key people: Robert W. Eifler, President & CEO; Richard B. Barker, CFO
- Services: Offshore Drilling
- Revenue: ▲US$3.29 billion (2025)
- Net income: ▼US$217 million (2025)
- Number of employees: 5,300 (2024)
- Website: www.noblecorp.com

Noble Corporation plc is an offshore drilling contractor organized in London, England. Its affiliate, Noble Corporation, is organized in the Cayman Islands. It is the corporate successor of Noble Drilling Corporation.

The company operates 38 drilling rigs including seventeen drillships, eight semi-submersible platforms, and thirteen jackup rigs.

In 2020, 26.6% of revenues were from ExxonMobil, 21.7% of revenues were from Shell, 14.3% of revenues were from Equinor, and 13.8% of revenues were from Saudi Aramco.

== History ==
In 1985, Noble Affiliates, Inc., completed the corporate spin-off of Noble Drilling Corporation.

In 2002, the company underwent a restructuring whereby it moved its domicile to the Cayman Islands and established Noble Corporation as the parent holding company.

In early 2009, the company moved its domicile from the Cayman Islands to Switzerland due to the potential for more U.S. taxes on Caribbean tax havens. In 2013, the company moved to the United Kingdom.

In 2010, the company acquired Frontier Drilling in a $2.16 billion cash transaction.

In 2014, the company distributed its interests in Paragon Offshore plc to its shareholders.

In July 2020, the company filed for bankruptcy; it emerged from bankruptcy in February 2021.

In April 2021, the company acquired Pacific Drilling.

In November 2021, it was announced that Maersk Drilling would merge with Noble Corporation and the combined company would be called Noble Corporation, with a valuation of £2.6 billion. The merger was completed on October 3, 2022.

In June 2024, the company announced it would acquire Diamond Offshore Drilling for $1.6 billion in a cash-and-stock deal. The company now has 5300 employees and operates more than 35 rigs.

In December 2025, it was announced Noble had agreed to sell five premium jack-up drilling rigs to the Bermuda-based Borr Drilling Limited for approximately US$360 million. The transaction, expected to close in the first quarter of 2026 subject to customary conditions, includes three Friede & Goldman JU-3000N design rigs and two Gusto MSC CJ50 design rigs, with two of the units to be chartered back to Noble on a temporary bareboat basis. In January 2026, it was announced that Noble had completed the sale. Noble reported that the transaction generated approximately $210 million in cash and included $150 million in seller notes.

=== Accidents and incidents ===
In 2012, the Noble Discoverer drillship, operating under contract for Shell lost its mooring and drifted close to shore. There were no injuries or environmental damage reported as a result of the accident.

In 2017, employee Steve Sutherland, a 49 year old from Aberdeen , went missing on the Noble Lloyd Noble drilling rig. The search was scaled back after a time and he was never recovered.
