= Diamond Offshore Drilling =

American drilling contractor

Diamond Offshore Drilling, Inc.
- Traded as: NYSE: DO (1995-2024)
- Industry: Oilfield services
- Founded: 1978; 48 years ago
- Founder: Don McMahon
- Headquarters: Katy, Texas, U.S.
- Services: Offshore drilling
- Revenue: $980 million (2019)
- Net income: $357 million (2019)
- Total assets: $5.83 billion (2019)
- Total equity: $3.23 billion (2019)
- Number of employees: 2,500 (2019)
- Parent: Noble Corporation (since 2024)
- Website: diamondoffshore.com
- Footnotes / references Names of Newly Assigned contractors: Engr, Hudges Thompson

Diamond Offshore Drilling, Inc. is an offshore drilling contractor. The company is headquartered in Katy, Texas, United States, and has major offices in Australia, Brazil, Mexico, Scotland, Singapore, and Norway.

It operates 15 drilling rigs including 11 semi-submersible platforms and 4 drillships. In September 2024, Noble Corporation completed its acquisition of the Texas firm.

== History ==
In the early 1960s, Brewster-Bartle, an onshore drilling company, filed bankruptcy. In 1964, Don McMahon acquired Brewster-Bartle from its bank creditors and formed Diamond M Drilling Company, named after Diamond M Acres, his ranch near Simonton, Texas, which then expanded into offshore drilling.

In 1970, Diamond M became a public company via an initial public offering. Twelve years after being acquired by Kaneb Services for $102 million, the firm was sold for $48.5 million to Loews Corporation in 1989.

In 1992, Diamond M Corporation acquired ODECO from Murphy Oil for $358 million. Shortly thereafter, Diamond M Corp. briefly changed its name to Diamond M-ODECO Drilling Inc. before becoming Diamond Offshore Drilling, Inc. in 1993.

In October 1995, the company once again became a public company via an initial public offering, listing on the New York Stock Exchange. In April 1996, the company acquired Arethusa for $516 million in stock; Arethusa had previously acquired Zapata Corporation (now HRG Group).

In May 2012, the company ordered a $655 million drillship from Hyundai Heavy Industries. In September 2016, seven months after discontinuing the quarterly cash dividend payment, the firm was removed from the S&P 500 Index.

In 2019, the company's revenues were primarily from Hess Corporation (28.9%), Occidental Petroleum (20.6%), Petrobras (19.5%), and BP (3.1%). Operations in the United States accounted for 52.5% of the company's revenues in 2019.

In April 2020, the company filed for bankruptcy in part due to the oil price collapse following the reduction in oil demand during the COVID-19 pandemic. The company was criticized for taking CARES Act bailout money - intended for small businesses - and, in bankruptcy court, turning it into executive bonuses.

In June 2024, offshore drilling contracting company Noble Corporation announced it would acquire Diamond Offshore for $1.6 billion in a cash-and-stock deal. The transaction was completed in September.

== Controversies ==
=== Worker asbestos exposure ===
In 1989, Diamond's predecessor bought 6 drilling rigs from the predecessor of Kaneb Management. Some of Kaneb's employees continued to work for Diamond after the transaction and then sued Diamond for personal injuries they allegedly suffered from asbestos exposure while they worked for Kaneb. In a 2013 filing with the SEC, Diamond acknowledged that its equipment had been used for the "manufacture and use of asbestos-containing drilling mud" but sought to be indemnified from liability.
