= Maersk Convincer =

Maersk jackup rig

Coordinates: 26.18602°N 50.67162°E

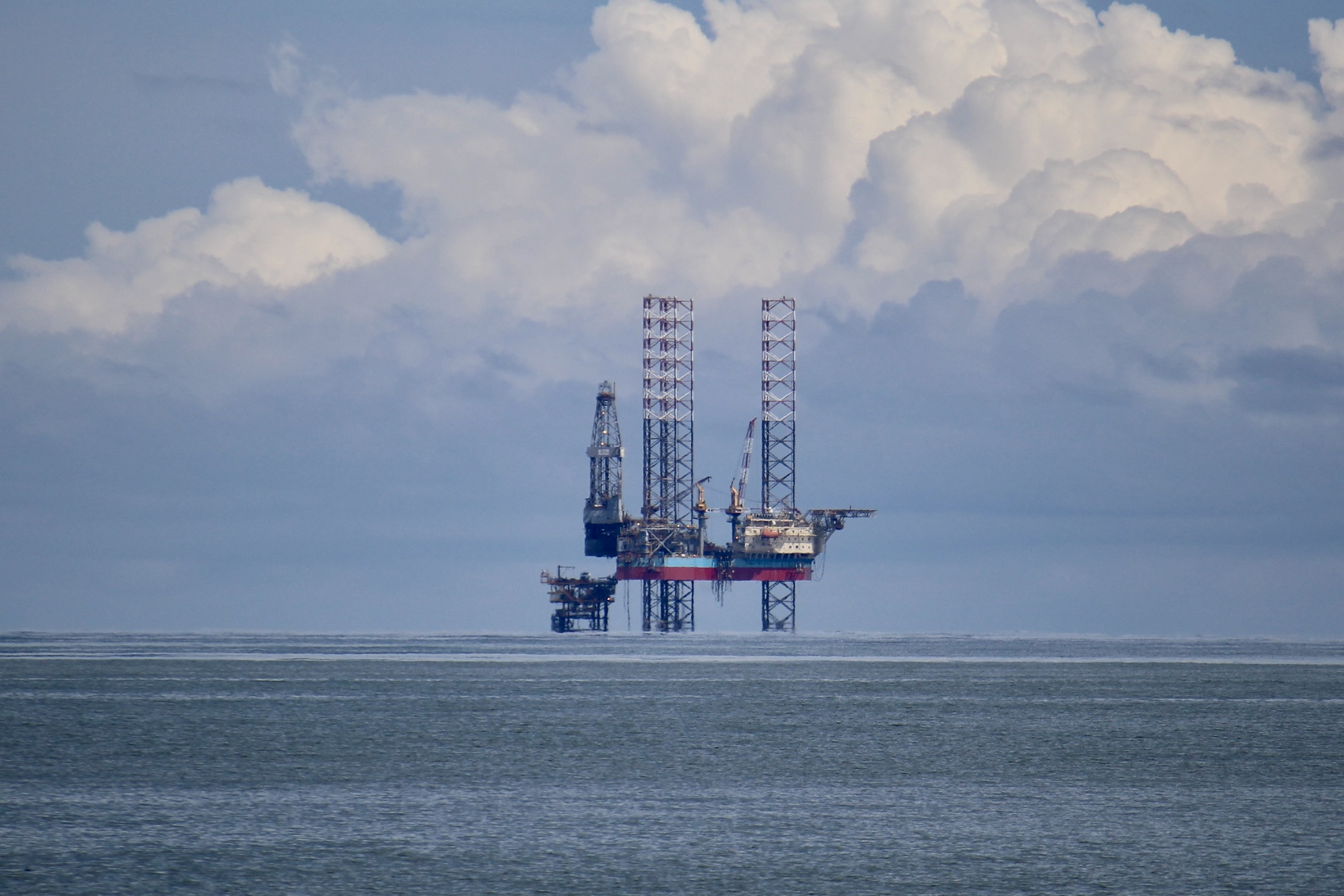
- Maersk Convincer off Tutong in 2022

History
- Name: Maersk Convincer
- Namesake: Convincer
- Owner: Maersk Drilling, Singapore
- Builder: Jurong Shipyard, Singapore
- In service: 2008
- Renamed: From PetroJack III, 2008
- Identification: IMO number: 8768426; MMSI number: 565676000
- Status: Active

General characteristics
- Type: Cantilever jackup rig
- Displacement: 9,985 tonnes (9,827 long tons) full load
- Length: 72 m (236 ft 3 in)
- Height: 114 m (375 ft)
- Propulsion: Drifting
- Speed: 0.1 kn
- Crew: 118
- Aviation facilities: 1 × helipad

Maersk Convincer is a jackup rig built in Singapore. It was originally named PetroJack III. It was acquired and owned by Danish Maersk Drilling for operations in Southeast Asia. In 2022, Maersk Drilling sold the jackup rig to ADES.

== Construction and career ==
Maersk Convincer was built in the mid 2000s and was originally named PetroJack III by Jurong Shipyard, Jurong, Singapore and entered service in 2008. Maersk Convincer's first service took place in Brunei for the first time and worked for Brunei Shell Petroleum for workover and development. In 2010, she went to Vietnam for exploration under Haong Long and later Phy Quy Petroleum. Her next contract was in Malaysia under Petronas for exploration, development and workover in 2012.

Maersk Convincer arrived in Brunei in September 2017 for the second time and work for Brunei Shell Petroleum by taking over for Maersk Completer. In November 2018, she got a 2.5 year contract extension in Brunei. Maersk Convincer won the Jack-up rig of the year in 2019 outstanding contributions. However, Maersk Drilling sought to consolidate its drilling operations in the North Sea in 2022 and sold Maersk Convincer to ADES in April. As part of the deal, Maersk Convinver was released from its contract with Brunei Shell Petroleum, ending operations in the area by mid-September.

== Gallery ==
Maersk Convincer Gallery

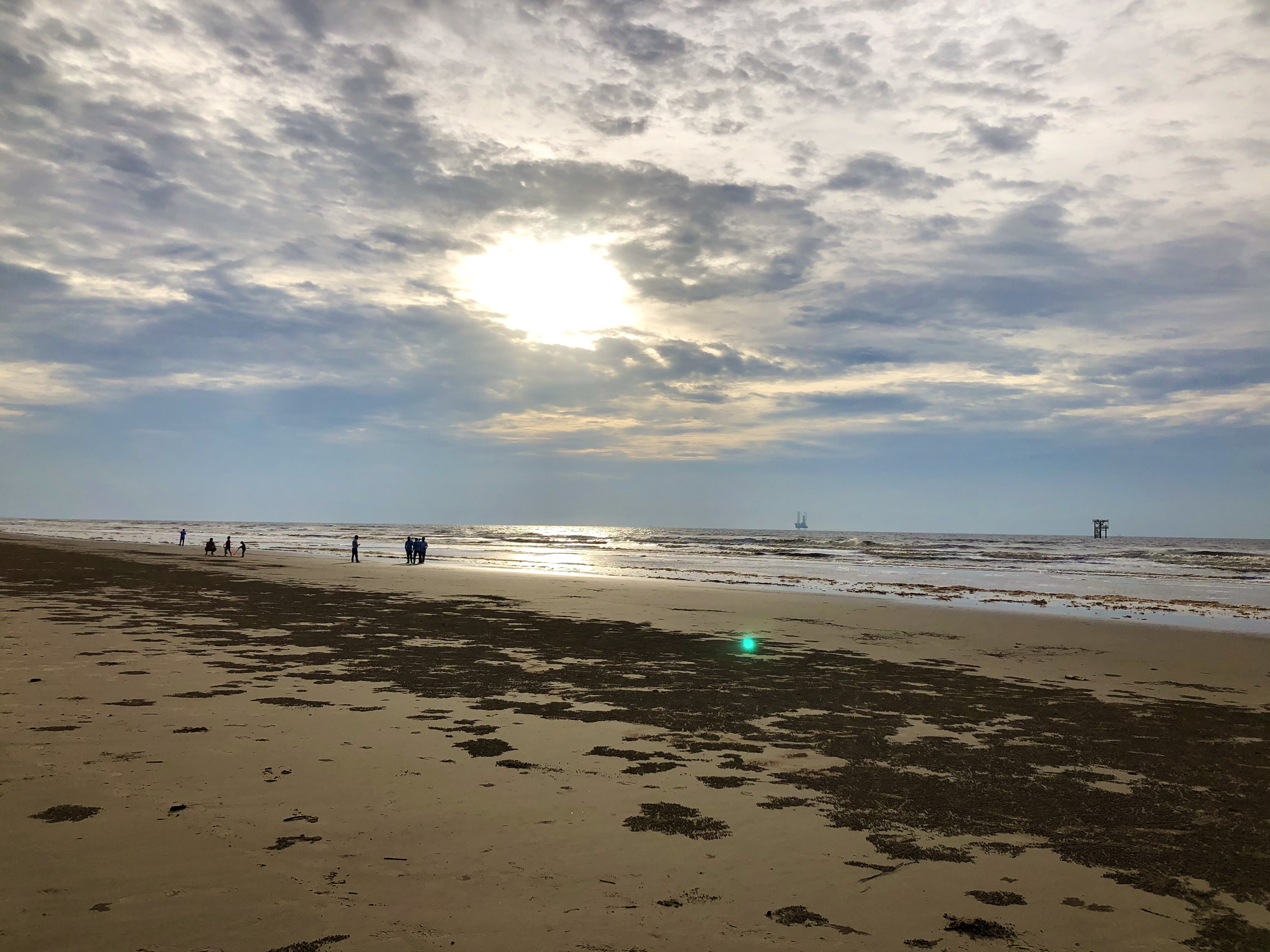
Maersk Convincer in Tali Oil Field off Seria, Brunei on 1 August 2020.

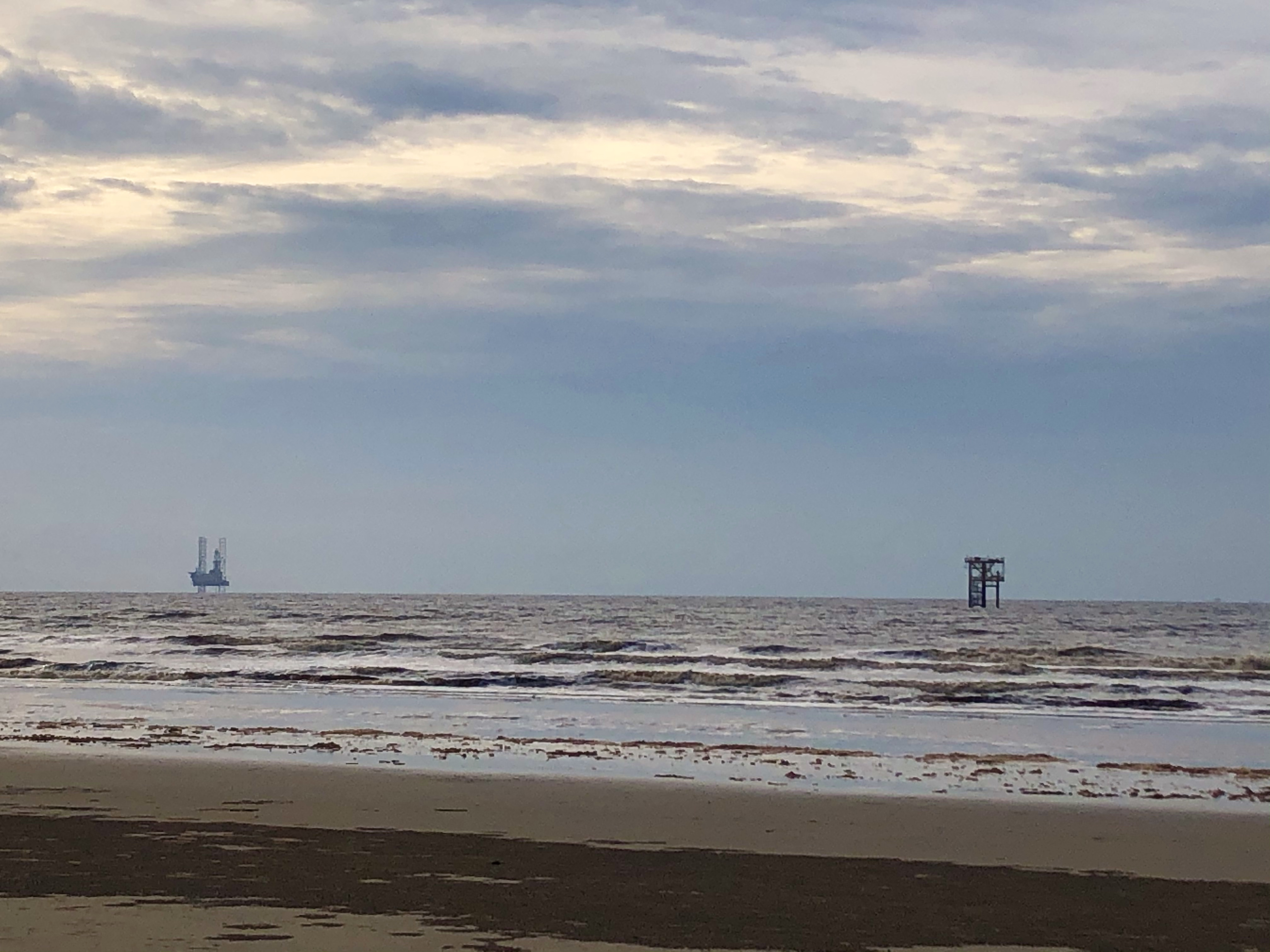
Maersk Convincer in Tali Oil Field off Seria, Brunei on 1 August 2020.

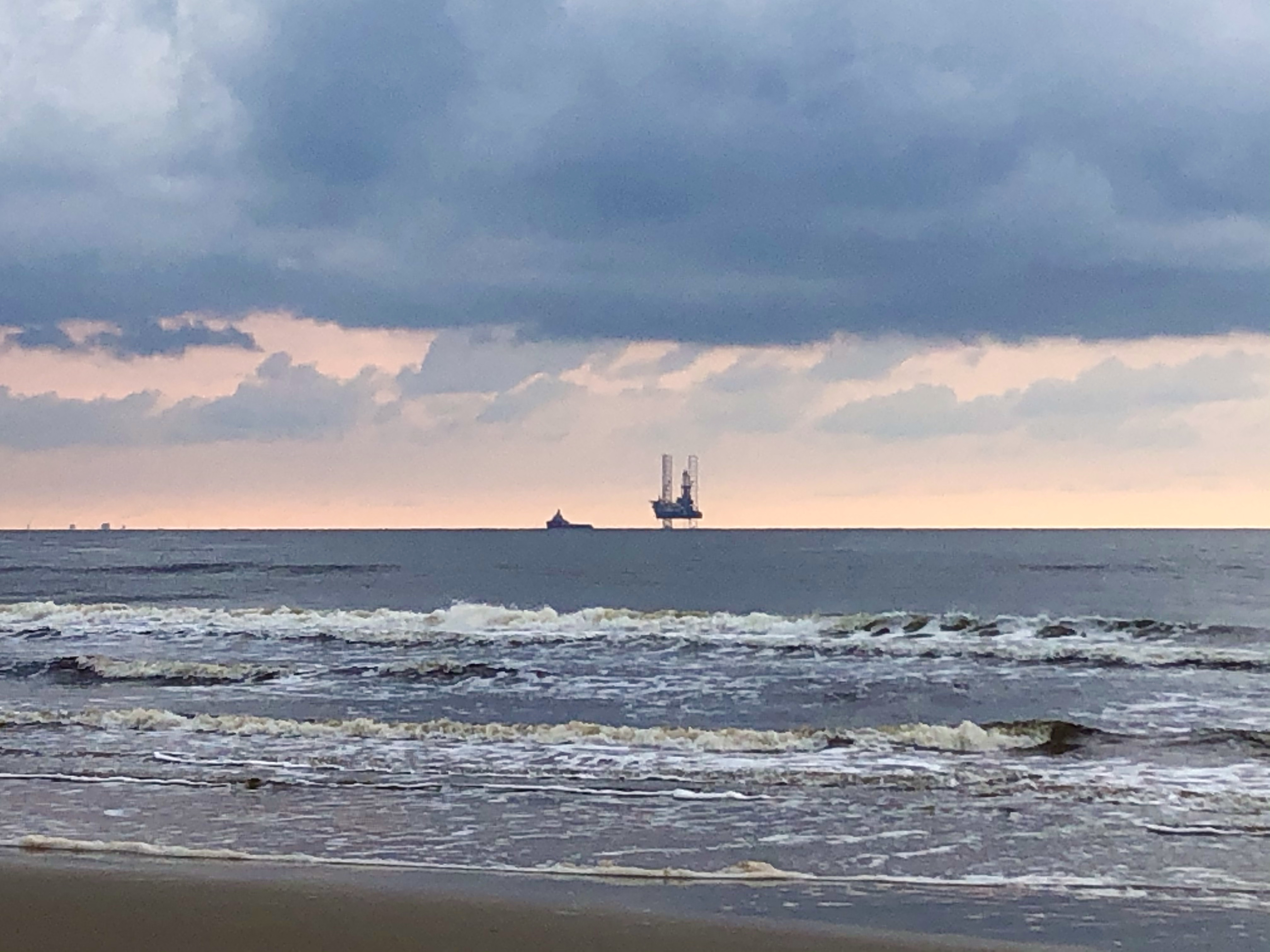
Maersk Convincer in Tali Oil Field off Seria, Brunei on 9 August 2020.

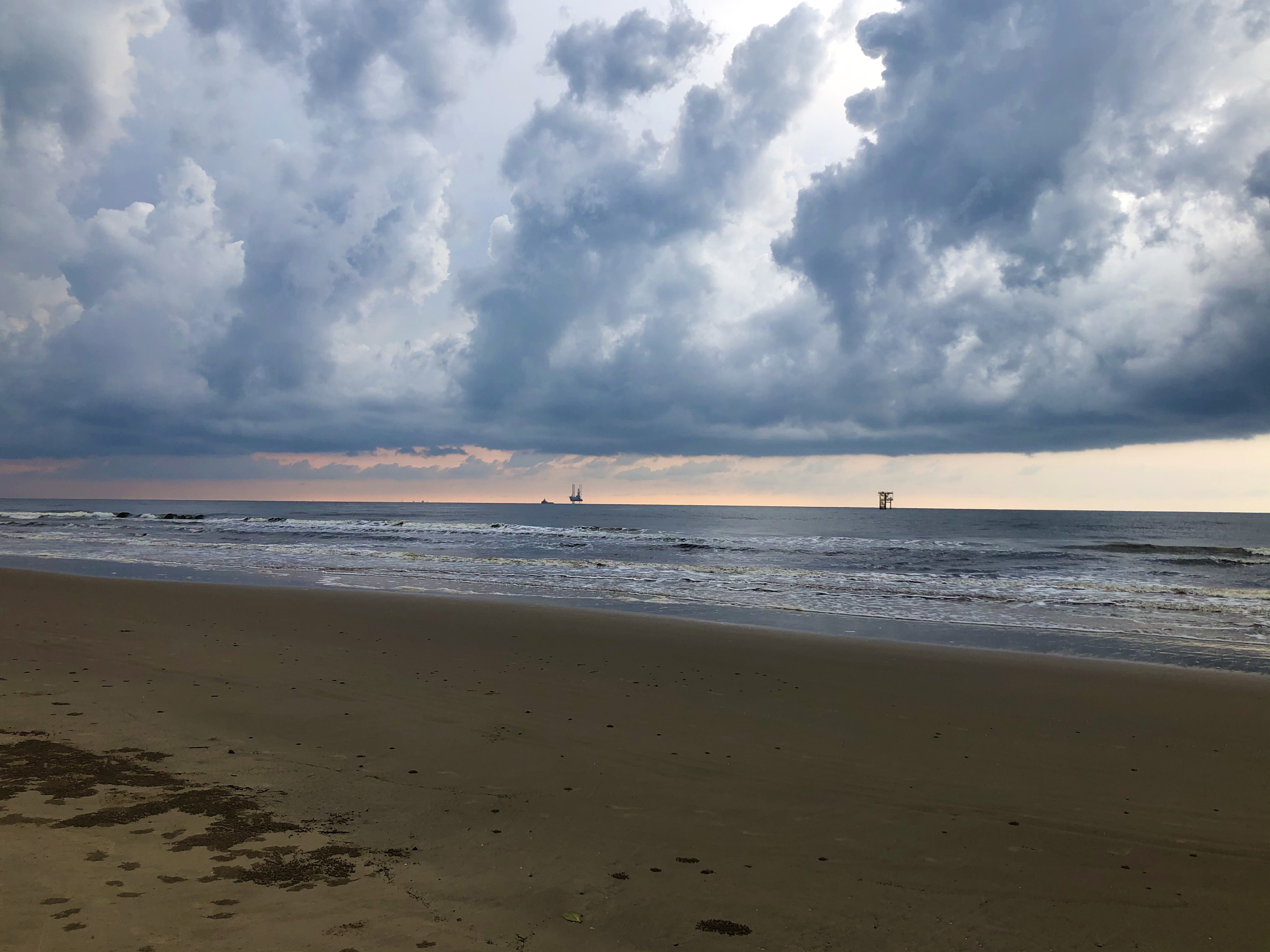
Maersk Convincer in Tali Oil Field off Seria, Brunei on 9 August 2020.
