= Submersible drilling rig =

Vessel floated to site and lowered onto the seabed for drilling

A submersible drilling rig is a marine vessel design that can be floated to location and lowered onto the sea floor for offshore drilling activities.

== Design and operation ==
The submersible drilling platform is supported on large pontoon-like structures. These pontoons provide buoyancy allowing the unit to be towed from location to location.

Once on the location, the pontoon structure is slowly flooded until it rests securely on its anchors, of which there are usually two per corner.

The operating deck is elevated 100 feet above the pontoons on large steel columns to provide clearance above the waves.

After the well is drilled, the water is pumped out of the buoyancy tanks and the vessel is re-floated and towed to the next location.

Submersibles, as they are known informally, operate in relatively shallow water, since they must rest on the sea floor. Other floating vessel types are used in deeper water depths. The term Mobile Offshore Drilling Unit (MODU) is generally used for all offshore drilling rigs that can be moved from location to location.

== Evolution ==
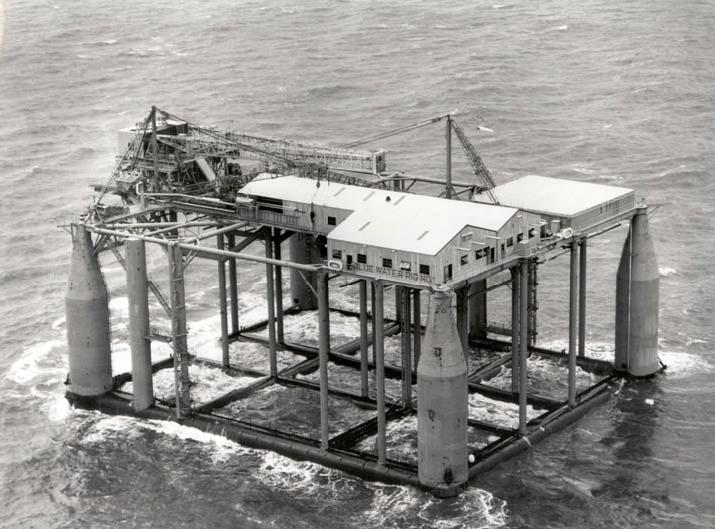
Blue Water Rig No. 1

The first offshore mobile drilling platform was the Hayward-Barnsdall Breton Rig 20, first operated in 1949. This rig had evolved from the inland drilling barges which were used to drill in marshes and protected waters in up to 10 feet of water. The Breton Rig 20 was 160 feet by 85 feet, and could work in 20 feet water depth.

By 1958, the number of submersible drilling rigs had increased to around 30.

In 1961, Shell Oil successfully converted an existing submersible rig Blue Water Rig No.1 into the first semi submersible drilling unit for operation in the Gulf of Mexico when it was found to have good stability and motions whilst being towed at a partial draught.

Alden J. Laborde designed and constructed the first purpose-built V-shaped semi-submersible drilling rig, Ocean Driller, delivered in 1963.
