= Ocean Ranger =

Offshore oil rig that sank in 1982

Coordinates: 46°43′33.53″N 48°50′9.13″W

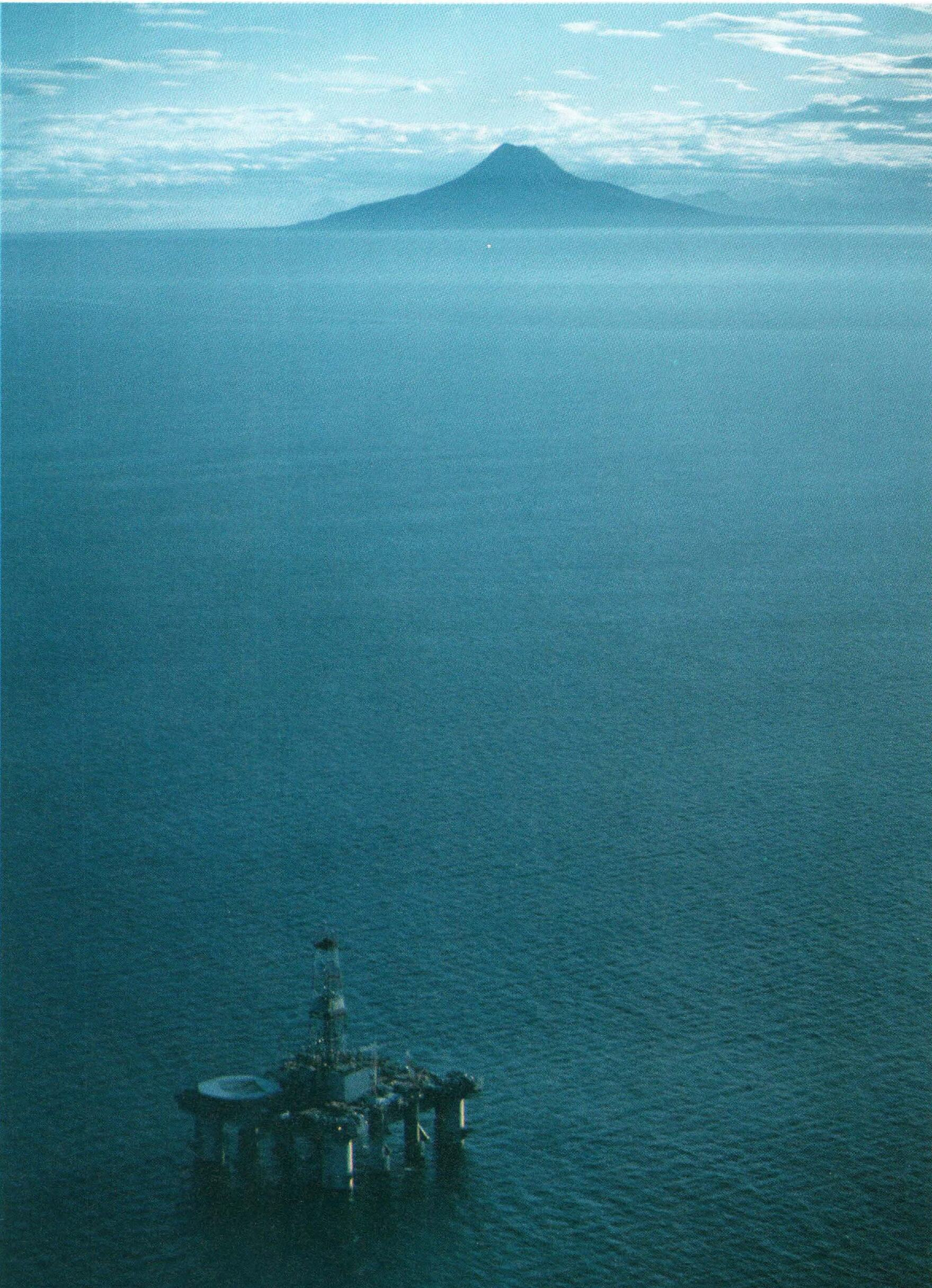
- Ocean Ranger drilling in the Cook Inlet

History
- Name: Ocean Ranger
- Owner: ODECO
- Operator: ODECO
- Builder: Mitsubishi Heavy Industries' Yard in Hiroshima, Japan
- Yard number: 615641
- Launched: 1976
- Christened: 1976
- Completed: 1976
- Maiden voyage: 1976
- In service: 1976–1982
- Out of service: 15 February 1982
- Identification: IMO number: 8767202
- Fate: Sank with all hands due to storm

General characteristics
- Class & type: semi-submersible mobile offshore drilling unit
- Tonnage: 25,000
- Length: 396 ft (121 m)
- Beam: 262 ft (80 m)
- Height: 337 ft (103 m)
- Decks: 2
- Installed power: 7000 hp
- Propulsion: 2 x 3500HP DC Electric motors providing propulsion to 2 Steerable Kort Nozzles
- Capacity: 100
- Crew: 84
- Notes: raised and sunk in deeper waters

Ocean Ranger was a semi-submersible mobile oil platform that sank in Canadian waters on 15 February 1982. It was drilling an exploration well on the Grand Banks of Newfoundland, 267 kilometres (166 mi) east of St. John's, Newfoundland, for Mobil Oil of Canada, Ltd. (MOCAN) with 84 crew members on board when it sank. There were no survivors.

Refloated in 1983 due to its wreck posing a hazard to shipping, Ocean Ranger was towed to deeper water and sunk again. Three divers died in the operation, bringing the total loss of life from the sinking to 87. The loss of the platform led to numerous lawsuits against the owners, which were eventually settled out of court for a grand total of $20 million, and changes in operation and safety standards were enacted to prevent similar disasters in the future.

== History and design ==
Ocean Ranger was designed and owned by Ocean Drilling and Exploration Company, Inc. (ODECO) of New Orleans. The vessel was a self-propelled large semi-submersible design with a drilling facility and living quarters. It was capable of operation beneath 1,500 feet (460 m) of ocean water and could drill to a maximum depth of 25,000 feet (7,600 m). It was described by ODECO as the world's largest semi-submersible oil rig to date.

Constructed for ODECO in 1976 by Mitsubishi Heavy Industries in Hiroshima, Japan, Ocean Ranger was 396 feet (121 m) long, 262 feet (80 m) wide, and 337 feet (103 m) high. It had twelve 45,000-pound (20,000 kg) anchors. The weight was 25,000 tons. It was floating on two 400-foot (120 m) long pontoons that rested 79 feet (24 m) below the surface.

The vessel was approved for 'unrestricted ocean operations' and designed to withstand extremely harsh conditions at sea, including 100-knot (190 km/h) winds and 110-foot (34 m) waves. Prior to moving to the Grand Banks area in November 1980, it had operated off the coasts of Alaska, New Jersey and Ireland.

== Sinking ==
On 26 November 1981, Ocean Ranger commenced drilling well J-34, its third well in the Hibernia Oil Field. Ocean Ranger was still working on this well in February 1982 when the incident occurred. Two other semi-submersible platforms were also drilling nearby: Sedco 706, 8.5 miles (13.7 km) NNE, and Zapata Ugland, 19.2 miles (30.9 km) N of Ocean Ranger. On 14 February 1982, the platforms received reports of an approaching storm linked to a major Atlantic hurricane from NORDCO Ltd, the company responsible for issuing offshore weather forecasts. The usual method of preparing for bad weather involved hanging-off the drill pipe at the sub-sea wellhead and disconnecting the riser from the sub-sea blowout preventer. Due to surface difficulties and the speed at which the storm developed, the crew of Ocean Ranger was forced to shear the drill pipe after hanging-off, after which they disconnected the riser in the early evening.

At about 19:00 local time, the nearby Sedco 706 experienced a large rogue wave which damaged some items on deck and caused the loss of a life raft. Soon after, radio transmissions were heard from Ocean Ranger, describing a broken portlight (a porthole window) and water in the ballast control room, with discussions on how best to repair the damage. Ocean Ranger reported experiencing storm seas of 55 feet (17 m), with the odd wave up to 65 feet (20 m), thus leaving the unprotected portlight at 28 feet (8.5 m) above the water line vulnerable to wave damage. Some time after 21:00, radio conversations originating on Ocean Ranger were heard on Sedco 706 and Zapata Ugland, noting that valves on Ocean Ranger's ballast control panel appeared to be opening and closing of their own accord. The radio conversations also discussed the 100-knot (190 km/h) winds and waves up to 65 feet (20 m) high. Through the remainder of the evening, routine radio traffic passed between Ocean Ranger, its neighboring rigs and their individual support boats. Nothing out of the ordinary was noted.

At 00:52 local time, on 15 February, a mayday call was sent out from Ocean Ranger, noting a severe list to the port side of the rig and requesting immediate assistance. This was the first communication from Ocean Ranger identifying a major problem. The standby vessel, the M/V Seaforth Highlander, was requested to come in close as countermeasures against the 10–15-degree list were proving ineffective. The onshore MOCAN supervisor was notified of the situation, and the Canadian Forces and Mobil-operated helicopters were alerted just after 01:00 local time. The M/V Boltentor and the M/V Nordertor, the standby boats of Sedco 706 and Zapata Ugland respectively, were also dispatched to Ocean Ranger to provide assistance. At 01:30 local time, Ocean Ranger transmitted its last message: "There will be no further radio communications from Ocean Ranger. We are going to lifeboat stations." Shortly thereafter, in the middle of the night and in the midst of severe winter weather, the crew abandoned the platform. The platform remained afloat for another 90 minutes, sinking between 03:07 and 03:13 local time.

All of Ocean Ranger sank beneath the Atlantic: by the next morning all that remained was a few buoys. Her entire complement of 84 workers – 46 Mobil employees and 38 contractors from various service companies – were killed. While the rig was provided with an Emergency Procedures Manual which detailed evacuation procedures, it is unclear how effectively the platform evacuation was carried out. There is evidence that at least one lifeboat was successfully launched with up to 36 crew inside, and witnesses on the M/V Seaforth Highlander reported seeing at least 20 crew members in the water at the same time, indicating that at least 56 crew successfully evacuated the rig. The United States Coast Guard report speculated that 'these men either chose to enter the water directly or were thrown into the water as a result of unsuccessful lifesaving equipment launching'. Rescue attempts by the standby vessels were hampered by the adverse weather conditions and the conclusion that the standby boats were neither equipped nor configured to rescue casualties from a cold sea. The lifeboat capsized during an attempt to tether it to the Seaforth Highlander, throwing the men on board into the water, and an emergency raft launched as a last resort missed the men. As a result of the severe weather, the first helicopter did not arrive on scene until 02:30 local time, by which time most if not all of Ocean Ranger's crew had succumbed to hypothermia and drowned. Over the next week, 22 bodies were recovered from the North Atlantic. Autopsies indicated that those men had died as a result of drowning while in a hypothermic state.

In related activity the following day, the Soviet container ship Mekhanik Tarasov was struck by the same weather conditions as Ocean Ranger, approximately 65 miles (105 km) to the east. The battered Soviet freighter listed dramatically for hours before sinking with the loss of 32 of 37 crew.

== Causes and effects ==
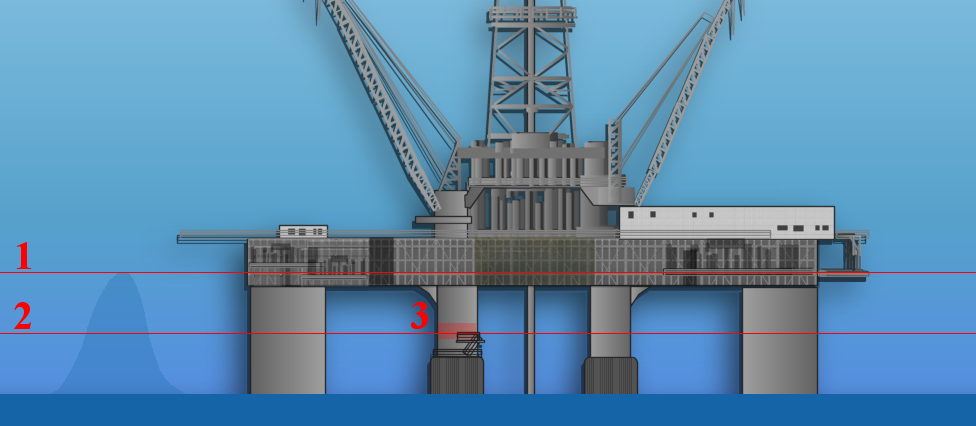
Ocean Ranger's vulnerability to a rogue wave illustrated. 1 – For comparison, the Draupner wave 59 ft/18 m 2 – 28 ft/8.5 m 3 – Location of the ballast control room

The remains of the platform were found by sonar search over the following weeks, resting in an inverted position approximately 485 feet (148 m) south-east of the wellhead, surrounded by major items of debris such as the derrick. The platform had capsized bow-first, turning over and striking the sea floor with the forward ends of the platform's pontoons. The United States Coast Guard Marine Board of Investigation report on the disaster summarised the chain of events as follows:

- A large wave appeared to cause a broken portlight;
- The broken portlight allowed the ingress of sea water into the ballast control room;
- The ballast control panel malfunctioned or appeared to malfunction to the crew;
- As a result of this malfunction or perceived malfunction, several valves in the platform's ballast control system opened due to a short circuit, or were manually opened by the crew;
- Ocean Ranger assumed a forward list;
- As a result of the forward list, boarding seas began flooding the forward chain lockers located in the forward corner support columns;
- The forward list worsened;
- The pumping of the forward tanks was not possible using the usual ballast control method as the magnitude of the forward list created a vertical distance between the forward tanks and the ballast pumps located astern that exceeded the suction available on the ballast system's pumps;
- Detailed instructions and personnel trained in the use of the ballast control panel were not available;
- At some point, the crew blindly attempted to manually operate the ballast control panel using brass control rods;
- At some point, the manually operated sea valves in both pontoons were closed;
- Progressive flooding of the chain lockers and subsequent flooding of the upper deck resulted in a loss of buoyancy great enough to cause the platform to capsize.

A Canadian Royal Commission spent two years looking into the disaster. The joint Federal-Provincial Royal Commission on the Ocean Ranger Marine Disaster found that the crew were not trained, the safety equipment was inadequate, there were no safety protocols for the supply ship, and that the platform itself had a number of flaws. The Royal Commission concluded that Ocean Ranger had design and construction flaws, particularly in the ballast control room, and that the crew lacked proper safety training, survival suits and equipment. The Royal Commission also concluded that inspection and regulation by United States and Canadian government agencies was ineffective. In addition to key recommendations for Canada's offshore oil and gas industry, the commission recommended that the federal government invest annually in research and development for search and rescue technologies, such as improving the design of lifesaving equipment—a commitment that has been met in every fiscal year since 1982.

== Aftermath ==
In August 1983, the wreck of Ocean Ranger was refloated and sunk in deeper waters by the Dutch firm Wijsmuller Salvage. Since its sinking the previous year, concerns over the wreck's position had been made by the federal government. As the wreck of Ocean Ranger was situated at an approximate 30 metres below the water, the wreck posed a danger to shipping. The operation saw Ocean Ranger towed upside down with her two pontoons breaking the surface.

Operations had commenced earlier in June. However progress was halted when two salvage divers were killed on the wreck by an underwater explosion on 20 June. A stop-work order on refloating the wreck was declared and an investigation into the incident followed. However, exploratory diving was allowed to continue. A second incident on 26 June saw a third diver killed, believed to have been hit by a dropped object as he attempted to return to the surface.

Lawsuits arising from the sinking were settled out of court with a package cumulatively valued at $20 million.

A permanent monument to those who died was created on the grounds of the Confederation Building, the seat of the provincial government of Newfoundland.

Canadian playwright Joan MacLeod's first play Jewel (1987) is about the widow of one of the men who drowned in the disaster. It premiered at the Tarragon in 1987 (dir. Andy McKim), and was subsequently produced for radio in English, French, German, Danish, and Swedish.

A documentary film, The Ocean Ranger Disaster (2002), was released only in Canada. In fiction, Canadian author Lisa Moore's novel, February (2009), depicts the life of a woman whose husband died aboard the oil rig. Canadian folk singer-songwriter Ron Hynes wrote a song called "Atlantic Blue" (1988) as a tribute to the crew of Ocean Ranger.

In 2009, a non-fiction book, Rig: An Oral History of the Ocean Ranger Disaster, written by Mike Heffernan, was published by Breakwater Books.

In January 2012, a non-fiction book, The Ocean Ranger: Remaking the Promise of Oil, was published in Canada by Fernwood Publishing. The book's author, Susan Dodd, lost her older brother Jim with the sinking of the Ocean Ranger and watched, for years, as her parents pursued legal struggles with the oil companies.

== See also ==
- Alexander L. Kielland
- Deepwater Horizon explosion
- Piper Alpha
