= Yakovlev Yak-35 =

Soviet jet fighter-bomber project

Yak-35MV

General information
- Type: Strategic bomber
- National origin: Soviet Union
- Manufacturer: OKB-115 / Yakovlev

History
- First flight: not flown

The Yakovlev Yak-35MV was a low-altitude tactical fighter / interceptor project of the Soviet Union from the late 1950s, which suffered from a lack of funding, in the wake of the expected total reliance on guided missiles in the near future. In addition to financial problems, the engines were found to be under-developed and the project failed to progress further than the drawing board.

== Design and development ==
The initial design was for a single-engined low-altitude interceptor for interceptions between 200 and 10,000 m (660 and 32,810 ft).This was refined to a twin-engined tactical fighter-bomber with a take-off weight of 15,000 kg (33,000 lb), carrying a weapon load of 2,000 kg (4,400 lb).

== Specifications (Yak-35MV estimated) ==
Data from OKB Yakovlev

General characteristics

- Crew: 1
- Gross weight: 15,000 kg (33,069 lb)
- Powerplant: 2 × Tumansky R-11AF-300 afterburning turbojet engines

Performance

- Maximum speed: 1,500 km/h (930 mph, 810 kn) to 1,600 km/h (990 mph; 860 kn) at 1,000 m (3,300 ft)
- Service ceiling: 10,000 m (33,000 ft)

Armament
2,000 kg (4,400 lb) weapons Avionics
Vozdookh-1 GCI system
