= FCM 50t =

- Type: Heavy tank
- Place of origin: France

Production history
- Manufacturer: Forges et Chantiers de la Méditerranée (FCM)

Specifications
- Mass: 54.24 metric tonnes
- Length: 8.19 m (26 ft 10 in)
- Width: 3.57 m (11 ft 9 in)
- Height: 3.02 m (9 ft 11 in)
- Crew: 5
- Armor: 120 mm (4.7 in)
- Main armament: Canon de 90 mm SA mle. 1945
- Secondary armament: 1 x 7.5 mm coaxial machine gun and 1 x 7.5 mm hull machine gun
- Engine: Maybach HL 295 12VC; 1,000 hp (750 kW)
- Power/weight: 7.6 hp/t
- Suspension: torsion bar
- Operational range: 340 km (210 mi)
- Maximum speed: 51–60 km/h (32–37 mph)

The FCM 50t was a French heavy tank design of the 1940s. It did not progress beyond drawing stage.

== Development ==
After the end of the Second World War, the French Army was in pressing need of a modern tank with heavy armament to replace the - now obsolete - war reparations German Panther medium tank and the French ARL 44 heavy tank then in service. In March 1945, French industry was invited to design a more satisfactory tank which resulted in the AMX-50.

In December 1945, the FCM 50t was designed by Forges et Chantiers de la Méditerranée (FCM) as a direct competitor to the AMX design. It did not progress past the drawing board

== Description ==
The FCM 50t bears strong resemblance to the Panther tank. The FCM 50t turret resembles the Tiger II's turret.

The suspension is made up of 80 cm diameter single and double interposed roller supplemented with return rollers. The suspension is oleo-pneumatic. The drive sprockets are located at the rear. The 65 cm wide tracks are similar to those of the Char B1 bis or the ARL 44. For rail transport, the tracks would have been replaced temporarily by 37 cm wide tracks.

A Canon de 90 mm SA mle. 1945 gun was to be mounted on the FCM 50t.

=== Fording ===
The tank can cross a ford up to 1.50m (waterproof up to 1.82m). For deep water crossings (up to 4 – 5 meters), a cover plate fitted with a snorkel is fixed on the engine deck.

=== Other accessories ===
A 2000 liters tank trailer offers the possibility of doubling the range of the tank. A supply device directly connects the tank to the tank. The trailer can be released from inside the tank.

The design of the body, with a ground clearance of 0.50m and a running gear composed of separate and independent elements, contributes passively to mine protection. Active mine protection, composed of accessory rollers that can be mounted at the front of the tank, makes it possible to detonate mines on the passage of the machine.
