= ODECO =

Defunct offshore drilling company

Ocean Drilling & Exploration Company
- Industry: Petroleum industry
- Founded: 1953; 73 years ago
- Founder: Alden J. "Doc" Laborde; John Hayward
- Defunct: 1992; 34 years ago
- Fate: Acquired by Diamond Offshore Drilling
- Headquarters: New Orleans

ODECO (Ocean Drilling & Exploration Company) was an offshore drilling company. In 1992, it was acquired by Diamond Offshore Drilling.

== History ==
In 1953, the company was founded by Alden J. "Doc" Laborde, who also founded Tidewater, and John Hayward. Hayward was the builder of the Barnsdall rig and holder of the patent on submersible drilling barge methodology. Charles Murphy Jr. of Murphy Oil invested $500,000 in the company and assisted Laborde in finding additional investors.

Alexander Shipyard in New Orleans constructed the company's first rig, which was delivered in 1954 and immediately contracted to Shell Oil. The rig was named Mr.Charlie after Charles Murphy. Mr. Charlie was retired in 1986.

After noticing the stability of submersible rigs when they were only partially submerged for relocation and the success of Shell's conversion of the Blue Water rig, Laborde designed and constructed the first purpose-built V-shaped semi-submersible drilling rig, Ocean Driller, delivered in 1963.

In 1982, Ocean Ranger, one of the company's oil platforms, sank in a violent storm in Canadian waters east of Newfoundland, killing 84 people.

Also in 1982, the company took delivery of Odyssey. The rig suffered a blowout in 1988.

In 1991, Murphy Oil acquired the company.

In 1992, Diamond Offshore Drilling acquired the company from Murphy Oil for $358 million.
