= Tupolev ANT-30 =

1930s Soviet reconnaissance aircraft

Tupolev SK-1

General information
- Type: Reconnaissance/strike aircraft
- National origin: Soviet Union
- Manufacturer: Tupolev Design Bureau
- Status: paper project only
- Primary user: Red Air Force (intended)
- Number built: 0

The Tupolev ANT-30 was a mid-1930s project for a reconnaissance/strike 'cruiser-type' aircraft by the Tupolev Design Bureau.

== Development and design ==
In 1933–1934, the VVS announced a requirement for a 2-engine multirole aircraft of the 'air cruiser' class, building upon the concepts incorporated in the R-6 and MI-3. According to the draft, the ANT-30 was to be carried out according to the scheme of an all-metal twin-engine aircraft with a smooth skin and normal tail. When considering possible projects, special attention was paid to the effectiveness of offensive and defensive small arms and cannon weapons. A firing point with two ShKAS machine guns was located in the anterior ascending domed installation; In the fuselage cargo compartment in the "cruiser" version, there was an additional fuel tank; The total bomb load reached 1000 kg.

The Air Force made ANT-30 aircraft TTT, carried out aerodynamic calculations, made models, prepared design documentation for the construction of a prototype, and pilot production began. But all the works were gradually curtailed at the end of 1933 - at the beginning of 1934, at this point the technical readiness of the ANT-30 was estimated at 16%. The reason was the decision to switch to a more promising type of aircraft - ANT-40 (SB), as well as the gradual withering away of the concept of a universal cruiser type aircraft.
