= Caproni Ca.356 =

Italian WWII reconnaissance aircraft

General information
- Type: Reconnaissance
- National origin: Italy
- Manufacturer: IMAM
- Status: paper project

The Caproni Ca.356 was a proposed reconnaissance aircraft developed by the Italian company IMAM in the early forties. It was intended to replace the IMAM Ro.37, and would have been powered by two 1,250 hp Isotta Fraschini Zeta R.C.42 engines, with a wingspan of 65.6 feet (20 meters).
