= CBT BQM-1BR =

Brazilian unmanned aerial vehicle

BQM-1 BR
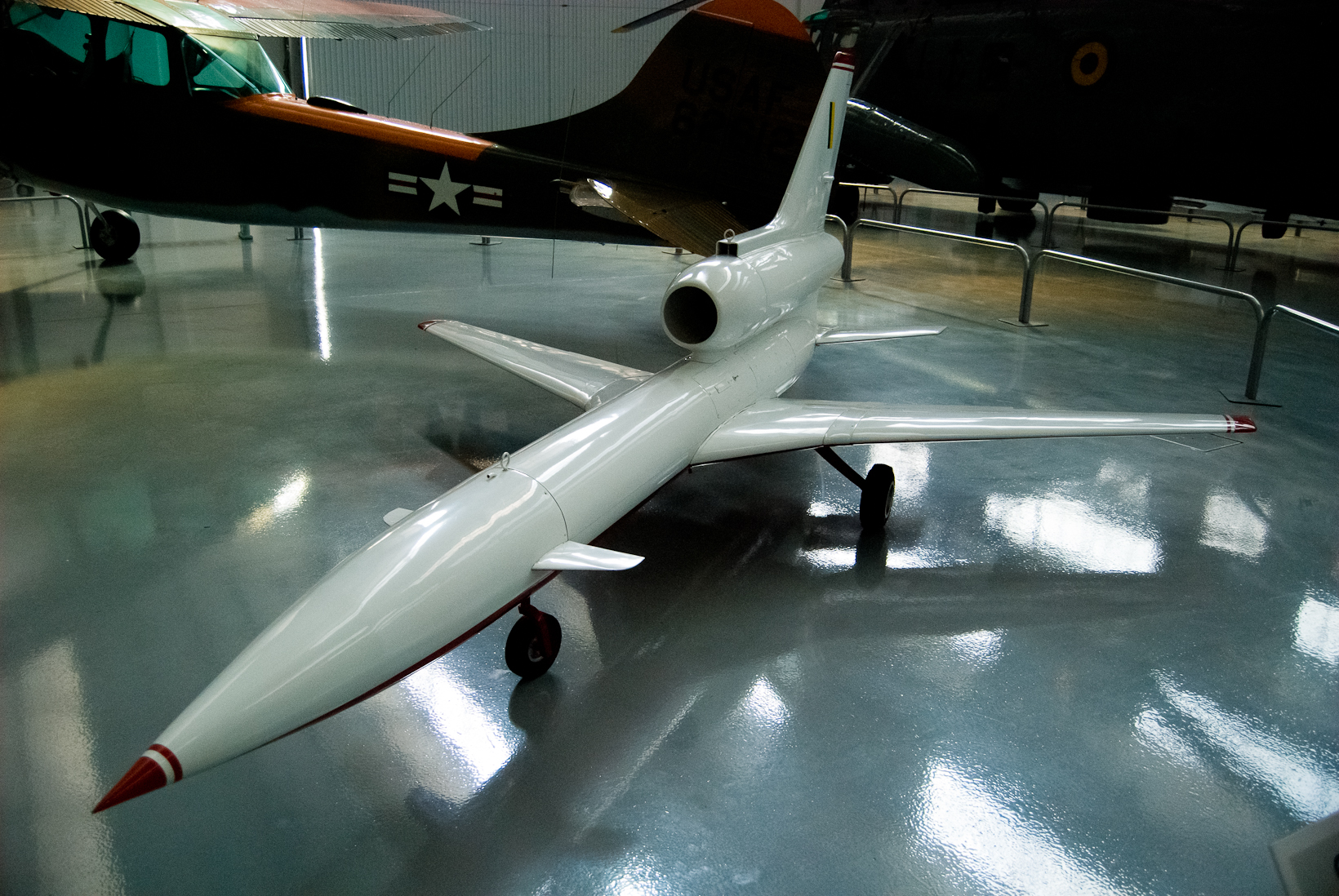

General information
- Type: Unmanned aerial vehicle
- National origin: Brazil
- Manufacturer: Companhia Brasileira de Tratores
- Number built: 2

History
- First flight: 1983

The BQM-1BR was a Brazilian unmanned aerial vehicle designed and built locally by Companhia Brasileira de Tratores for several kinds of sensing roles.

== Design and development ==
The BQM-1 BR was the first remotely controlled vehicle built in Brazil by the Companhia Brasileira de Tratores (CBT) in partnership with the Department of Aerospace Science and Technology. It was developed for military and civilian use, with versions for reconnaissance, attack, and crop-dusting. The wings had 3° dihedral. 4° of incidence, and were swept 33° over most of the span, increasing to 55" at the root. It was built using a conventional semi-monocoque fuselage, with circular root cross-section, fixed incidence caudal plane cantilever, with 5°.dihedral and 30° leading edge sweep. It used a turbojet engine produced nationally by CBT, mounted in a nacelle on top of the rear fuselage, serving as the base of its horizontal stabilizing fin.

A first batch of 20 units of this model were planned by the Brazilian Air Force. However, due to economic and political factors in Brazil, the project was abandoned.

== Specifications ==
Data from Taylor 1986, p. 810

General characteristics

- Length: 3.89 m (12 ft 9 in)
- Wingspan: 3.18 m (10 ft 5 in)
- Height: 1.28 m (4 ft 2 in)
- Empty weight: 61 kg (134 lb)
- Max takeoff weight: 90.25 kg (199 lb)
- Powerplant: 1 × Tietê JT2 single-stage jet-engine, 0.300 kN (67.5 lbf) thrust

Performance

- Maximum speed: 560 km/h (350 mph, 300 kn)
- Service ceiling: 6,000 m (20,000 ft)
