= Balmoral oil field =

Oil field located in United Kingdom

- Location within North Sea
- Country: United Kingdom
- Region: North Sea
- Location/block: 16/21
- Offshore/onshore: offshore
- Coordinates: 58.2292°N 1.1086°E
- Operators: Sun Oil (1986-2004), Canadian Natural Resources (2004-07), Premier Oil (from 2007)
- Owner: see text

Field history
- Discovery: August 1975
- Start of production: 1986
- Peak of production: 1987
- Abandonment: 2020

Production
- Estimated oil in place: 68 million barrels (~8.9×10^{6} t)
- Recoverable oil (million tonnes): 13.33
- Producing formations: Upper Paleocene and Devonian sandstones

The Balmoral oil field is a depleted crude oil field in the UK sector of the central North Sea, 225 km north-east of Aberdeen. Oil was produced from the field reservoir by the Balmoral Floating Production Vessel (FPV) between 1986 and 2020. The Balmoral FPV also processed oil from six minor oil fields in the area. Oil production from the field has ceased.

== The field ==
The Balmoral oil field is located in Block 16/21 of the UK North Sea continental shelf. The field was discovered in August 1975; the oil reservoir comprises Upper Paleocene and Devonian sandstones at a depth of 7,000 feet (2,100 metres). The reservoir and its fluids have the following characteristics:

Balmoral reservoir and fluids
Parameter	Value
API gravity	39.9°API
Porosity	17-28%
Permeability	3,300 md
Sulfur	Nil
Initial recoverable reserves	68 million barrels, 13.33 million tonnes

== Owners and operators ==
The joint venture owners of the field in 1994 were Sun Oil Britain Ltd (62.0%), Deminex UK Oil and Gas Ltd (15.0%), Clyde Expro plc (15.0%), Pentex Oil Limited (8.0%). Sun Oil operated the Balmoral field. In 2004 Canadian Natural Resources (CNR) acquired a 70.2% interest in the field; in 2007 Oilexco acquired the stake from CNR; in 2009 Premier Oil E&P UK Ltd acquired Oilexco and Premier Oil becomes the operator of the Balmoral field.

== Development ==
The Balmoral field was developed by a single custom built integrated production and accommodation semi-submersible vessel. The principal design data of the Balmoral FPV was as follows.

Balmoral FPV design data
Coordinates	58.229186N 1.108617E
Water depth	143–147 metres
Type	Purpose-built semisubmersible GVA 5000
Function	Production and accommodation
FPV design and fabrication	Gotaverken Arendal, Gothenburg; Highland Fabricators, Nigg
Topsides design	Bectel Great Britain Ltd
Displacement	33,000 tonnes
Anchoring	8 point, 4 thrusters
Accommodation	120 crew
Well slots	14 on template + other remote
Wells	12 production, 6 water injection
Oil throughput	65,000 barrels per day
Oil storage	None
Water injection	100,000 barrels per day
FPV installed	1986
Production started	November 1986
Oil production to	Brae-Forties trunk line via 14.5 km 14-inch pipeline
Gas production to	On board fuel gas and lift gas, excess flared

Small oil fields in the vicinity of Balmoral were developed with subsea wellheads. Well fluids were transported by pipeline from the wells to the Balmoral FPV for treatment and export.

Small oil fields producing to Balmoral
Field	Beauly	Brenda	Burghley	Glamis	Nichol	Stirling
Location	16/21	15/25b	16/22	1621	15/25a	16/21
Reservoir	Paleocene sands	Paleocene sands	Paleocene sands	Late Jurassic	Paleocene sands	Devonian sandstone
Owners	Talisman; Repsol Sinopec	Oilexco Inc; Premier Oil E&P UK	Talisman; Repsol Sinopec	Premier Oil E&P UK	Oilexco Inc; Premier Oil E&P UK	Premier Oil E&P UK
Wells	1	5	1	3	1	5
First oil	2000	2007	2010	1987	2007	1995
Peak production	10,000 bpd	30,000 bpd	1,300 bpd	10,200		
Production to	9.3 km pipeline to Balmoral	8 km pipeline to Balmoral	17.3 km pipeline to Balmoral	4.7 km pipeline to Balmoral	9.5 km pipeline to Brenda	11.1 km pipeline to Balmoral

=== Processing plant ===
Oil from the wellheads was routed to two stages of 3-phase (oil, gas, water) separators where gas and water were removed. Oil was metered and pumped via a 14.5 km 14-inch diameter flexible riser and pipeline to a tie-in on the Brae–Forties trunk line and thence to Cruden Bay.

The peak production from Balmoral was 1.71 million tonnes per year in 1987. In 1991 the production rate was 35,000 bpd.

Gas from the separators was compressed and used as fuel gas and lift gas for a number of wells.

Water injection facilities for up to 100,000 bpd were provided to maintain reservoir pressure through six injection wells.

== Decommissioning ==
A Cessation of Production application was received from the Oil and Gas Authority on 23 April 2018. Premier Oil prepared a decommissioning plan. Production from Balmoral ceased on 28 November 2020. The FPV was flushed to remove hydrocarbon. It was removed from the field in May 2021 and was taken to Denmark for dismantling and recycling of materials.
