= Vertebrae bend restrictor =

A Vertebrae Bend Restrictor (VBR) is used in the oil and gas industry as part of offshore deep sea drilling operations. It is designed to prevent damage to an umbilical cable from overbending. It offsets the action of applied loads which could kink or buckle the internal conduits of an umbilical, cable, flexible riser pipe or MUX line.

Most people in the subsea industry have never seen a VBR break during testing or regular use, but manufacturers of VBRs occasionally test VBR assemblies to ultimate failure.

== Companies that Manufacture VBRs ==
- EXSTO
- Matrix Composites & Engineering
- UW-Elast
- Lankhorst
- ABCO Subsea
- Pipeline Engineering
- Whitefield Plastics
- Trelleborg Offshore
- Bardot Group
- Utex Industries, Inc.

== Companies that Design VBRs ==
- DGDG-EU
