= Transocean Marianas =

Semi-submersible drilling vessel

History
- Name: Transocean Marianas; P. Portia (1996–1998); Polyportia (1994–1996); Tharos (1979–1994)
- Owner: Transocean
- Operator: Transocean
- Port of registry: Marshall Islands, Majuro; United Kingdom, Aberdeen 1995-1996
- Builder: Mitsubishi Heavy Industries
- Laid down: 13 August 1978
- Acquired: 1 September 1979
- Identification: Call sign: V7HC5; ABS class no: 7904130; DNV ID: 28301; IMO number: 8757960; MMSI no.: 538002209
- Fate: Scrapped September 2018

General characteristics
- Class & type: American Bureau of Shipping: A1 column stabilized MODU; AMS; ACCU; DP S2
- Tonnage: 20,461 GT; 6,138 NT; 10,100 DWT
- Length: 91.44 m (300.0 ft)
- Beam: 75.8952 m (249.000 ft)
- Draught: Operating: 25 m (82 ft); Transit: 9 m (30 ft)
- Depth: 34.7472 m (114.000 ft)
- Deck clearance: 12,352 mm (40.525 ft)
- Propulsion: 6 x Electro-Motive Diesel MD-20 3,600hp
- Speed: 2.0 kts
- Capacity: Liquid mud: 1,589 m^{3} (56,100 cu ft); Drill water: 1,734 m^{3} (61,200 cu ft); Potable water: 465 m^{3} (16,400 cu ft); Fuel oil: 2,941 m^{3} (103,900 cu ft); Bulk mud: 221 m^{3} (7,800 cu ft); Bulk cement: 221 m^{3} (7,800 cu ft)
- Crew: 150

Transocean Marianas was an Earl & Wright Sedco 700 design semi-submersible platform drilling unit capable of operating in harsh environments and water depths up to 7,000 feet (2,100 m) using a 47.6 cm (18.75 in), 15,000 psi blowout preventer (BOP), and a 53 cm (21 in) outside diameter (OD) marine riser.

Transocean Marianas has operated under several names: Tharos from 1979 to 1994, Polyportia from 1994 to 1996, and P. Portia from 1996 to 1998.

On October 7, 2009, it began drilling on the Macondo well in the Gulf of Mexico. On November 9, 2009. it was damaged by Hurricane Ida. It was subsequently replaced by the Deepwater Horizon, which was responsible for the Deepwater Horizon oil spill when that rig exploded on April 20, 2010.

== Piper Alpha incident ==
In 1988, as Tharos, the vessel operated by Occidental Consortium as a large firefighting, construction, diving support and accommodation vessel equipped with a helicopter and a hospital ship with 22 beds, that rescued survivors from the Piper Alpha oil platform disaster. The vessel carried out firefighting on the night of the disaster and supported the fire fighting and well kill operations that led to the extinguishing of the blaze. However, flaws in the design of the vessel's extensible rescue arm prevented it from rescuing crew from the platform, while errors in the operation of the water cannon delayed their use. Divers from Tharos recovered many bodies from the seabed and from the galley area of Piper Alpha. Tharos's role in the early hours of the disaster was shown in the 1990 Scottish Television series Rescue.

== 2011 Ghana incident ==
On July 6, 2011, Transocean Marianas was evacuated due to taking on water off the coast of Ghana.

== Disposal ==
In September 2017 Transocean announced that Transocean Marianas, along with five other laid up rigs, would be retired and disposed of for recycling.
