= Semi-submersible platform =

Marine vessel used in offshore roles with good stability and seakeeping

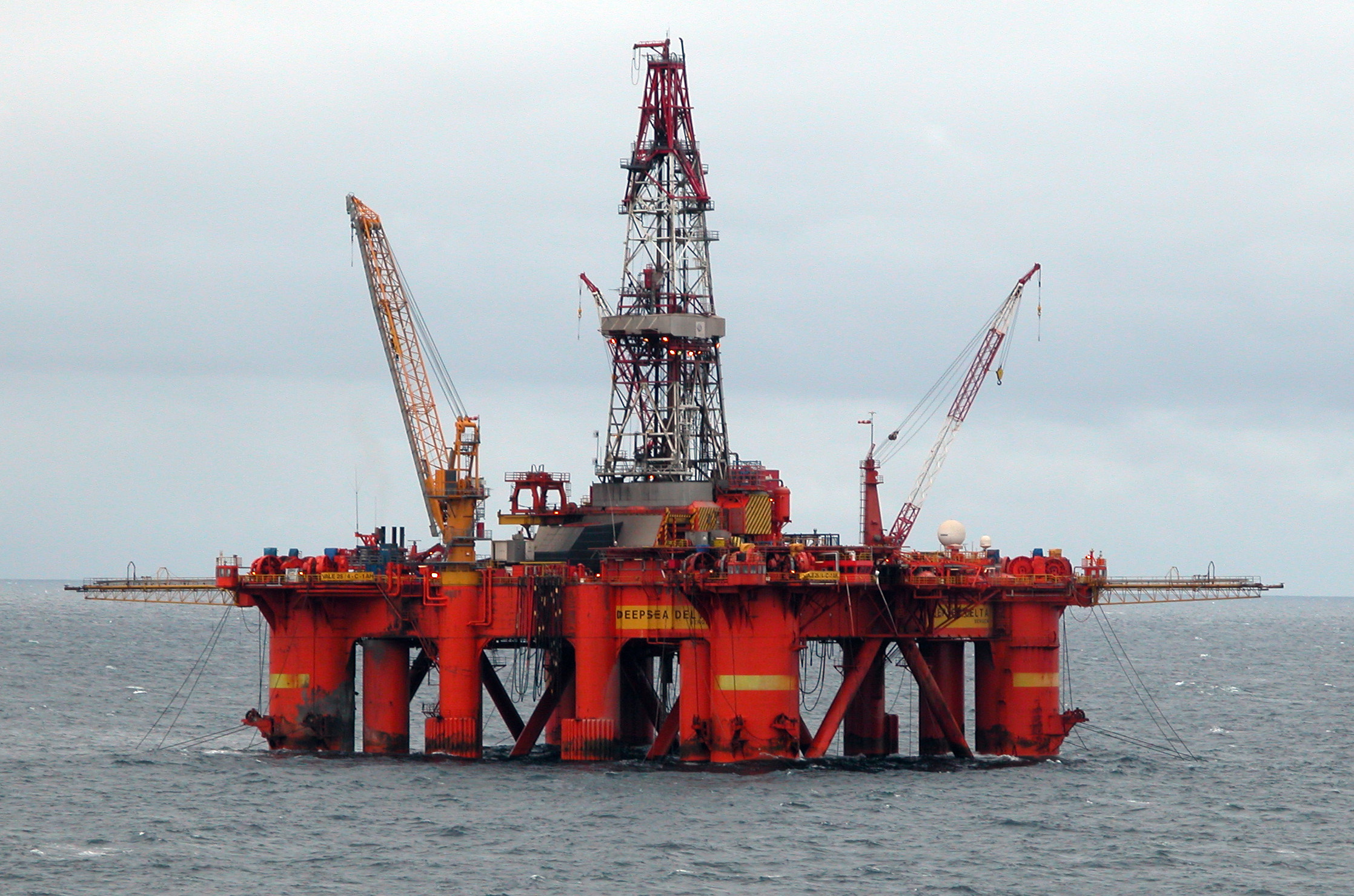
Deepsea Delta semi-submersible drilling rig in the North Sea

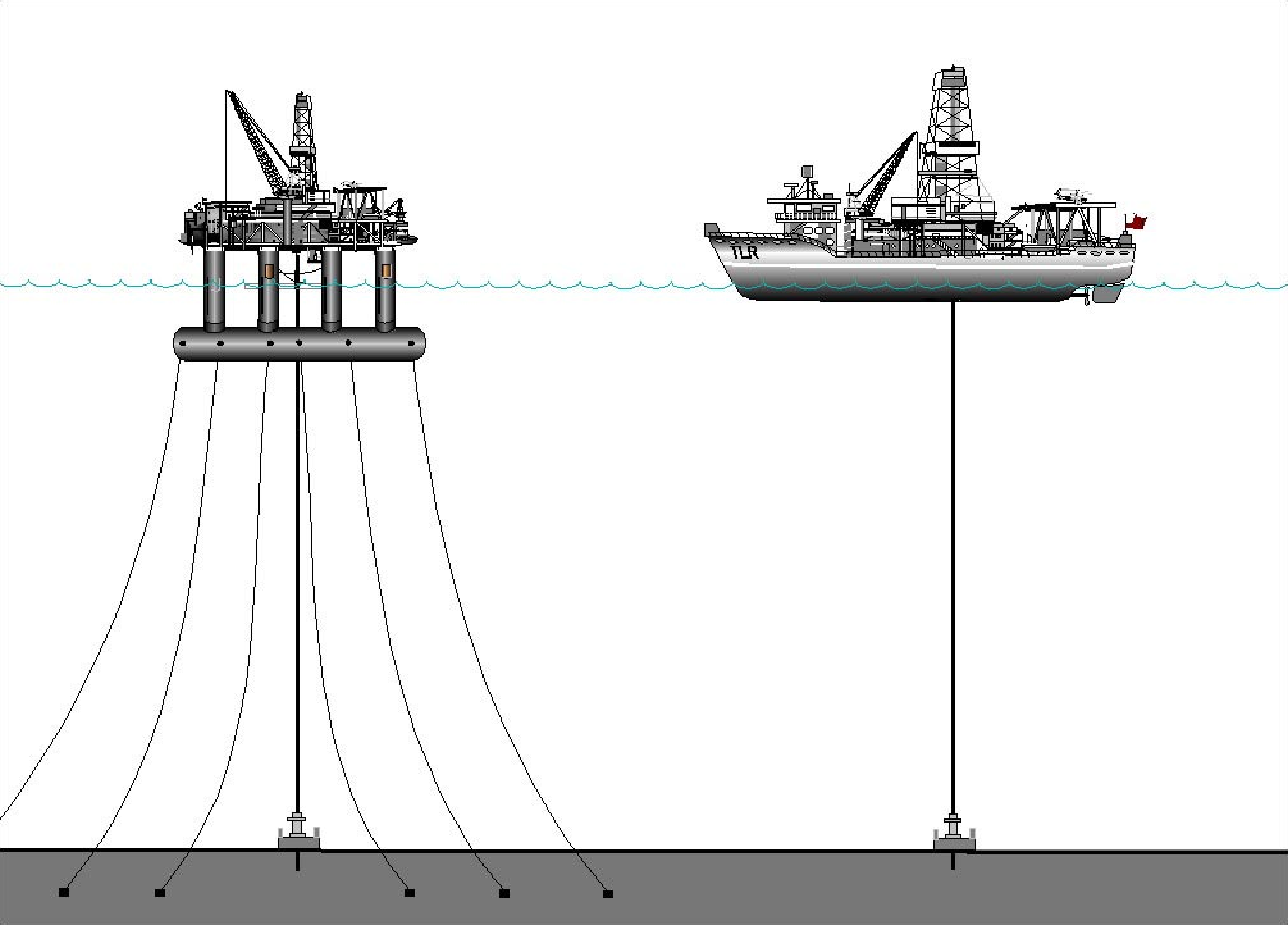
Comparison of deepwater semi-submersible (left) and drillship (right)

A semi-submersible platform is a specialised marine vessel used in offshore roles including as offshore drilling rigs, safety vessels, oil production platforms, and heavy lift cranes. They have good ship stability and seakeeping, better than drillships.

== Characteristics ==
Offshore drilling in water depth greater than around 520 metres (1,710 ft) requires that operations be carried out from a floating vessel, since fixed structures are not practical. Initially in the early 1950s monohull ships such as CUSS I were used, but these were found to have significant heave, pitch and yaw motions in large waves, and the industry needed more stable drilling platforms.

A semi-submersible obtains most of its buoyancy from ballasted, watertight pontoons located below the ocean surface and wave action. Structural columns connect the pontoons and operating deck. The operating deck can be located high above the sea level owing to the good ship stability of the design, and therefore is kept well away from the waves.

With its hull structure submerged at a deep draft, the semi-submersible is less affected by wave loadings than a normal ship. With a small water-plane area, however, the semi-submersible is sensitive to load changes, and therefore must have their onboard mass trimmed to maintain stability. Unlike a submersible, a semi-submersible vessel is not supported by resting on the seabed.

Semi-submersible vessels are able to transform from a deep to a shallow draft by deballasting (removing ballast water from the hull), thereby becoming surface vessels. Usually they are moved from location to location in this configuration. The heavy lift vessels use this capability to submerge the majority of their structure, locate beneath another floating vessel, and then deballast to pick up the other vessel as a cargo.

== Early history ==
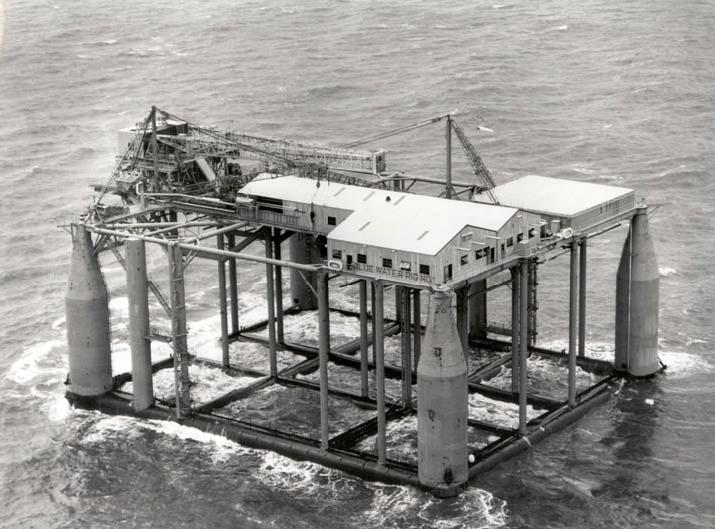
Blue Water Rig No. 1

The semi-submersible design was first developed for oil platform activities in the early 1960s. Bruce Collipp of Shell is regarded as the inventor.

However, Edward Robert Armstrong may have paved the way with his idea of "seadrome" landing strips for airplanes in the late 1920s, since his idea involved the same use of columns on ballast tanks below the surface and anchored to the ocean floor by steel cables.

The first jackup rigs, for shallow waters, was built in 1954.

The first semisubmersible arrived by accident in 1961. Blue Water Drilling Company owned and operated the four column submersible drilling rig Blue Water Rig No.1 in the Gulf of Mexico for Shell Oil Company. As the pontoons were not sufficiently buoyant to support the weight of the rig and its consumables, it was towed between locations at a draught midway between the top of the pontoons and the underside of the deck. It was observed that the motions at this draught were very small, and Blue Water Drilling and Shell jointly decided that the rig could be operated in the floating mode.

The first purpose built drilling semi-submersible Ocean Driller was launched in 1963.

By 1972, there were 30 semi-submersible units.

== Classification ==
Drilling rig construction has historically occurred in boom periods and therefore "batches" of drilling rigs have been built. Offshore drilling rigs have been loosely classified in nominal "generations" depending upon the year built and water depth capability as follows:

Generation	Water depth		Dates
First	about 600 ft	200 m	Early 1960s
Second	about 1000 ft	300 m	1969–1974
Third	about 1500 ft	500 m	Early 1980s
Fourth	about 3000 ft	1000 m	1990s
Fifth	about 7500 ft	2500 m	1998–2004
Sixth	about 10000 ft	3000 m	2005–2010

== Applications ==
=== Mobile offshore drilling units (MODU) ===
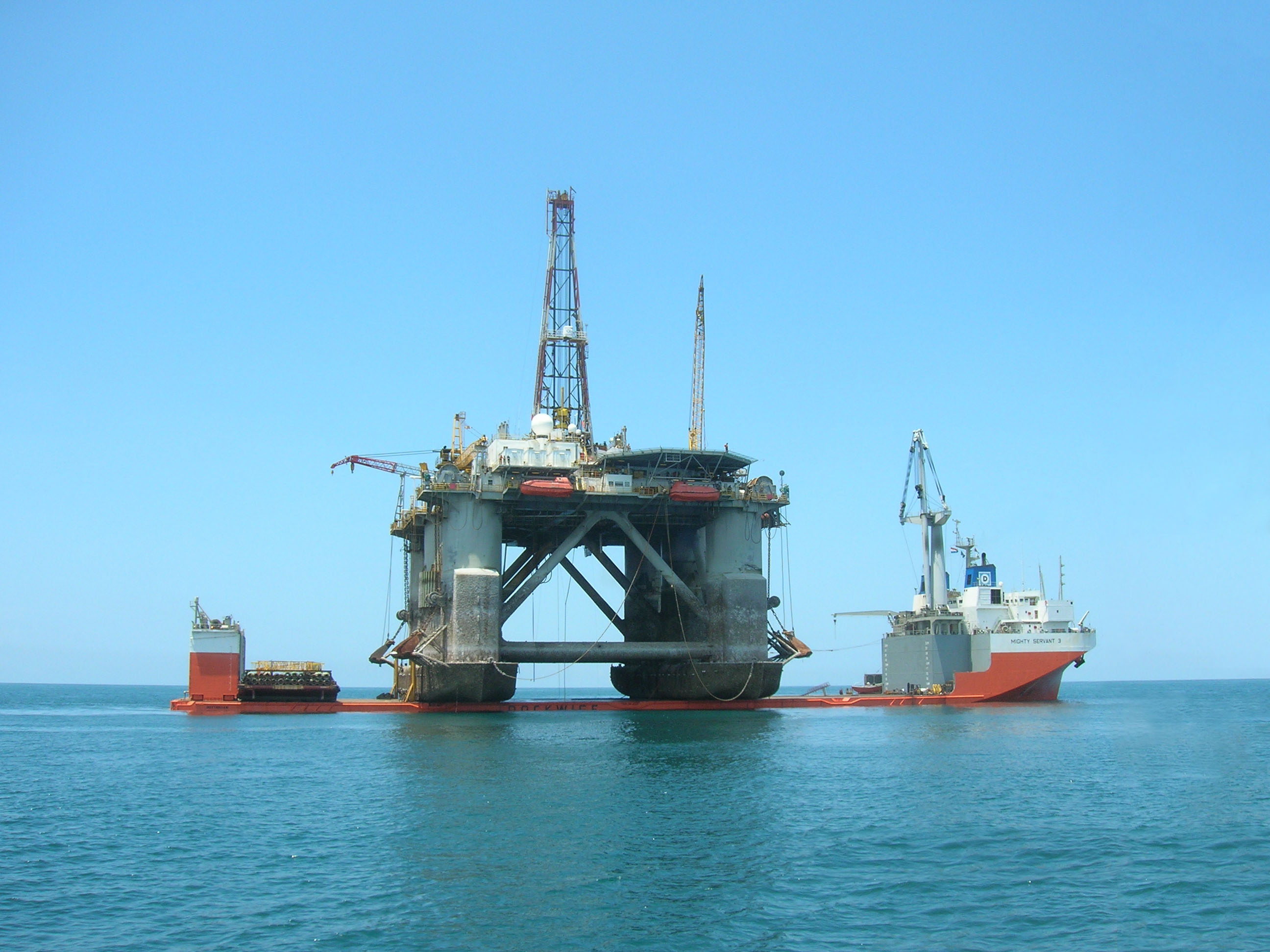
Semi-submersible drilling rig on MS3 semi-submersible heavy-lift ship

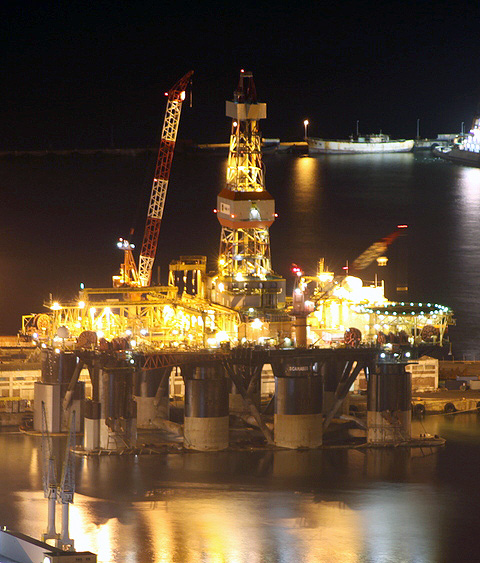
Saipem Scarabeo 7 semi-submersible drilling rig docked in Cape Town

Semi-submersible rigs make stable platforms for drilling for offshore oil and gas. They can be towed into position by a tugboat and anchored, or moved by and kept in position by their own azimuth thrusters with dynamic positioning.

The International Maritime Organization MODU Code is an accredited design and operational guideline for mobile offshore drilling units of the semi-submersible type.

=== Semi-submersible crane vessels (SSCV) ===
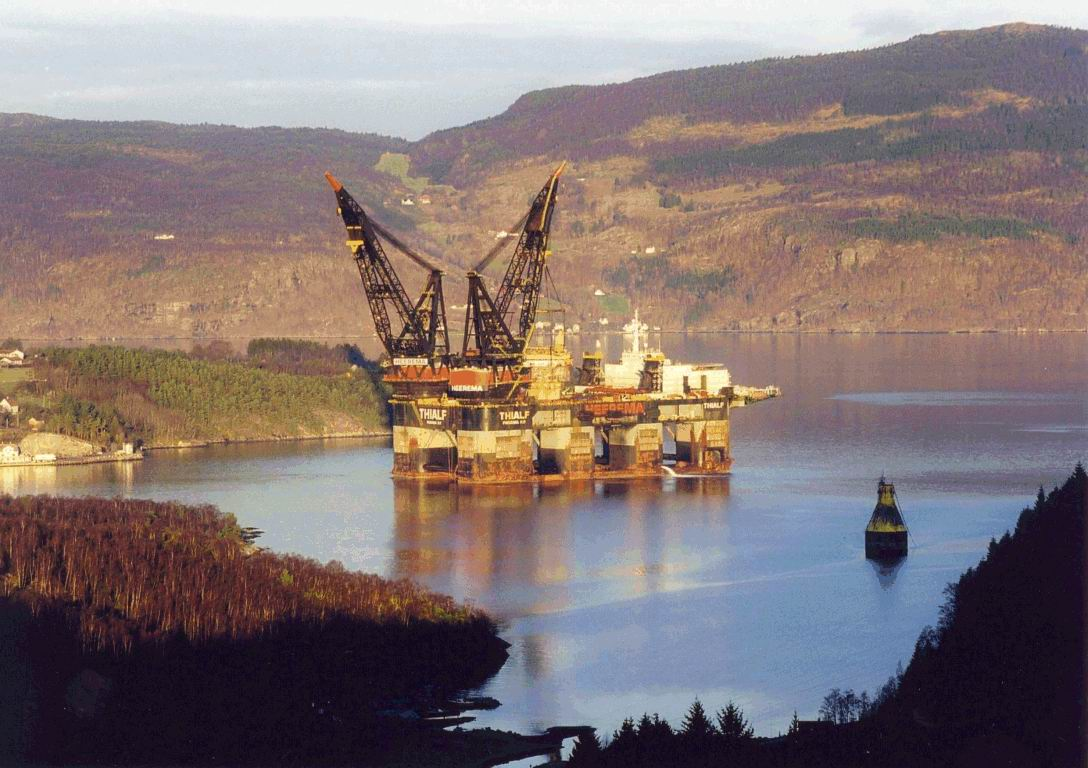
Thialf in Norwegian fjord with Fulmar single anchor leg mooring (SALM) buoy.

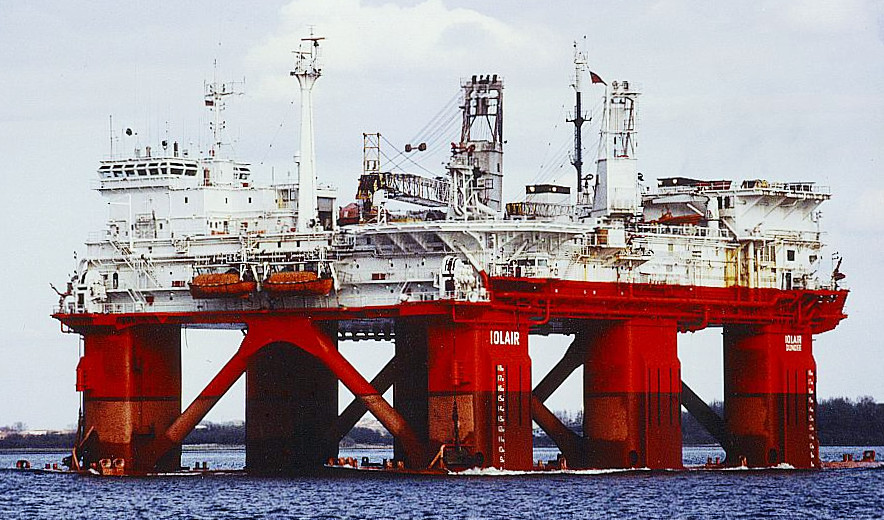
Iolair on Elbe river, 1990

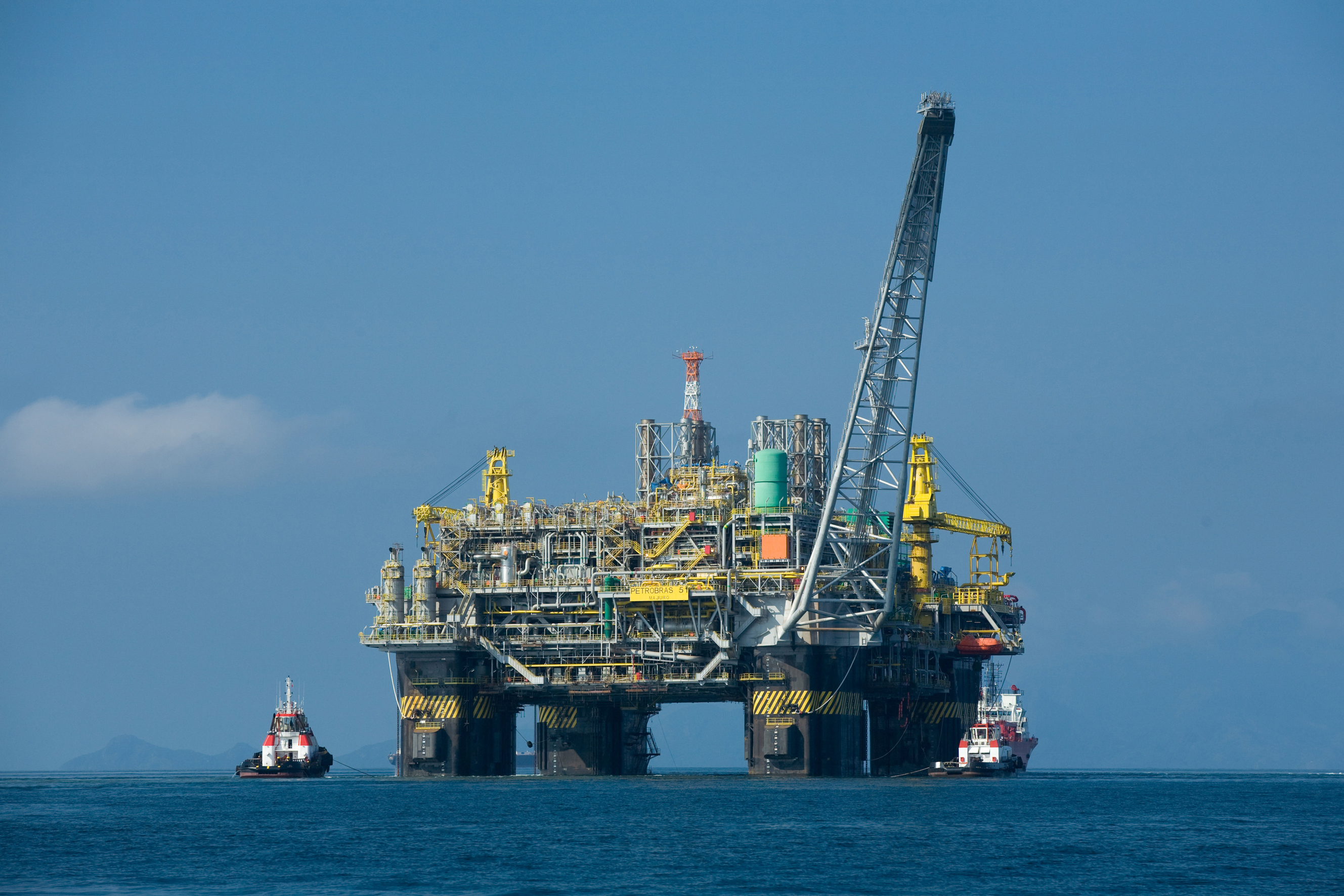
The Brazilian Petrobras P-51 semi-submersible oil platform

The advantages of the semi-submersible vessel stability were soon recognized for offshore construction when in 1978 Heerema Marine Contractors constructed the two sister crane vessels called Balder and Hermod. These semi-submersible crane vessels (SSCV) consist of two lower hulls (pontoons), three columns on each pontoon and an upper hull. Shortly after J. Ray McDermott and Saipem also introduced SSCVs, resulting in two new enormous vessels DB-102 (now Thialf) and Saipem 7000, capable of lifting respectively 14,200 and 14,000 tons.

During transit an SSCV is de-ballasted to a draught where only part of the lower hull is submerged. During lifting operations, the vessel is ballasted down. This way, the lower hull is well submerged. This reduces the effect of waves and swell. High stability is obtained by placing the columns far apart. The high stability allows them to lift extremely high loads safely.

=== Offshore support vessels (OSV) ===
Semi-submersibles are particularly suited to a number of offshore support vessel roles because of their good stability, large deck areas, and variable deck load (VDL).

Notable vessels are as follows:

- Transocean Marianas – Offshore safety support vessel, built in 1979 and since converted into a drilling vessel, and rechristened Transocean Marianas
- Iolair – Offshore safety support vessel, built for BP in 1982, Sedco/Phillips SS was the first built to Red Adair's recommendations. Iolair followed.
- Q4000 – Offshore multiservice vessel, built for Caldive in 2002

=== Offshore production platforms ===
When oil fields were first developed in offshore locations, drilling semi-submersibles were converted for use as combined drilling and production platforms. These vessels offered very stable and cost effective platforms. The first semi-submersible floating production platform was the Argyll FPF converted from the Transworld 58 drilling semi-submersible in 1975 for the Hamilton Brothers North Sea Argyll oil field.

As the oil industry progressed into deeper water and harsh environments, purpose-built production semi-submersible platforms were designed. The first purpose-built semi-submersible production platform was for the Balmoral field in the UK North Sea in 1986.

Notable platforms are as follows:

- Petrobras 36 – Converted from drilling rig Spirit of Columbus and sank in 2001
- Atlantis PQ – BP and BHP joint venture
- Thunder Horse PDQ – GVA40000 design, largest semi-submersible platform

=== Offshore rocket launch and landing platform ===
Ocean Odyssey was converted from a mobile drilling rig to a launch platform in 1997. In total, 36 rockets were launched from the platform. The last launch happened in 2014, shortly before its owner Sea Launch significantly reduced all operations.

The potential application of converted semi-submersible oil drilling rigs is being explored by Space Exploration Technologies (SpaceX) for launching and landing of Starship. SpaceX acquired two former offshore oil drilling rigs in 2021, similar to the ENSCO/Valaris 8506 offshore model, but later sold them in 2023 after they were considered unsuitable.

== See also ==
- Project 1231
- SeaOrbiter
- Drydock – facility used to repair and maintain ships; some are floating and can be submerged to load vessels.
- Heavy lift ship – semi-submerging vessel for transportation of very large loads.
- Narco-submarine – low profile vessels used to smuggle cocaine from South America to the United States.
- Ocean Ranger – semi-submersible drill rig that collapsed in a storm off the east coast of Canada in 1982 with the loss of all 84 crew members.
- RP FLIP (FLoating Instrument Platform) – a tilting craft designed to form a stable platform for scientific data collection.
- Submersible drilling rig – for submersible drilling vessels.
- USS Monitor – the U.S. Civil War warship considered to be the earliest semi-submerged ship.
- USS Spuyten Duyvil – another U.S. Civil War semi-submerged ship, capable of flooding down to a lower profile.
- Semi-submersible naval vessel
