= Project 1231 =

1960s Soviet surface combatant/submarine hybrid

Project 1231 boat. No-hydrofoil version.

Project 1231 was a hybrid surface combatant and submarine developed in the Soviet Union in the 1960s. It was known as "Dolphin" (Russian: Дельфин) and "diving missile boat" (Russian: ныряющий катер-ракетоносец), and represented a fundamentally new type of ship. It was a missile boat, with a considerable surface speed, yet able to dive and move underwater.

The idea of building Project 1231 is said to have originated with the Soviet premier, Nikita Khrushchev, who during a visit to a naval base in Balaklava saw submarines and missile boats next to each other. He conceived of an entire fleet able to submerge and thus ensure secrecy in the event of nuclear war. Khrushchev originally ordered the creation of a vessel that could fly, swim and dive. The designers convinced Khrushchev that the construction of a practical aircraft with the surface and sub-surface characteristics he required was impossible. Project 1231 built on the results of work on Project 662, a previous submersible ship: in particular, experience of Project 662 led to the use of hydrofoils for greater surfaced speed.

Work on Project 1231 was ceased after Khrushchev was deposed in 1964. No prototype was built and the design was closed. According to E. A. Aframeev, Project 1231 had no chance of practical implementation, despite the herculean efforts of designers.

== Previous projects ==
According to E. A. Aframeev the first practical suggestion for similar diving boats came from Valerian Brzezinski, who in 1939 developed the diving torpedo boat M-400 Flea in a special technical bureau of the NKVD in Factory 196, Leningrad. The boat had a surfaced displacement of 35.3 tons and speed of 33 knots (61 km/h; 38 mph), which when submerged became 74 tons and 11 knots (20 km/h; 13 mph) respectively. It was armed with two 450-millimetre (18 in) torpedo tubes and one machine gun. Power came from 2 diesels (which worked on a closed loop system when dived). The intended tactical employment was to approach the enemy underwater, fire a volley of torpedoes, surface and make a fast getaway. Boat building began in 1939 and by 1941, the boat was 60% ready. The project was temporarily shelved in 1942 during the siege of Leningrad, but damage from artillery fire caused the project to be written off completely.

Development of diving boats resumed at the end of the 1950s in the form of Project 662, which was rejected because of the low surface speed of 32 knots. The use of hydrofoils increased the speed of to 45-50 knots, but reduced the range to an unacceptable value. The underwater speed was only 5-6 knots, making the project unfit for combat.

== Bibliography ==
- Афрамеев, Э. А. (1998). "Проект 1231 опытного малого погружающегося ракетного корабля (Project 1231 - Experimental submersible missile boat)" (PDF). военно-технический сборник «Невский бастион» (in Russian). 2: 22–28.
- (in Russian) Афрамеев Э. А. Ныряющие катера-ракетоносцы, журнал «Военный парад» (1998), 3, pp. 77–81.
- (in Russian) Афрамеев Э. А. Проектный эксперимент: быстроходный катер — подводная лодка , Судостроение, 1999 4: pp:23-26. ISSN 0039-4580
- Афрамеев, Э. А. (2001). "Секретное Оружие ХХ Века (Secret Weapons of the 20th Century)". Тихоокеанская звезда (in Russian). Archived from the original on 28 November 2012.
- (in Russian) Широкорад А. Б. Оружие отечественного флота, АСТ/Харвест (Minsk/Moscow), 2001, p. 681
- (in Russian) Подводные лодки России ("Russian Submarines"), ЦКБ МТ «Рубин» (St Petersburg), 1996, volume IV
- Проект 1231 "Дельфин" (in Russian).
- Энциклопедия кораблей. Ныряющий катер (in Russian).
