= Maersk Drilling =

Danish petroleum company

- Industry: Oilfield services
- Founded: 1972
- Headquarters: Lyngby, Denmark
- Key people: Jørn Madsen (CEO)
- Services: Offshore drilling services
- Number of employees: 2,850
- Website: www.maerskdrilling.com

Maersk Drilling, also known as The Drilling Company of 1972 A/S, was the drilling-rig operator of Maersk. It was based in Lyngby, Denmark. Established in 1972, the company was a Nasdaq Copenhagen–listed company with the ticket name 'DRLCO'.

In November 2021, it was announced that Maersk Drilling would merge with Noble Corporation and that the combined company would be called Noble Corporation, with a valuation of £2.6 billion. The merger was completed on October 3, 2022.

== Fleet ==
Name	IMO	building year	model	type	Maximum drilling depth	Maximum water depth
Jackups
Maersk Convincer		2008	Baker Pacific Class 37	Cantilever Jack Up	30,000 ft	375ft/125m
Maersk Highlander		2016	Friede & Goldman JU2000E	Harsh environment, North Sea HP/HT jack up rig	30,000 ft	400 ft /122m
Mærsk Innovator		2003	MSC CJ70-150MC	Harsh environment, North Sea HP/HT jack up rig	30,000ft	492ft/150 m
Maersk Integrator		2015	MSC CJ70-X150 MD	Harsh environment, North Sea HP/HT jack up rig	40,000ft	492ft/150 m
Maersk Interceptor		2013	MSC CJ70-X150 MD	Harsh environment, North Sea HP/HT jack up rig	40,000ft	492ft/150 m
Maersk Intrepid		2014	MSC CJ70-X150 MD	Harsh environment, North Sea HP/HT jack up rig	40,000ft	492ft/150 m
Maersk Invincible		2016	MSC CJ70-X150 MD	Harsh environment, North Sea HP/HT jack up rig	40,000ft	492ft/150 m
Maersk Reacher		2009	MSC CJ50-X100 MC	Harsh environment, North Sea HP/HT jack up rig	30,000 ft	350 ft /106.7 m
Maersk Resilient		2008	MSC CJ50-X100 MC	Harsh environment, North Sea HP/HT jack up rig	30,000 ft	350 ft /106.7 m
Maersk Resolute		2008	MSC CJ50-X100 MC	Harsh environment, North Sea HP/HT jack up rig	30,000 ft	350 ft /106.7 m
Maersk Resolve		2009	MSC CJ50-X100 MC	Harsh environment, North Sea HP/HT jack up rig	30,000 ft	350 ft /106.7 m
Semi-submersibles
Maersk Discoverer		2009	DSS21-DPS2 Semi-Submersible	Self-Propelled A1 Column Stabilized Drilling Unit	32800ft/10000m	
Mærsk Deliverer		2009	DSS21-DP2 Semi-Submersible	Self-Propelled A1 Column Stabilized Drilling Unit	32800ft/10000m	
Mærsk Developer		2009	DSS21-DPS2 Semi-Submersible	Self-Propelled A1 Column Stabilized Drilling Unit	32800ft/10000m	
Maersk Explorer		2003	DSS20-CAM-M	Column Stabilized Semi-Submersible	30,000 ft/9140m	3281 ft /1000 m
Drillships
Maersk Valiant		2013	Samsung 96K Drill Ship	DP 3 Ship with Moonpool	40,000ft/12,000m	12,000ft/3657m
Maersk Venturer		2014	Samsung 96K Drill Ship	DP 3 Ship with Moonpool	40,000ft/12,000m	12,000ft/3657m
Maersk Viking		2013	Samsung 96K Drill Ship	DP 3 Ship with Moonpool	40,000ft/12,000m	12,000ft/3657m
Maersk Voyager		2014	Samsung 96K Drill Ship	DP 3 Ship with Moonpool	40,000ft/12,000m	12,000ft/3657m
