= List of oil spills =

This is a reverse-chronological list of oil spills that have occurred throughout the world and spill(s) that are currently ongoing. Quantities are measured in tonnes of crude oil with one tonne roughly equal to 308 US gallons, 256 Imperial gallons, 7.33 barrels, or 1165 litres. This calculation uses a median value of 0.858 for the specific gravity of light crude oil; actual values can range from 0.816 to 0.893, so the amounts shown below are inexact. They are also estimates, because the actual volume of an oil spill is difficult to measure exactly.

== Confirmed spills ==
Spill or vessel	Location	Dates (Note: May reflect the date of discovery of oil leakage or the date of the oil spill's start, in the case of continuous leakage.)	Tonnes (min)	Tonnes (max)	Owner	Ref(s)
2026 Twelvepole Creek oil spill	United States, Twelvepole Creek near East Lynn, West Virginia	13 January 2026	~15.9	~15.9	Appalachian Power	
2025 Johor Strait palm oil spill	Malaysia, off Kampung Pasir Putih, Johor Strait	30 October 2025				
Marine Dynamo collision with Flag Gangos	Singapore, off Tanah Merah, Singapore Strait	1 September 2025			V-Bunkers and Southport Wave SA	
2025 Indian Creek tanker truck rollover	United States, Indian Creek, Port Angeles, Washington	18 July 2025	9.74	9.74	PetroCard	
Langsat Terminal oil leak	Malaysia, Johor, Langsat Terminal	3 April 2025	1.4	1.4		
2025 PCG Brani Regional Base oil leak	Singapore, Pulau Brani	5 February 2025	23	23	Police Coast Guard (Singapore)	
Yangze 22	China, Yangtze River, near Hengsha East Anchorage	30 December 2024	9	9	Nebula Shipping	
2024 Bukom refinery leak	Singapore, off Pulau Bukom	27 December 2024			Shell	
Karak Highway tanker truck rollover	Malaysia, Selangor, Sungai Gombak	25 December 2024	20	20		
2024 Peru oil spill	Peru, Piura, near Talara Refinery	21 December 2024			Petroperu	
Ines Corrado	Singapore, off Changi, Singapore Strait	28 October 2024	5	5	Gestion Maritime	
2024 Bukom pipeline leak	Singapore, off Pulau Bukom	20 October 2024	30	40	Shell	
2024 Golfe Triste oil spill	Venezuela, near Puerto Cabello	17 August 2024			Petroleos de Venezuela SA	
2024 Manila Bay oil spill - MT Terra Nova capsized and sank in 34m depth of water	Philippines, Manila Bay	24 July 2024	unknown	~1,500	(MT Terra Nova sailed under the Philippine flag)	
Ceres I collision with Hafnia Nile	Singapore, South China Sea, off Pedra Branca	19 July 2024	unknown	unknown	OSM Thome and Hafnia	
2024 Singapore oil spill / Vox Maxima and Marine Honour	Singapore, Pasir Panjang Terminal	14 June 2024	400	400	Van Oord and Vitol Bunkers	
Karak Highway tanker truck rollover	Malaysia, Selangor	13 May 2024				
Gulfstream	Trinidad and Tobago, Tobago	7 February 2024		4,773		
El Palito Refinery	Venezuela, Golfo Triste	December 2023			Petróleos de Venezuela	
Undersea pipeline near Louisiana coast	United States, Port Eads, Louisiana, Louisiana	16 November 2023	3,500	3,500	Main Pass Oil Gathering company	
2023 Marco Polo oil spill	Sweden, Karlshamn, Blekinge	22 October 2023	150	180	TT-Line	
Poole Harbour oil spill	United Kingdom, Wytch Farm, Poole Harbour, Dorset	26 March 2023		6	Perenco	
2023 Princess Empress oil spill	Philippines, Pola, Oriental Mindoro	28 February 2023	881	881	RDC Reield Marine Services	
2022 Keystone Pipeline oil spill	United States, Washington County, Kansas	7 December 2022	1,773	1,910	TC Energy	
2022 Saint Bernard Parish oil spill	United States, Saint Bernard Parish, Louisiana	25 September 2022	65	65	Entergy Louisiana	
2022 Frog Lake oil spill	United States, Bayou Sorrel, Louisiana	31 July 2022	13	13	WCC Energy	
2022 Cheshire oil truck rollover	United States, Cheshire, Connecticut	11 February 2022	62.98	62.98	Libretti and Sons Fuel	
2022 Callao oil spill	Ventanilla District, Callao, Peru	15 January 2022	1,626.39	1,861.68	Repsol	
2021 New Orleans oil spill	United States, St. Bernard Parish, Louisiana	27 December 2021	944.11	944.11	PBF Energy	
2021 Orange County oil spill	United States, Orange County, California shoreline	1 October 2021	424.42	424.42	Amplify Energy	
2021 Mediterranean oil spill / Emerald (Note: Israeli Environment Protection Minister Gila Gamliel named the Libyan-owned vessel Emerald as the culprit, which was smuggling crude oil from Iran to Syria under a Panamanian flag.)	Israel, Lebanon, Mediterranean shoreline	11 February 2021	unknown	unknown	Emerald Marine Ltd	
Chevron Richmond Refinery	United States, Richmond, California	9 February 2021	1.9	1.9	Chevron Corporation	
2020 Colonial Pipeline oil spill	United States, North Carolina, Huntersville	14 August 2020	63,000	63,000	Colonial Pipeline	
El Palito Refinery	Venezuela, Golfo Triste	8 August 2020	2,700	2,700	Petróleos de Venezuela	
2020 Pointe D'Esny; MV Wakashio oil spill	Mauritius, Ile Aux Aigrettes and Mahébourg	25 July 2020	1,300	4,300	Wakashio Suisan Company Limited, Kagoshima, Japan	
Trans Mountain oil spill	Canada, British Columbia, Abbotsford	14 June 2020	118.5	184.87	Trans Mountain	
Norilsk diesel fuel spill	Russia, Norilsk, Krasnoyarsk Krai	29 May 2020	17,500	17,500	Nornickel	
Tanker truck pumping out sludge from a vessel	New Zealand, Tauranga, Bay of Plenty	30 March 2020	1.7	1.7		
T. G. Williams Well No. 1 tank battery	United States, Texas, Oakland Creek, Longview	30 March 2020	unknown	unknown	Fortune Resources	
Greka Energy oil facility	United States, California, Santa Maria	30 March 2020	'small'	unknown	Greka Energy	
True Oil pipeline	United States, North Dakota, Red Wing Creek	27 March 2020	unknown	unknown	True Oil LLC	
Tanker truck rollover	United States, California, Santa Maria, Cuyama River	21 March 2020	14.6	19.5		
Keystone Pipeline 2019 spill	United States, North Dakota, Walsh County, North Dakota	29 October 2019	1,240	1,240	TransCanada Corporation	
Willowton Oil	South Africa, KwaZulu-Natal, near Pietermaritzburg and Durban	August 2019	unknown	unknown	Willowton Group	
North East Brazil oil spill (suspected source: NM Bouboulina)	Brazil, 733 km from Paraiba	29 July 2019	unknown	unknown	Delta Tankers Ltd.	
Guarello Island iron ore export terminal diesel spill	Chile, Guarello Island, Magallanes Region	27 July 2019	35.4	35.4	Compañía de Acero del Pacífico	
MV Chrysanthi S bunkering spill at sea	South Africa, Algoa Bay, Port of Ngqura	6 July 2019	0.2	0.4	SA Marine Fuels (bunkering service company)	
MV Solomon Trader fuel oil spill	Solomon Islands, Rennell Island	5 February 2019	75	80	South Express Ltd	
SeaRose FPSO production ship spill	Canada, St. John's, Newfoundland and Labrador	16 November 2018	219	219	Husky Energy	
Ulysse-Virginia collision	North of Corsica (international waters)	October 2018				
Port Erin diesel spill (source unknown)	Isle of Man	23 July 2018	unknown	unknown	unknown	
Doon, Iowa derailment	United States, Lyon County, Iowa	22 June 2018	520	520	BNSF Railway	
Sanchi oil tanker collision with CF Crystal	East China Sea	6 January 2018	138,000	138,000	National Iranian Tanker Company	
Keystone Pipeline 2017 spill	United States, Marshall County, South Dakota	16 November 2017	1,322	1,322	TransCanada Corporation	
Delta House floating production platform spill	United States, Gulf of Mexico, near Louisiana	11 October 2017 – 12 October 2017	1,080	1,280	LLOG Exploration	
Agia Zoni II oil spill	Greece, Saronic Gulf, Salamis	10 September 2017	2,500	2,500	Fos Petroleum SA	
Chemroad Mega collision with Sinica Graeca	Malaysia, Johor, Pengerang, off Tompok Utara	19 August 2017			IINO Marine Services and Angelakos	
East River insulating oil spill	United States, New York	7 May 2017	97	101	Con Edison	
Energy Transfer Partners Dakota Access Pipeline Leak	United States, North Dakota	4 April 2017	0.27	0.27	Energy Transfer Partners	
Chennai Ennore oil spill	India, Chennai, Tamil Nadu	28 January 2017	251	251	Darya Shipping Solutions	
APL Denver and Wan Hai 301	Singapore, off Pulau Ubin, East Johor Strait	3 January 2017	300	300		
Belle Fourche pipeline leak	United States, North Dakota, Billings County, Ash Coulee Creek	5 December 2016	571	571	Belle Fourche Pipeline Company	
Fox Creek pipeline leak	Canada, Alberta, Fox Creek	6 October 2016	240	240	Trilogy Energy	
BP Clair production platform, North Sea	United Kingdom, Shetland, Clair platform	2 October 2016	105	105	S.McDonald/D.Goodrum	
2016 Colonial Pipeline leak	United States, Shelby County, Alabama	12 September 2016	1,092	1,092	Colonial Pipeline Co	
North Battleford pipeline spill	Canada, Saskatchewan, North Battleford	21 July 2016	170	210	Husky Energy	
ConocoPhillips Canada pipeline spill	Canada, Alberta, Grande Cache	9 June 2016	323	323	ConocoPhillips	
2016 Union Pacific oil train fire	United States, Oregon, Mosier	3 June 2016	152	152	Union Pacific Railroad	
Denbury Resources Bowman County Oil SPill	United States, North Dakota Bowman County	18 May 2016	44	44	Denbury Resources	
Shell Gulf of Mexico oil spill, Brutus offshore platform	United States, Gulf of Mexico, near Louisiana	12 May 2016	316	316	Royal Dutch Shell	
Keystone Pipeline 2016 spill	United States, Menno, South Dakota	2 April 2016	55	55	TransCanada Corporation	
Refugio oil spill	United States, California, near Refugio State Beach	19 May 2015	330	330	Plains All American Pipeline	
MV Marathassa bunker fuel spill	Canada, British Columbia, English Bay (Vancouver)	13 April 2015	2.3	2.3	Alassia NewShips Management Inc.	
Illinois train derailment	United States, Illinois, near Galena	5 March 2015	1,300	1,300	BNSF Railway	
2015 Yellowstone River oil spill	United States, Montana, near Glendive	17 January 2015	41	160	Bridger Pipeline LLC	
Alyarmouk and Sinar Kapuas	Singapore, off Pedra Branca, Singapore Strait	2 January 2015	4,500	4,500		
Black Sea oil pipeline spill	Russia, Tuapse, near Black Sea	24 December 2014	unknown	unknown	Transneft	
2014 Israeli oil spill	Israel, Eilat, Trans-Israel pipeline	6 December 2014	1,948	4,300	Eilat Ashkelon Pipeline Company	
Mid-Valley Pipeline	United States, Louisiana, Mooringsport	13 October 2014	546	546	Sunoco	
Lake Michigan oil spill	United States, Indiana, Whiting refinery	24 March 2014	2	5	BP	
MV Miss Susan/MV Summer Wind	United States, Texas, Houston Ship Channel	22 March 2014	546	546	Kirby Corporation	
North Dakota pipeline spill	United States, North Dakota, Hiland	21 March 2014	110	110	Hiland Crude LLC	
Hammonia Thracium and Zoey	Singapore, off Pulau Sebarok, Singapore Strait	11 February 2014	80	80		
NYK Themis and AZ Fuzhou	Singapore, off Marina South, East Keppel Fairway	30 January 2014	400	400		
Lime Galaxy and Feihe	Singapore, off Jurong Island, Singapore Strait	29 January 2014	280	280		
North Dakota train collision	United States, North Dakota, Casselton	30 December 2013	1,300	1,300	BNSF Railway	
Bullenbaai	Curaçao, Bullenbaai, Isla refinery	1 November 2013	unknown	unknown	Petróleos de Venezuela	
North Dakota pipeline spill	United States, North Dakota, Tioga	25 September 2013 – 29 September 2013	2,810	2,810	Tesoro	
Sept-Îsles Bay fuel oil spill	Canada, Québec, Pointe-Noire	1 September 2013	4.6	7.36	Cliffs Natural Resources	(Note: 450000 liters of heavy fuel oil were spilled, but most oil was contained in a secondary containment basin, with 5000 to 8000 liters escaping into the bay)
Rayong oil spill	Thailand, Rayong/Ko Samet, Gulf of Thailand	27 July 2013	43	163	PTT Global Chemical	
Lac-Mégantic derailment	Canada, Québec, Lac-Mégantic	6 July 2013	4,830	4,830		
Cushing storage terminal	United States, Oklahoma, Cushing	18 May 2013	340	340	Enbridge Energy Partners	
Mayflower	United States, Arkansas, Mayflower	30 March 2013	680	950	ExxonMobil	
Magnolia refinery	United States, Arkansas, Magnolia	9 March 2013	680	760	Delek Logistics	
Bullenbaai	Curaçao, Bullenbaai	7 November 2012	unknown	unknown	Petróleos de Venezuela	
Arthur Kill storage tank diesel spill (Hurricane Sandy)	United States, New Jersey, Sewaren	29 October 2012	1,090	1,130	Exxon	
Curaçao	Curaçao, Isla refinery and Jan Kok nature preserve	17 August 2012	unknown	unknown	Petróleos de Venezuela	
Sundre, Alberta	Canada, Sundre	8 June 2012	410	410		
Guarapiche River	Venezuela, Maturín, Monagas	4 February 2012	680	41,000	PDVSA	
Nigeria	Nigeria, Bonga Field	21 December 2011	5,500	5,500	Royal Dutch Shell	
TK Bremen	France, Brittany, Erdeven	16 December 2011	220	220	Blue Atlantic Shipping	
Campos Basin	Brazil, Campos Basin, Frade Field	7 November 2011 – 15 November 2011	89	400	Chevron Corporation	
Rena oil spill	New Zealand, Tauranga, Bay of Plenty	5 October 2011 – August 2012	350	350	Costamare	
Gannet Alpha platform, North Sea	United Kingdom, North Sea, Gannet Alpha platform	10 August 2011 – 13 August 2011	216	216	Royal Dutch Shell	
Yellowstone River	United States, Billings, Montana, Yellowstone River	1 July 2011	105	140	ExxonMobil	
Bohai Bay oil spill	China, Bohai Bay	4 June 2011 – 19 June 2011	204	204	ConocoPhillips	
Little Buffalo oil spill	Canada, Alberta	29 April 2011	3,800	3,800	Plains All American Pipeline	
MS Oliva grounding	Saint Helena, Ascension and Tristan da Cunha, Nightingale Island	16 March 2011	1,500	1,500		
Mumbai-Uran pipeline spill	India, Mumbai, Maharashtra	21 January 2011	40	55		
Fiume Santo power station	Italy, Sardinia, Porto Torres	11 January 2011	15	15		
Mumbai oil spill / MV MSC Chitra and MV Khalijia 3	India, Mumbai, Maharashtra	7 August 2010 – 9 August 2010	400	800		
Barataria Bay oil spill	United States, Barataria Bay, Gulf of Mexico	27 July 2010 – 1 August 2010	23	45	Cedyco Corp.	
Kalamazoo River oil spill	United States, Kalamazoo River, Calhoun County, Michigan	26 July 2010	2,800	3,250	Enbridge	
Xingang Port oil spill	China, Yellow Sea	16 July 2010 – 21 July 2010	1,500	90,000		
Jebel al-Zayt oil spill	Egypt, Red Sea	16 June 2010 – 23 June 2010	unknown	unknown		
Red Butte Creek oil spill	United States, Salt Lake City, Utah	11 June 2010 – 12 June 2010	65	107		
Trans-Alaska Pipeline	United States, Anchorage, Alaska	25 May 2010	400	1,200		
MT Bunga Kelana 3	Singapore, Singapore Strait	25 May 2010	2,000	2,500		
ExxonMobil	Nigeria, Niger Delta	1 May 2010	3,246	95,500	ExxonMobil	
Deepwater Horizon	United States, Gulf of Mexico	20 April 2010 – 15 July 2010	492,000	627,000	BP	
Great Barrier Reef / MV Shen Neng 1	Australia, Great Keppel Island	3 April 2010	3	4	Shenzhen Energy	
Lambro and Po rivers	Italy, Lombardy, Monza	23 February 2010	15	15		
Port Arthur oil spill	United States, Port Arthur, Texas	23 January 2010	1,500	1,500	ExxonMobil	
Yellow River oil spill	China, Chishui River (Shaanxi)	5 January 2010	130	130	China National Petroleum Corporation	
Montara oil spill	Australia, Timor Sea	21 August 2009	4,000	30,000	PTT Exploration and Production	
Full City	Norway, Rognsfjorden near Såstein south of Langesund	31 July 2009	200	200	COSCO	
Lüderitz oil spill	Namibia, Southern coast	8 April 2009	unknown	unknown	unknown	
Pacific Adventurer	Australia, Queensland	10 March 2009	230	260	Swire Shipping	
West Cork oil spill	Ireland, Southern coast	February 2009	300	300		
Shell Bodo Pipeline Oil Spill	Nigeria	1 August 2008	1,000	1,000	Royal Dutch Shell	
2008 New Orleans oil spill	United States, Mississippi River from New Orleans, Louisiana 100 miles downstream to Head of Passes	28 July 2008	8,800	8,800	American Commercial Barge Line LLC	
Syros / Seabird collision	Uruguay, near the Rio de la Plata, Montevideo	4 June 2008	140	140		
Supe	Peru, off Zorritos	31 January 2008	35	35		
Statfjord oil spill	Norway, Norwegian Sea	12 December 2007	4,000	4,000	Statoil Petroleum, ExxonMobil, Centrica	
2007 South Korea oil spill	South Korea, Yellow Sea	7 December 2007	10,800	10,800		
2007 Kerch Strait oil spill	Ukraine; Russia, Strait of Kerch	11 November 2007	1,000	1,000		
COSCO Busan oil spill	United States, San Francisco, California	7 November 2007	188	188		
Kab 101	Mexico, Bay of Campeche	23 October 2007 – 17 December 2007	1,869	1,869		
Genmar Progress Spill	Puerto Rico, Guayanilla, Puerto Rico	30 August 2007	151	151	General Maritime Corporation (GMC) Progress LLC	
Burnaby spill	Canada, Burnaby, British Columbia	24 July 2007	201	201	Kinder Morgan Energy Partners	
Bayou Perot oil spill	United States, Bayou Perot near Lafitte, Louisiana	20 January 2007	338 (Note: 8270 liquid barrels recovered, but oil may have been released as a 60–70% emulsion with water)	1,128	ExPert Oil & Gas LLC	
Guimaras oil spill	Philippines, Guimaras Strait	11 August 2006	172	1,540		
Jiyeh power station oil spill	Lebanon	14 July 2006 – 15 July 2006	20,000	30,000		
Citgo refinery	United States, Lake Charles, Louisiana	19 June 2006	6,500	6,500		
Prudhoe Bay oil spill	United States, Alaska North Slope, Alaska	2 March 2006	653	689		
Eider	Chile, Antofagasta	31 October 2005	200	200		
Bass Enterprises Oil Spill (Hurricane Katrina)	United States, Cox Bay, Louisiana	30 August 2005	12,000	12,000		
Shell (Hurricane Katrina)	United States, Pilottown, Louisiana	30 August 2005	3,400	3,400	Royal Dutch Shell	
Chevron (Hurricane Katrina)	United States, Empire, Louisiana	30 August 2005	3,200	3,200		
Murphy Oil USA refinery spill (Hurricane Katrina)	United States, Meraux and Chalmette, Louisiana	30 August 2005	2,660	3,410		
Bass Enterprises (Hurricane Katrina)	United States, Pointe à la Hache, Louisiana	30 August 2005	1,500	1,500		
Chevron (Hurricane Katrina)	United States, Port Fourchon, Louisiana	30 August 2005	170	170		
Venice Energy Services Company (Hurricane Katrina)	United States, Venice, Louisiana	30 August 2005	81	81		
Shell Pipeline Oil (Hurricane Katrina)	United States, Nairn, Louisiana	30 August 2005	44	44	Royal Dutch Shell	
Sundown Energy (Hurricane Katrina)	United States, West Potash, Louisiana	30 August 2005	42	42		
MV Selendang Ayu	United States, Unalaska Island, Alaska	8 December 2004	1,560	1,560		
Athos 1	United States, Delaware River, Paulsboro, New Jersey	26 November 2004	831	860		
Taylor oil spill	United States, Gulf of Mexico near Louisiana	16 September 2004 – present	970	490,000	Taylor Energy	
MP-69 Nakika 18" & MP-151 Nakika 18" pipeline (Hurricane Ivan)	United States, Louisiana	16 September 2004 – 6 October 2004	618	618		
MP-80 Delta 20" pipeline (Hurricane Ivan)	United States, Louisiana	16 September 2004 – 19 September 2004	963	963		
Chevron-Texaco tank collapse (Hurricane Ivan)	United States, Louisiana	16 September 2004 – 17 September 2004	423	423		
Berge Nice	Chile, 5 miles east of Punta Delgada, Strait of Magellan	14 May 2004	160	160		
Tasman Spirit	Pakistan, Karachi	28 July 2003	28,000	30,000	Polembros Shipping	
MV APL Emerald	Singapore, off Pedra Branca, Singapore Strait	12 June 2003	150	150		
Bouchard No. 120	United States, Buzzards Bay, Bourne, Massachusetts	27 April 2003	71	318	Bouchard Transportation Company	
Prestige	Spain, Galicia	13 November 2002	63,000	63,000	Mare Shipping Inc.	
Limburg (bombing)	Yemen, Gulf of Aden	6 October 2002	12,200	12,200		
Manguinhos refinery	Brazil, Guanabara Bay, Rio de Janeiro	23 November 2001	34	97	Peixoto de Castro, Repsol YPF	
Trans-Alaska Pipeline gunshot spill	United States, Alaska	4 October 2001	932	932	Alyeska Pipeline Service Company	
Shell Ogbodo	Nigeria	25 June 2001	9,500	9,500	Royal Dutch Shell	
Jose Fuchs	Chile, Moraleda Channel	25 May 2001	150	150		
2001 Shell Ogoniland oil spill	Nigeria	May 2001	unknown	unknown	Royal Dutch Shell	
Petrobras 36	Brazil, Roncador Oil Field, Campos Basin	15 March 2001	274	274		
Amorgos oil spill	Taiwan, Southern coast	14 January 2001	1,150	1,150		
Jessica	Ecuador, Galapagos Islands	20 January 2001	568	568		
Natuna Sea	Singapore, off Batu Berhanti Beacon, Singapore Strait	3 October 2000	7,000	7,000		
Pine River	Canada, Chetwynd, British Columbia	1 August 2000	850	850		
Project Deep Spill	Norway, Helland Hansen ridge	June 2000	100	100		
Treasure	South Africa, Cape Town	June 2000	1,400	1,400		
Petrobras pipeline	Brazil, Guanabara Bay, Rio de Janeiro	January 2000	1,100	1,100		
Erika	France, Bay of Biscay	12 December 1999	15,000	25,000	Total S.A.	
Chanda	Port Stanvac, South Australia	28 June 1999	220	230	Essar Shipping	
MV New Carissa	United States, Coos Bay, Oregon	4 February 1999 – 9 March 1999	230	230		
Estrella Pampeana	Argentina, Río de la Plata near Magdalena	15 January 1999	4,400	4,660	Royal Dutch Shell	
Mobil Nigeria oil spill	Nigeria	12 January 1998	5,500	5,500		
Nakhodka	Japan, Sea of Japanne	December 1997	6,240	6,240		
1997 Singapore oil spill / Evoikos and Orapin Global	Singapore, off Pulau Sebarok, Singapore Strait	15 October 1997	25,000	29,000		
MV Diamond Grace	Japan, Uraga Channel, off Tokyo Bay	27 July 1997	1,550	1,677		
San Jorge oil spill	Uruguay, near Punta del Este, Maldonado	8 February 1997	200	200	Oil Sud Corporation	
Julie N oil spill	United States, Portland, Maine	27 September 1996	586	586		
Song San	Singapore, off Jurong Island, Singapore Strait	August 1996	unknown	unknown		
Sea Empress	United Kingdom, Milford Haven, Pembrokeshire	15 February 1996	40,000	72,000	Seatankers Management	
North Cape	United States, Rhode Island	19 January 1996	2,500	2,500		
Iron Baron	(Australia) Hebe Reef, Tasmania	10 July 1995 – 30 July 1995	300	325	BHP Shipping	
Irene	Namibia, near Walvis Bay	1995	700	700		
Komi oil pipeline	Russia, Usinsk, Komi Republic	June 1994 - October 1994	100,000	251,763	Lukoil	
Apollo Sea	South Africa, Cape Town	June 1994	2,400	2,400		
Seki	United Arab Emirates	31 March 1994	15,900	15,900	World-Wide Shipping Agency	
Morris J. Berman	Puerto Rico	7 January 1994	2,600	2,600	New England Marine Services	
MV Braer	United Kingdom, Shetland	5 January 1993	85,000	85,000		
Aegean Sea	Spain, A Coruña	3 December 1992	74,000	74,000	Coulouthros Ltd	
Port Bonython oil spill, Era	Australia, Spencer Gulf, South Australia	30 August 1992	296	296	BP	
Katina P	Mozambique, Maputo	26 April 1992	72,000	72,000		
Fergana Valley	Uzbekistan	2 March 1992	285,000	285,000		
Kirki	Australia, Indian Ocean, off the coast of Western Australia	21 July 1991	17,280	17,280	BP	
ABT Summer	Angola, 700 nmi (1,300 km; 810 mi) offshore	28 May 1991	260,000	260,000	National Iranian Tanker Company	
MT Haven	Italy, Mediterranean Sea near Genoa	11 April 1991	144,000	144,000	Amoco	
MB Vesta Bella	, Saint Kitts and Nevis, Nevis, 12 miles northeast of island	6 March 1991	1,762	1,814	Offshore Marine Ltd	
Sanko Harvest	Australia, Western Australia, near Hood Island, 33 km from Esperance	14 February 1991	717	717	Sanko Steamship Co	
Gulf War oil spill	Iraq, Persian Gulf	23 January 1991	270,000	820,000		
Star Enterprise Terminal Leak	United States, Fairfax, Virginia	September 1990	324	974	Star Enterprise	
Apex barges oil spill	United States, Texas, Houston Ship Channel near Galveston	28 July 1990	2,200	2,200	Apex Towing Company	
Mega Borg oil spill	United States, Gulf of Mexico, 57 mi (92 km) SE of Galveston, Texas	8 June 1990	16,499	16,501		
American Trader	United States, Bolsa Chica State Beach, California	7 February 1990	979	981		
Arthur Kill pipeline	United States, Sewaren, New Jersey	1 January 1990	1,840	1,840		
Khark 5	Spain, 350 nmi (650 km; 400 mi) off Las Palmas de Gran Canaria	19 December 1989	70,000	80,000		
Pacificos	South Africa, East London	4 October 1989	10,000	10,000		
Presidente Rivera	United States, Delaware River, Marcus Hook, Pennsylvania	24 June 1989	993	993		
World Prodigy	United States, Aquidneck Island, Rhode Island	23 June 1989	974	3,246		
Exxon Valdez	United States, Prince William Sound, Alaska	24 March 1989	37,000	104,000	Exxon Shipping Company	
Bahía Paraíso	Antarctica, Bismarck Strait	28 January 1989	1,200	1,200	Argentine Navy	
Odyssey	Canada, 700 nmi (1,300 km; 810 mi) off Nova Scotia	10 November 1988	132,000	132,000		
Piper Alpha disaster	United Kingdom, 120 miles (190 km) north-east of Aberdeen, Scotland	6 July 1988	670	670	Occidental Petroleum (Caledonia) Limited (OPCAL)	
Ashland oil spill	United States, Floreffe, Pennsylvania	2 January 1988	10,000	10,000	Ashland Oil Company	
MT Vector	Philippines, Tablas Strait, Oriental Mindoro	20 December 1987	370	370	Vector Shipping Inc. (Francisco Soriano), Manila	
Cabo Pilar	Chile, Punta Davis, Strait of Magellan	8 October 1987	4,900	7,500		
Elhani	Singapore, off Pulau Satumu, Singapore Strait	July 1987	2,300			
Stolt Advance	Singapore, off Saint John's Island, Singapore Strait	July 1987	unknown	unknown		
MV Fern Passet grounding	United States, St Johns River mouth, Florida	February 1987	346	346		
Amazon Venture oil spill	United States, Port of Savannah, Georgia	4 December 1986	1,623.38	1,623.38	Calluna Maritime Corporation	
1986 Bahía Las Minas oil spill	Panama, Isla Payardi, Bahía Las Minas	27 April 1986	6,821	unknown	Refineria Panamá, subsidiary of Texaco, Inc.	
Tanker Barge Apex Houston	United States, California Coast from Marin County to Big Sur, San Francisco, California	28 January 1986	98	98	Apex Towing Company	
Nova	Iran, Gulf of Iran, Kharg Island	6 December 1985	70,000	70,000		
Grand Eagle	United States, Delaware River, Marcus Hook, Pennsylvania	28 September 1985	1,400	1,400		
Coral Sea / Napo collision	Cuba	11 April 1985				
SS Puerto Rican	United States, Golden Gate, San Francisco, California	31 October 1984	3,411	4,775		
Alvenus	United States, Calcasieu Channel, Louisiana	30 July 1984	9,160	9,160		
SS Mobil Oil	United States, Columbia River, Longview, Washington	19 March 1984	550	650		
Castillo de Bellver	South Africa, Saldanha Bay	6 August 1983	252,000	252,000		
Nowruz Field Platform	Iran, Persian Gulf	4 February 1983	260,000	260,000		
Globe Asimi	Soviet Union, Lithuanian SSR, Klaipėda	21 November 1981	17,000	17,000	Cantabria Shipping Ltd	
Druzhba pipeline	Czechoslovakia, Bartoušov	3 November 1980	6,000	6,000		
Production Well D-103	Libya, Tripoli	1 August 1980	140,000	140,000		
Tanio oil spill	France, Brittany	7 March 1980	13,500	13,500		
Irenes Serenade	Greece, Pylos	23 February 1980	100,000	100,000		
MT Independenţa	Turkey, Bosphorus	15 November 1979	95,000	95,000		
Burmah Agate	United States, Galveston Bay, Texas	1 November 1979	8,440	8,440		
Aphrodite	Port Stanvac, South Australia	20 July 1979	unknown	unknown		
Atlantic Empress / Aegean Captain	Trinidad and Tobago	19 July 1979	287,000	287,000		
Ixtoc I oil spill	Mexico, Bay of Campeche, Gulf of Mexico	3 June 1979 – 23 March 1980	454,000	480,000	Pemex	
Betelgeuse	Ireland, Bantry Bay	8 January 1979	64,000	64,000		
Peck Slip Spill	Puerto Rico, Cabo San Juan, Puerto Rico	19 December 1978	1,550	1,550	Sun Oil Company	
Cabo Tamar	Chile, San Vincente Bay	7 June 1978	12,500	12,500		
Amoco Cadiz	France, Brittany	16 March 1978	223,000	227,000	Amoco	
Trans-Alaska Pipeline sabotage by explosives	United States, Alaska	15 February 1978	2,162	2,162		
Brazilian Marina	Brazil, Sao Sebastiao Channel, São Paulo	9 January 1978	10,039	10,039		
Venpet-Venoil collision	South Africa, Cape St. Francis	16 December 1977	26,600	30,500	Bethlehem Steel Corporation	
Unknown ship	United States, Key Largo, Florida	1 May 1977				
Ekofisk oil field	Norway, North Sea	22 April 1977	27,600	27,600		
MV Hawaiian Patriot	United States, 300 nmi (560 km; 350 mi) off Honolulu, Hawaii	26 February 1977	95,000	95,000		
Borag	Taiwan, Northern coast	7 February 1977	34,000	34,000		
Argo Merchant	United States, Nantucket Island, Massachusetts	15 December 1976	25,000	28,000		
NEPCO 140	United States, Saint Lawrence River	23 June 1976	1,000	1,000		
Urquiola	Spain, A Coruña	12 May 1976	100,000	100,000		
St. Peter	Colombia, Cabo Manglares	5 February 1976 – November 1976	38,056	38,056		
Niger Delta	Nigeria, Niger Delta	1976 – 1996	258,000	328,000	Royal Dutch Shell	
Olympic Bravery	France, Ushant	24 January 1976	900	900	Onassis	
Liberian tanker Garbis	United States, Florida Keys	18 July 1975	135	21,000		
Epic Colocotronis Spill	Puerto Rico, Rincon, Puerto Rico	13 May 1975	61,000	61,000	Colocotronis brothers of Greece and Great Britain	
Tarik Ibn Ziyad	Brazil, Sao Sebastiao terminal, Santos	26 March 1975	10,000	20,000		
Corinthos	United States, Delaware River, Marcus Hook, Pennsylvania	31 January 1975	36,000	36,000		
Jakob Maersk	Portugal, Porto	29 January 1975	88,000	88,000		
Afran Zodiac	Ireland, Bantry Bay	10 January 1975	451	451		
Showa Maru	Singapore, off Pulau Sebarok, Singapore Strait	7 January 1975	3,300	4,500		
Mizushima Refinery	Japan, Kurashiki, Seto Inland Sea	18 December 1974	42,000	45,356	Mitsubishi Petroleum (present day ENEOS)	
Bouchard 65 Barge	United States, Windsor Cove, Buzzards Bay, Massachusetts	9 October 1974	36	120		
VLCC Metula	Chile, Strait of Magellan	9 August 1974	50,000	51,000		
Oriental Pioneer	South Africa, Struisbaai	22 July 1974	200	200		
Jawachta	Sweden, Smygehuk	20 December 1973	3,000	16,000		
Trinimar Marine Well 327	Venezuela, Gulf of Paria	8 August 1973	1,091	1,091		
Napier	Chile, Guamblin Island	June 1973	30,000	30,000		
S.S. Zoe Colocotronis Spill	Puerto Rico, Lajas, Puerto Rico	18 March 1973	5,170	5,170	Colocotronis brothers of Greece and Great Britain	
Irish Stardust	Canada, Vancouver Island, British Columbia	January 1973	450	450		
Sea Star	Iran, Gulf of Oman	19 December 1972	115,000	115,000	Samyang Navigation	
Oswego-Guardian – Texanita collision	South Africa, Stilbaai	21 August 1972	10,000	10,000		
Myrtea	Singapore, off Pulau Bukom, Singapore Strait	June 1972	1,000	1,000		
Texaco Denmark	Belgium, North Sea	7 December 1971	107,000	107,000		
MV Juliana	Japan, Niigata Port	30 November 1971	7,200	7,784		
Navy tanker Towle	United States, New York City, New York, Gravesend Bay	14 July 1971	123	123		
Texaco Oklahoma	United States	27 March 1971	25,700	31,500		
Trinity Navigator	United Kingdom, Devon	2 March 1971	unknown	unknown		
Wafra	South Africa, Cape Agulhas	21 February 1971	27,000	27,000		
Arizona Standard / Oregon Standard collision	United States, San Francisco Bay	17 January 1971	2,700	2,700		
Othello	Sweden, Trälhavet Bay	20 March 1970	50,000	60,000		
Platform Charlie	United States, Louisiana	10 February 1970	unknown	unknown		
SS Arrow	Canada, Chedabucto Bay, Nova Scotia	4 February 1970	10,330	10,330		
Wild Harbor, Barge Florida	United States, Wild Harbor Bay, Buzzards Bay, Massachusetts	18 September 1969	614	614		
Hamilton Trader	United Kingdom, Liverpool Bay, Irish Sea	30 April 1969	546	546		
Santa Barbara	United States, Santa Barbara, California	28 January 1969	6,000	14,000		
Witwater	Panama, Canal Zone, Galeta Island	13 December 1968	1,910	1,910		
World Glory	South Africa, 65 miles ENE of Durban	13 June 1968	44,058	46,000	World Tankers Co. Inc.	
Genevieve	United States, Corpus Christi, Texas	25 April 1968	unknown	unknown	Lykes Brothers Steamship Co. Ltd.	
Andron	Namibia, between Luderitz and Walvis Bay	8 May 1968				
Esso Essen	South Africa	April 1968	4,092	4,092		
General Colocotronis	Bahamas, Eleuthera	7 March 1968	5,047	5,047		
Ocean Eagle	Puerto Rico, San Juan, Puerto Rico	3 March 1968	12,000	12,500	Transocean Tankers Inc.	
R.C. Stoner	United States, Pacific Ocean, Wake Island	1967	20,000	20,000		
Torrey Canyon	United Kingdom, Cornwall and Isles of Scilly	18 March 1967	80,000	119,000		
Mississippi River oil spill (1962–1963)	United States, Savage and Mankato, Minnesota	8 December 1962 – 23 January 1963	11,000	15,000		
African Queen	United States, Ocean City, Maryland	30 December 1958	21,000	21,000		
Avila Beach pipeline	United States, Avila Beach, California	1950s – 1996	1,300	1,300		
Guadalupe Oil Field	United States, Guadalupe, California	1950s – 1994	29,000	29,000		
Sliedrecht	South Africa, Cape Town, Table Bay	November 1953	1,000	1,000		
SS Jacob Luckenbach	United States, Gulf of the Farallones National Marine Sanctuary, San Francisco, California	14 July 1953 – present	1,484	1,484		
Esso Wheeling	South Africa, Quoin Point near Cape Town	4 November 1948				
Berth 157	United States, Wilmington	2 June 1948				
SS Douglas Victory	United States, Wilmington, California	27 March 1948				
SS River Raisin	United States	1948				
Lincoln	South Africa, Quoin Point near Cape Town	1946				
Greenpoint, Brooklyn	United States, Newtown Creek, Greenpoint, Brooklyn, New York	1940s – 1950s	55,200	97,400		
Seria Field 14 wells	Brunei	12 June 1945 – September 1945	unknown	unknown		
Scuttled tanker El Grillo	Iceland, Seyðisfjörður	February 1944 – present	unknown	unknown		
SS Frank H. Buck / SS President Coolidge collision	United States, San Francisco Bay, California	6 March 1937	8,870	8,870		
Lakeview Gusher	United States, Kern County, California	14 March 1910 – 10 September 1911	1,230,000	1,230,000		
Thomas W. Lawson	United Kingdom, Isles of Scilly	14 December 1907	7,400	7,400		
SS Petriana	Australia, Port Phillip, Victoria	30 November 1903	1,300	1,300	Asiatic Petroleum Company	
Copley No. 1 Well	United States, Glenville, West Virginia	22 September 1900	1,610	1,610	South Penn Oil Company	
Seaforth Channel	Canada, British Columbia	13 October 2016	110,000	110,000	Kirby Corp.	

== Investigation underway ==
Spill or vessel	Location	Dates	Estimated flow rate (tonnes/day)	Full cargo (tonnes)	Spilled (min tonnes)	Spilled (max tonnes)	Link	Notes
2024 Kerch Strait oil spill	Russia, Kerch Strait (Note: The Kerch Strait separates Russia's Krasnodar Krai and Russian-annexed Crimea, the latter internationally recognized as part of Ukraine)	15 December 2024 – present	Unknown	9,000	3,700	Unknown		Two fuel oil tankers foundered during a storm.
2024 Bayou Lafourche oil spill	United States, Lafourche Parish, Louisiana	27 July 2024	n/a	n/a	112	unknown		
Northeast Brazil oil spill	Brazil	September 2019 – present	n/a	n/a	1,000	unknown		Worst oil spill in Brazilian history and the largest environmental disaster ever recorded on the Brazilian coast or any tropical coastal region worldwide.
Lizama River oil spill	Colombia, Barrancabermeja	2 March 2018 -	n/a	n/a	3,690	unknown		Lizama 158 oil well spilled into Lizama River, contaminating Sogamoso River, a tributary to Colombia's largest river, the Magdalena.
OT Southern Star 7	Bangladesh, Sundarbans, Khulna Division	9 December 2014	n/a	350	300	300		Leak caused by collision of the oil tanker with a cargo vessel.
Napocor; Power Barge 103	Philippines, Estancia, Iloilo	8 November 2013	n/a	1200	170	520		Leaks caused by Typhoon Haiyan.
Taylor Energy wells Platform 23051	United States, Gulf of Mexico	16 September 2004 to present (22 years)	0.03–0.05	n/a	unknown	unknown		Leaks resulting from Hurricane Ivan have been largely contained, but not entirely. Ocean Saratoga is periodically onsite servicing and attempting to seal the leaks.

Note: The "flow rate" column applies to leaking wells, pipelines, etc., and is often used to estimate the total amount of oil spilled. The "full cargo" column applies to vessels, vehicles, etc., and represents the maximum amount of oil that could be spilled. The "spilled" columns indicate the total amount of oil that has been released to the environment so far, and should be based on official estimates found in referenced sources whenever possible. When official estimates vary, use the "min tonnes" and "max tonnes" columns to show the range of estimates (minimum and maximum) in metric tonnes (i.e. 1 tonne = 1,000 kg).

== Oil spills in the United States ==
This graphic is limited to oil spills that occurred between 1969 and 2015 (graphic has not been updated for newer spills) and that affected US waters (land-based spills are not depicted). Unlike the units of tonnes used on the rest of this page, the graphic's numbers are presented in millions of US gallons (abbreviated as "MG" in the graphic), where 1 MG is roughly equal to 3,250 tonnes of crude oil.

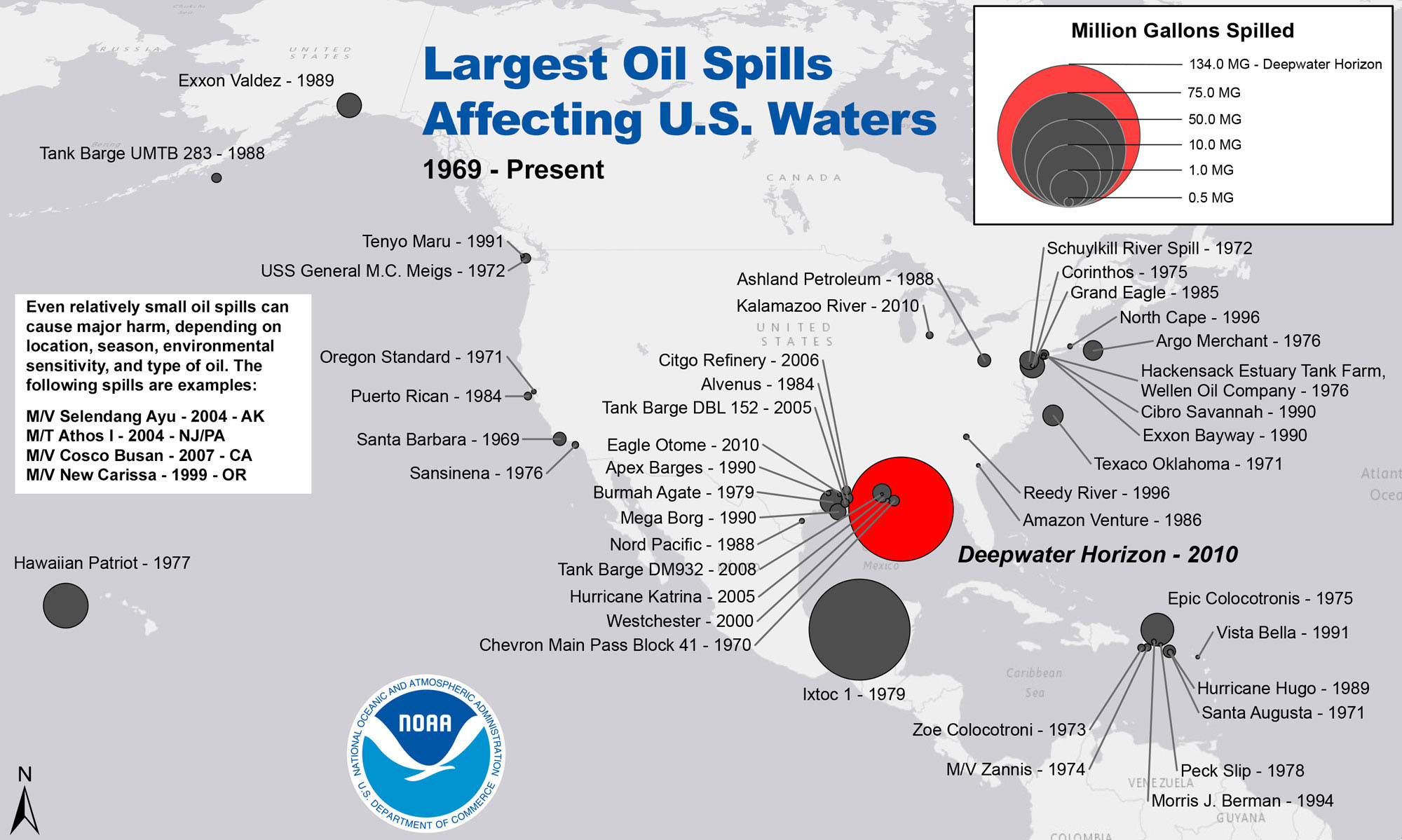
Largest Oil Spills Affecting U.S. Waters Since 1969

== See also ==
- Lists
  - Largest oil spills
  - Natural gas and oil production accidents in the United States
  - Pipeline accidents
- United States offshore drilling debate
