= 2010 oil spill =

2010 oil spill may refer to:

- Barataria Bay oil spill, near Bayou St. Dennis, 26 July 2010
- Kalamazoo River oil spill, Calhoun County, Michigan, 26 July 2010
- Deepwater Horizon oil spill in the Gulf of Mexico, 20 April 2010
- 2010 Great Barrier Reef oil spill off Australia, 3 April 2010
- 2010 Port Arthur oil spill in Texas, started 23 January 2010
- Yellow River oil spill in China, started on 30 December 2009 and continued in 2010
- Jebel al-Zayt oil spill in the Egyptian Red Sea, 15 June 2010
- Xingang Port oil spill in the Yellow Sea, July 16 2010
- 2010 Mumbai oil spill off the coast of Mumbai started on August 7, 2010

== See also ==
- List of oil spills
