= 2010 in the environment =

This is a list of notable events relating to the environment in 2010. They relate to environmental law, conservation, environmentalism and environmental issues.

== Events ==
- The International Year of Biodiversity was a year-long celebration of biological diversity and its value for life on Earth, taking place around the world in 2010. Coinciding with the date of the 2010 Biodiversity Target, the year was declared by the 61st session of the United Nations General Assembly in 2006.
- The 2010 Biodiversity Target was not achieved.
- The Indian Ocean Garbage Patch is discovered.
- Global Universities Partnership on Environment and Sustainability was founded.

=== January ===
- The 2010 Port Arthur oil spill was the result of a collision between two vessels in the Sabine-Neches Waterway at Port Arthur, Texas, in the United States.

=== March ===
- The Memorandum of Understanding on the Conservation of Migratory Sharks, an international instrument for the conservation of migratory species of sharks, comes into effect.

=== April ===
- The 2010 Great Barrier Reef oil spill occurred when the Chinese bulk coal carrier, MV Shen Neng 1 ran aground east of Rockhampton in Central Queensland, Australia.
- The Energy Act 2010 was passed in the United Kingdom pertaining to the regulation of energy usage and markets, with amendments to similar pieces of previous legislation.
- The Deepwater Horizon oil spill in the Gulf of Mexico flowed unabated for three months. It is the largest accidental marine oil spill in the history of the petroleum industry.
- The World People's Conference on Climate Change and the Rights of Mother Earth was a global gathering of civil society and governments hosted by the government of Bolivia in Tiquipaya, just outside the city of Cochabamba from April 19–22, 2010.

=== June ===
- The Jebel al-Zayt oil spill was an oil spill in the Red Sea, considered to be the largest offshore spill in Egyptian history.
- The Red Butte Creek oil spill occurred and was caused by a rupture in a medium crude oil pipeline that runs to the Chevron Corporation oil refinery in Salt Lake City Utah in the United States.

=== July ===
- The Kalamazoo River oil spill, caused by a rupture in Enbridge Energy pipeline line 6B in Calhoun County, Michigan in the United States, leaked 877,000 US gallons (3,320 m3) of oil sands crude into Talmadge Creek that flows into the Kalamazoo River.
- The Xingang Port oil spill occurred and was caused by a rupture and subsequent explosion of two crude oil pipelines that run to an oil storage depot of the China National Petroleum Corporation in Xingang Harbour, Dalian, Liaoning, China.
- The Protocol on Strategic Environmental Assessment comes into force. It supplements the UNECE Convention on Environmental Impact Assessment in a Transboundary Context.

=== August ===
- The 2010 Mumbai oil spill occurred after the Panama-flagged MV MSC Chitra and MV Khalijia 3 collided off the coast of India near Mumbai.

=== October ===
- The Ajka alumina sludge spill was an industrial accident at a caustic waste reservoir chain of the Ajkai Timföldgyár alumina plant in Ajka, Veszprém County, in western Hungary.

=== November ===
- The Tarawa Climate Change Conference was held in the Republic of Kiribati from 9 to 10 November 2010. The purpose of the conference was to support the initiative of the President of Kiribati, Anote Tong, to hold a consultative forum between vulnerable states and their partners with a view of creating an enabling environment for multi-party negotiations under the auspices of the UNFCCC.
- The 2010 United Nations Climate Change Conference was held in Cancún, Mexico, from 29 November to 10 December 2010.

=== December ===
- The 2010 Puebla oil pipeline explosion was a large oil pipeline explosion that occurred in the city of San Martín Texmelucan de Labastida, Puebla, Mexico.
- The Yellow River oil spill was an oil spill in the Yellow River in Shaanxi, China which took place due to the rupturing of a segment of Lanzhou-Zhengzhou oil pipeline
- Deforestation may have played a role in the landslide in the district of Bududa in eastern Uganda.

== See also ==
- Human impact on the environment
- List of environmental issues
- List of years in the environment
