= SS Sansinena =

Liberian oil tanker that exploded in Los Angeles harbor in 1976

Coordinates: 33°42′52″N 118°16′29″W

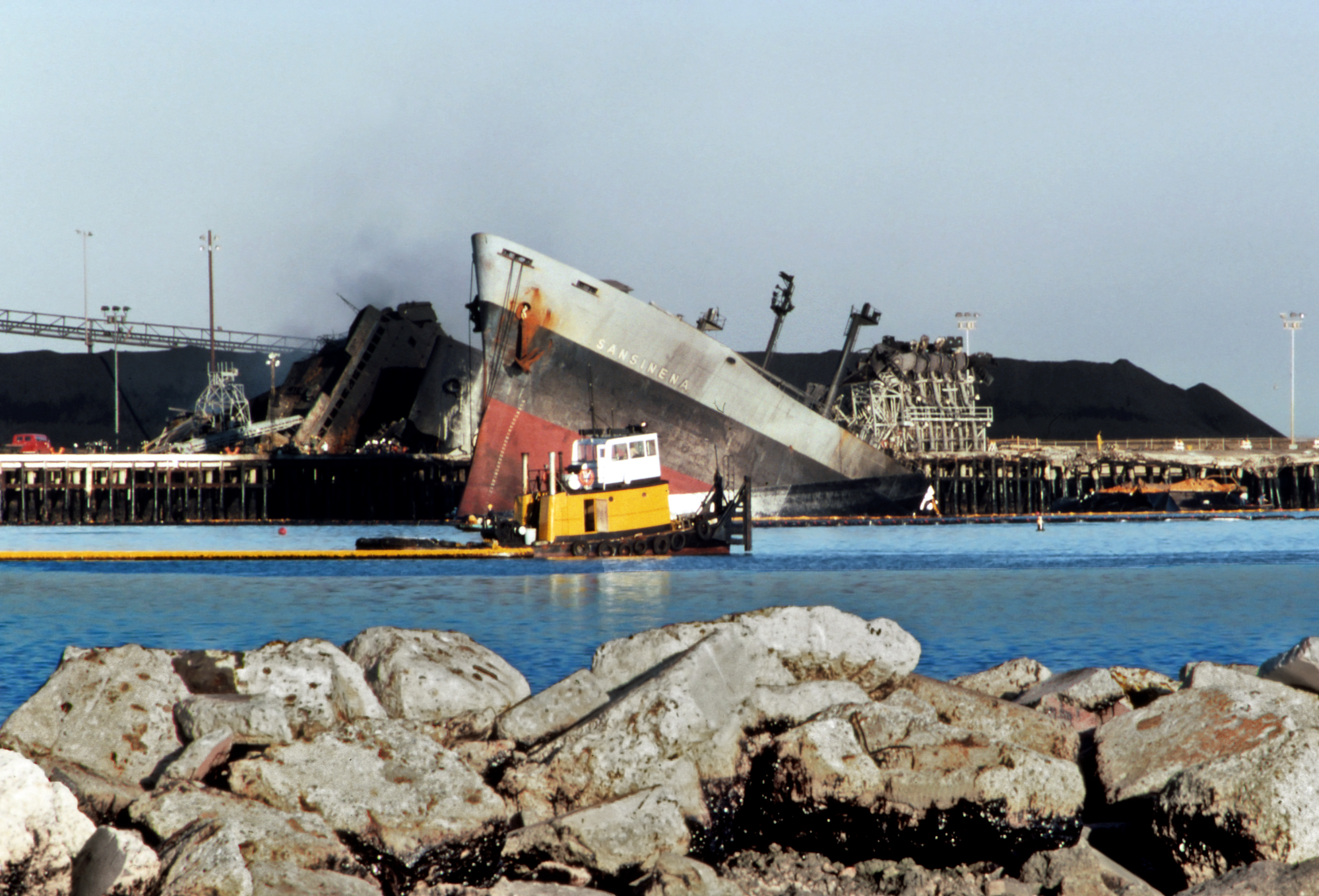
- Bow section SS Sansinena lies partially submerged at Berth 46 after it exploded while refueling

History
- Owner: Barracuda Tankers
- Port of registry: Monrovia
- Launched: 7 August 1958
- Identification: IMO number: 5311650
- Fate: Destroyed by explosion 17 December 1976

General characteristics
- Type: Oil tanker
- Tonnage: 60,000 DWT
- Length: 810 ft (250 m)
- Beam: 104 ft (32 m)
- Draft: 42 ft (13 m)
- Capacity: 460,000 bbl (73,000 m^{3})

SS Sansinena was a Liberian oil tanker that exploded in Los Angeles harbor on 17 December 1976 at 7:33pm. She was docked at berth 46 at Port of Los Angeles in San Pedro, California.

The vessel was a steamship built in 1958. At its final port of call, Sansinena had discharged its cargo of crude oil and was taking on ballast and fuel when a massive explosion split the ship in half and obliterated multiple port buildings. The blast shattered windows for miles around, flung the entire midship bridge on the wharf, and triggered a fire that spread across the dock and around the tanker. The Los Angeles Fire Department soon arrived on the scene to contain the blaze and rescue survivors. One of the fires, fed by underground fuel lines, burned for four days.

A United States Coast Guard investigation later concluded that the incident was caused by flammable hydrocarbon vapor buildup on the deck of the ship caused by a poorly designed and deteriorating venting system as well as an unsafe practice (leaving all vents open during ballasting). The ignition source was never identified.

The official casualty count was:

- 9 dead (eight crew and one dock security guard).
- 46 injured, 9 requiring hospitalization.

The explosion of Sansinena and technical details of the incident were featured as the first segment of the Engineering Disasters in an episode of History Channel's Modern Marvels television series.

The winter of 1976–77 was a particularly bad period of oil spills and ship accidents in the US. MV Argo Merchant, SS Grand Zenith, MV Hawaiian Patriot and other ships had incidents at this time. The United States' National Oceanic and Atmospheric Administration began a spill response program in response to these events.

== See also ==
- Ralph J. Scott (fireboat)
