= Los Andes vs Prueba =

1820 single ship action

- Part of the Spanish American Wars of Independence
Date	Chilean historiography: May 12 and 13, 1820; Spanish historiography: May 14 and 15, 1820
Location	At the height of the Esmeraldas River / Cape Manglares and the island of Gorgona, Viceroyalty of New Granada (present-day Ecuador and Colombia)
Result	Indecisive

Belligerents
Republic of Chile	(Spain) Spanish Monarchy: Viceroyalty of Peru

Commanders and leaders
Juan Illingworth (WIA)	Antonio Vacaro

Strength
1 corvette (24 guns)	1 frigate (48 guns)

Casualties and losses
Unknown	Unknown

Los Andes vs Prueba was a single ship action fought in 1820, during the development of the Spanish American Wars of Independence. The battle was between the corvette Los Andes (Note: It is usually called in two ways: Los Andes or Rosa de los Andes.) and the frigate Prueba, the first a Chilean privateer and the second a ship of the Spanish Navy. It lasted two days and occurred in two different places. There are differences between Chilean and Spanish historiography on the exact date, the starting place, the development and the result of the naval action.

== Background ==
=== Privateer incursion of the Los Andes ===
On April 25, 1819, Los Andes sailed from Valparaíso with the purpose of harassing the royalists in the Pacific. The ship was commanded by Captain Juan Illingworth, a British sailor in the service of Chile. Between May and September he ventured to navigate the coasts that extend from Peru to Panama. He won some prizes, attacked coastal populations and successfully rejected warships that wanted to catch him.

From October of that year until March 1820, he harassed the Pacific coast of New Granada to support General Simón Bolívar to gain control of the territory. Their attacks were concentrated in the towns of the coast of Popayán and in the valley of Cauca. He defeated the royalist detachments and left the territory under revolutionary authority.

=== The Prueba sails to Guayaquil ===
Realistic naval power in the Pacific was located in Callao, in the Viceroyalty of Peru. For those moments, the Chilean Navy had the preponderance of the sea, which complicated the realistic defense that was prepared in the viceroyalty due to the imminent invasion of the organized military force in Chile.

In the midst of these circumstances, on April 22, 1820, a convoy commanded by Commodore Antonio Vacaro sailed from Callao to Guayaquil, bringing a battalion to reinforce the place. This naval force was formed by the frigate Prueba (flagship), the brig Maypú and the transport Javiera. On May 1, the convoy arrived at the site and Vacaro had news of the Chilean ship on those coasts.

== Previous movements ==
On May 6, Vacaro left Guayaquil with the Prueba and the Maypú, both warships, to cross the sea to Panama, in search of the privateer. In the first days they did not obtain news of their whereabouts, and a week later, the brig had to return to Guayaquil due to a breakdown in the rigging. Vacaro continued alone with his frigate sailing through Santa Elena, Montecristi and the entrance of the Esmeraldas River to get news.

On the other hand, Los Andes had left the coasts of New Granada after having established revolutionary authority. He intended to undertake new raids against the royalists.

== Forces ==
=== Chilean privateer ===
Name ship	Commander	Type	Displacement	Crew	Guns
Los Andes	Juan Illingworth	Corvette	400 t	151 men	24 carronades of 12 and 18 pounds

When leaving Valparaíso, the corvette was manned by approximately 270 men, but had declined during the naval campaign, having at the time of the battle only 151 men, of whom 35 were sick. In addition, of the 36 guns that it had at the beginning, there were 30, of which only 24 were in operation due to the lack of crew.

=== Spanish ship ===
Name ship	Commander	Type	Displacement	Crew	Guns
Prueba	Antonio Vacaro	Frigate	Unknown (Note: Spanish historiography does not mention the tonnage of the Prueba. There are no records in the Spanish Navy of its maritime qualities before or after construction.)	Unknown	28 guns of 24 pounds
Prueba	Antonio Vacaro	Frigate	Unknown	Unknown	8 guns of 12 pounds
Prueba	Antonio Vacaro	Frigate	Unknown	Unknown	8 howitzers of 24 pounds
Prueba	Antonio Vacaro	Frigate	Unknown	Unknown	4 howitzers of 3 pounds

In addition to the personnel of the frigate, he had as reinforcement a company of the Numancia battalion that embarked on his departure from Guayaquil.

== Battle ==
Location of the battle area, between the current Ecuador and Colombia.

The battle was fought in two different places. Given the great differences between Chilean and Spanish historiography, the narrative will be separate.

=== At the height of the Esmeraldas River / Cape Manglares ===
(Chilean Historiography): on May 12, Los Andes was sailing at the height of Esmeraldas River, when it suddenly saw the Prueba to the northwest. Soon after, Illingworth learned that it was the Spanish frigate and approached her with the intention of carrying out an attack by boarding. Nevertheless, the Spanish ship, taking advantage of the speed and the greater scope of the artillery that it owned, dodged the closed fight during two hours to stay out of reach. Faced with this dangerous situation for the corvette, decided to retire to the coast of New Granada dominated by revolutionaries, aware that the frigate would pursue him.

(Spanish historiography): at noon on May 14, at the height of Cape Manglares, the Prueba spotted the Chilean corvette towards the windward. Both approached with the intention of recognizing themselves, until at three in the afternoon, a league away, the Chilean ship turned around and changed the British flag that had until then, raising the Chilean flag. This allowed Vacaro to know who his rival was. He chased him until nightfall, when he lost sight of him because of the darkness.

=== In front of the island of Gorgona ===
(Chilean historiography): the Spanish frigate followed the waters of the Chilean corvette during the night, and on May 13, at the end of the afternoon, they met again. The Spanish ship continued the attack from a distance, but a bad maneuver brought it too close to the Chilean ship, which increased the chances of success of the latter. After two hours of sustained struggle, Illingworth is able to position himself to carry out a boarding attack, as he wished. However, he receives a wound that forces him to leave the command post. Due to this accident, the privateer loses its advantageous attack situation and the Spaniard takes advantage of the setback to escape the place, but not before having received two discharge of the Chilean battery, taking it in line. This would have caused serious damage to the frigate on the deck, ending the battle.

(Spanish historiography): at dawn on May 15, the Spanish frigate found the Chilean corvette five leagues to the leeward, pursuing it until nightfall, when the battle was resumed near the Gorgona Island. The frigate came close enough to shoot him with double ammunition. The naval action would extend for more than an hour. The corvette had the suspicion that the Spaniard was stranded and sought his stern to prevent it from sinking and capture him in good condition. There was no such varadura, and ready the artillery of the frigate, received the fire directly given the proximity. The corvette suffered so much damage that it retreated without even firing a shot. His commander was also considered dead. Vacaro could not chase him because he had the reefs of Gorgona under the prow of the ship, to which the darkness of the night and the rain is added.

== Conclusion ==
There are also differences about the conclusion of the battle.

Spanish historiography indicates that at dawn on May 16, Vacaro recognized the anchorages of Gorgona with the Prueba, and not finding the Los Andes, went to the Popayán, where he discovered the adversary entering the mouth of the Iscuandé river. He tried to follow it, but the ground below prevented it, so he sent three boats to explore, but did not find the corvette and claimed that her crew was on land. Finally, Vacaro abandoned the persecution and returned to Gorgona to refuel and then sail to Peru.

Chilean historiography does not mention the persecution of the Spanish frigate. Illingworth in his official part, written on May 30 aboard the corvette, does not indicate that he was persecuted. Later, when the Chilean ship left the Iscuandé to return to Chile, it ran aground at the entrance to the river and could not be refloated. (Note: After the loss of the corvette in the Iscuandé, Illingworth together with his officers and troops joined the army of Gran Colombia.)

== Bibliography ==
- Uribe, Luis (1891). Los Orígenes de Nuestra Marina Militar: Parte Primera (1817-1819) (in Spanish). Santiago, Chile: Imprenta Nacional.
- Pérez Turrado, Gaspar (1996). Las marinas realista y patriota en la independencia de Chile y Perú (in Spanish). Madrid, España: Ministerio de Defensa. ISBN 84-7823-496-9.
- Barros Arana, Diego (1892). Historia jeneral de Chile (in Spanish). Vol. XII. Santiago, Chile: Imprenta Cervantes.
- Ortiz Sotelo, Jorge (2015). La Real Armada en el Pacífico Sur. El Apostadero Naval del Callao 1746-1824. Capítulo 9 y Anexo 2 (in Spanish). México: Universidad Nacional Autónoma de México, Instituto de Investigaciones Históricas/Bonilla Artigas Editores. ISBN 978-607-8348-61-9.
