= Epic Colocotronis =

Epic Colocotronis was an oil tanker that caught fire and sank near Puerto Rico in 1975. The sinking of the Greek-flagged vessel resulted in an oil spill of an estimated 18,000,000 US gallons (68,000,000 L; 15,000,000 imp gal).

The crew abandoned the tanker after the 788-foot (240 m)‐long hull split, 60 miles (97 km) northwest of Puerto Rico. The New York Times reported the wreck and fire occurred on May 13, 1975, but the United States' National Oceanic and Atmospheric Administration (NOAA) dates the event to January 31 of that year.

The ship was owned by Colocotronis brothers of Greece and Great Britain, the same owners as the SS Zoe Colocotronis, which had also wrecked near Puerto Rico in 1973. Epic Colocotronis was built in 1965 by a French company, Construction Navale de Bordeaux. The ship was previously known as Hoegh Hood.

The Epic Colocotronis is among the largest oil spills in history. In a listing of the highest-volume oil spills affecting US waters since 1969, the NOAA lists the Epic Colocotronis spill as the fourth largest: only the Deepwater Horizon, Ixtoc 1 and MV Hawaiian Patriot spills are larger. Although it is a larger spill than Exxon Valdez, the Epic Colocotronis is much less well-known.
