= Mingbulak oil field =

Oil field in Fergana Valley, Uzbekistan

Coordinates: 40°48′43″N 71°29′19″E

The Mingbulak oil field is an oil field in the Fergana Valley in Uzbekistan. It was first developed in 1992, but abandoned after a massive oil spill. In 2010 it was scheduled to be exploited by Uzbekneftegaz.
