= Odyssey (tanker) =

Oil tanker that sank in the North Atlantic

History
- Name: Odyssey; Oriental Phoenix
- Owner: Polembros Shipping Ltd.
- Port of registry: Monrovia, Liberia
- Builder: JMU Kure Shipyard in Kure, Japan
- In service: 1971
- Out of service: November 10, 1988
- Identification: IMO number: 7122766
- Fate: Sank at 52.40N, 34.41W

General characteristics
- Class & type: Oil tanker

Odyssey, which previously went by the name Oriental Phoenix, was an oil tanker in operation from 1971 to November 10, 1988, when an explosion caused it to sink in the North Atlantic off the coast of Canada. The resulting spill remains one of the largest oil spills in world history. The tanker was 700 nautical miles (1,300 km; 810 mi) off the coast of the Canadian province of Nova Scotia when it sank and released 132,157 tons (43 million gallons) of oil into the ocean, valued at some $86.7 million (2010). By way of comparison, four times as much oil was spilled by the Odyssey as from the much more famous Exxon Valdez.

== Sinking ==
Built in 1971, this 65,000-ton tanker was operated by Polembros Shipping Ltd. of London, England, and registered in Liberia. In 1988, the ship had been newly sold to the Diamond Port Shipping Corporation and renamed the Odyssey. On November 5, 1988, the tanker departed Sullom Voe Terminal in the Shetland Islands off Scotland, fully loaded with North Sea Brent Crude oil which was being transported to the Come By Chance Refinery at Come-by-Chance, Newfoundland and Labrador.

When the ship was about 1000 nautical miles off the coast of Newfoundland, a major North Atlantic storm arose, buffeting the ship with 25-foot (7.6 m) waves and 44-mile-per-hour winds. In response, the ship sent out a distress signal and kept heading for shore. The distress call was received by Radio Valentia in Ireland and transferred to the Canadian Rescue Coordination Centre. The centre alerted the vessels in the area.

However, when the ship was 700 nautical miles (1,300 km) off the coast of Nova Scotia, an explosion occurred on board, causing the ship to break into two and begin sinking. As the ship sank, a fire broke out on its stern section, causing the oil on board to catch fire. A Russian weather ship, the Passat, responded to the Odyssey's distress call and was on site in less than an hour, travelling 26 miles to the scene. Once on site, however, it was unable to approach within one mile of the vessel, which was surrounded by ignited oil slicks.

All 27 crew members, 15 Greeks and 12 Hondurans, are presumed to have died during the incident. Because of hazardous weather conditions, the Canadian Coast Guard could not immediately reach the spill and much of the oil burned up before the coast guard reached the ship. A Canadian Forces plane that flew over the area before nightfall reported that the stern section had sunk, the bow section was just at the surface at that time, and the fire had died out.

== Environmental effects ==
In the immediate aftermath of the ship's sinking, the oil spill covered an area of 3 miles (4.8 km) x 10 miles (16 km). A much reduced amount of oil reached shore - in part because of the oil's rapid combustion from the initial explosion and in part because currents carried the spill across the Atlantic, in the direction of England, giving the oil a significant amount of time to dissipate in the rough seas. Because of this, no clean-up operation was mounted.

The Advisory Committee on Marine Pollution of the Sea of the International Council for the Exploration of the Sea published an analysis of the spill in their 1990 Marine Pollution Yearbook which noted that the spill likely had a significant effect on krill in the area, and through them, may have affected animals further up the food chain.

== See also ==
- Largest oil spills
- Ocean Odyssey Drilling Rig Blowout, an unrelated September 1988 explosion in the North Sea
