= 2014 Sundarbans oil spill =

Environmental disaster in Bangladesh

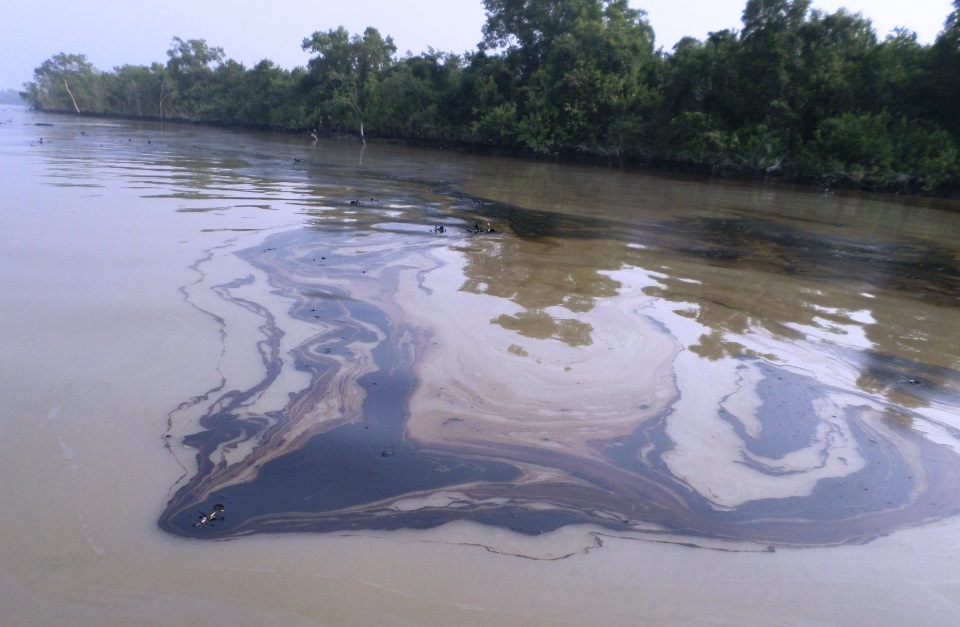
- Spilled oil on the Shela River
- Interactive map of 2014 Sundarbans oil spill
- Location: Shela River, Sundarbans, Khulna District, Bangladesh
- Coordinates: 22°21′51″N 89°40′1″E
- Date: 9 December 2014

Cause
- Cause: Collision between oil tanker and cargo vessel
- Operator: MS Harun & Co.

Spill characteristics
- Volume: 350,000 litres (77,000 imp gal; 92,000 US gal)
- Area: 350 km^{2} (140 sq mi)

The 2014 Sundarbans oil spill was an oil spill that occurred on 9 December 2014 at the Shela River in Sundarbans, Bangladesh, a UNESCO World Heritage Site. The spill occurred when an oil-tanker named Southern Star VII, carrying 350,000 litres (77,000 imp gal; 92,000 US gal) of furnace oil, was in collision with a cargo vessel and sank in the river. By 17 December, the oil had spread over a 350 km^{2} (140 sq mi) area. The oil spread to a second river and a network of canals in Sundarbans, which blackened the shoreline. The spill threatened trees, plankton, and vast populations of small fish and dolphins. The spill occurred at a protected mangrove area, home to rare Irrawaddy and Ganges river dolphins. By 12 January 2015, 70,000 litres (15,000 imp gal; 18,000 US gal) of oil had been cleaned up by local residents, the Bangladesh Navy, and the government of Bangladesh.

== Location ==
The collision between the oil tanker and the cargo vessel occurred at the Shela River in Sundarbans, Khulna Division, Bangladesh. The site is near Mongla Port, and is about 100 kilometres (62 mi) from Kolkata Port. The oil tanker was at anchor at the confluence between the Shela River and the Passur River in dense fog when the cargo vessel collided with it at 5am on 9 December 2014. The site is in a protected mangrove area, home to rare Irrawaddy and Ganges dolphins.

== Casualties and losses ==
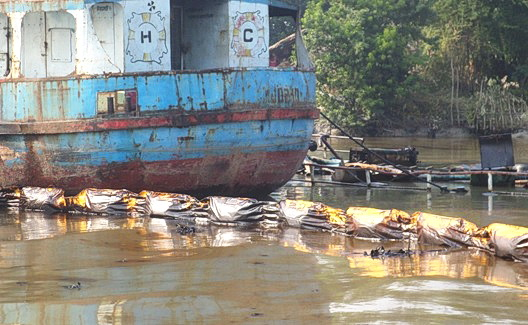
Salvaged oil tanker

Seven crew members of the sunken ship managed to swim ashore, but the captain of the ship, Mokhlesur Rahman, died, and his body was recovered a few kilometers away from the spot where the ship sank. Experts estimated that ৳1,000,000,000 was lost as a result of the sinking of the oil-tanker. The residents of the surrounding area are at a health risk. The government of Bangladesh told the local residents to collect the oil and sell it to the Bangladesh Petroleum Corporation. The local oil collectors faced health risks and various skin diseases, including hair fallout if furnace oil mixed with water contacts a person's face or hair.

== Environmental issues ==
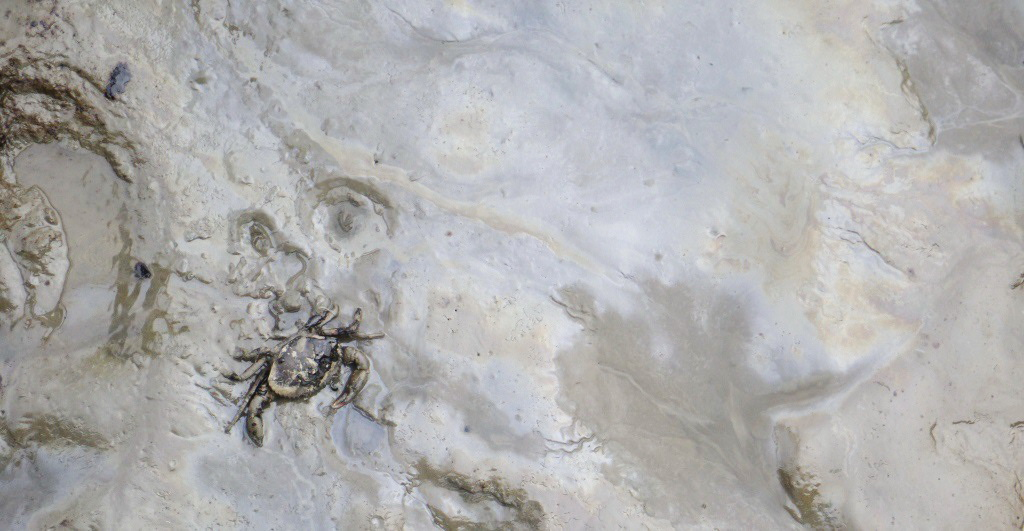
A dead crab and color interference pattern formed in the spilled oil.

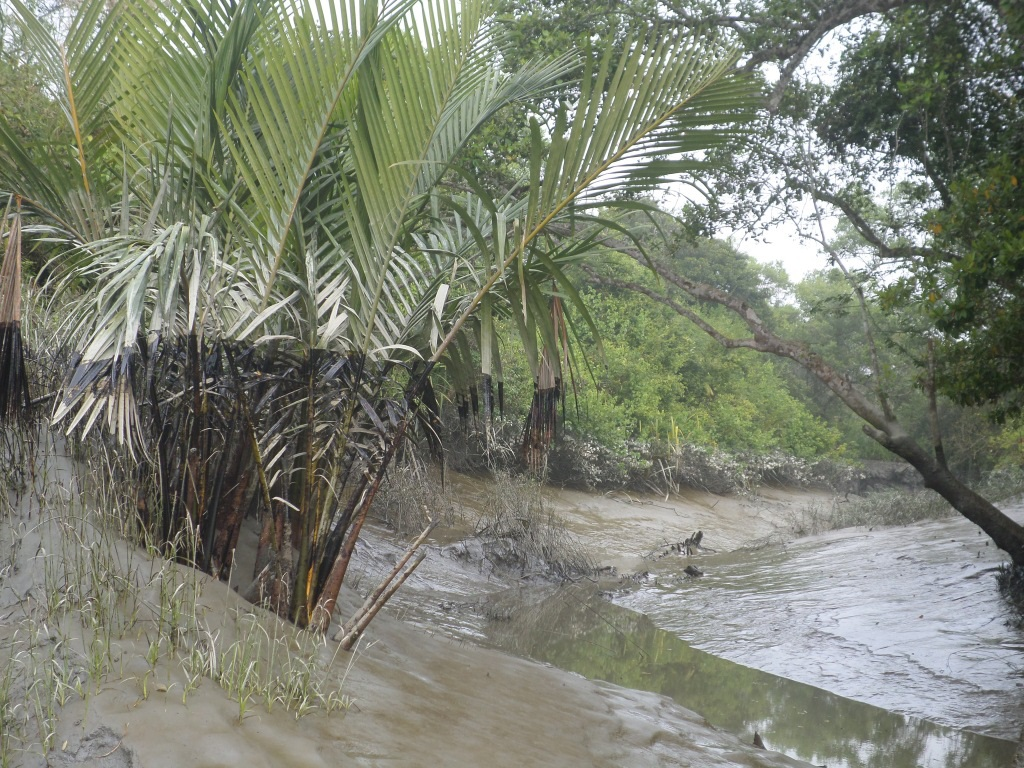
Oil covered trees

Environmentalists warned that the event was an ecological "catastrophe", as the spill occurred at a protected area where rare dolphins were present. Experts expressed concerns that the oil spill will hamper the well-being of the aquatic organisms in the area. Wildlife near the river are at a risk of death, because the smell of oil makes breathing difficult. Some images indicate that the disaster killed some animals.

On 13 December 2014, a dead Irrawaddy dolphin was seen floating on the Harintana-Tembulbunia channel of the Shela River. However, it was not confirmed that the dolphin's death was caused by the oil spill. According to the local residents, few dolphins have been seen in the area since the oil spill. The oriental small-clawed otter (Amblonyx cinereus) is an aquatic carnivorous animal that lives in the aquatic ecosystem of Sundarbans. On 18 December 2014, two dead otters were recovered from the Shela River by forest department workers. An autopsy of the two otters confirmed that they had died from ingesting oil. The otter is considered to be an endangered species, and has been included in the International Union for Conservation of Nature endangered list.

A team of forest department workers saw crocodiles, monitor lizards and many other animals smeared with oil at the Chandpai range of the Sundarbans.

The oil spill is also posing a major threat to the forest's food cycle. Reports from various sources showed that the microorganisms, the primary level of the food cycle, are dying. The United Nations expressed deep concern over the oil spill, urging the government of Bangladesh to impose a "complete ban" on commercial vessels moving through the forest.

Shajahan Khan, the shipping minister of Bangladesh, told Bangladesh Sangbad Sangstha that he has talked with environmental experts, and they said that there will likely be no major damage as a result of the oil spill. Researchers said that Khan's claim was "unscientific and misleading".

Ten species that are at risk as a result of the spill have been listed by The National Geographic Traveler. These species are the Irrawaddy dolphins, Bengal tigers, leopards, great egrets, rhesus macaques, northern river terrapins, black-capped kingfishers, chitals, saltwater crocodiles, and horseshoe crabs. The presence of white-rumped vulture (Gyps bengalensis) over the Sundarbans sky also indicated the large scale death of wild fauna. The secondary effect of oil spill is always much greater than the primary effects.

== Oil collection ==
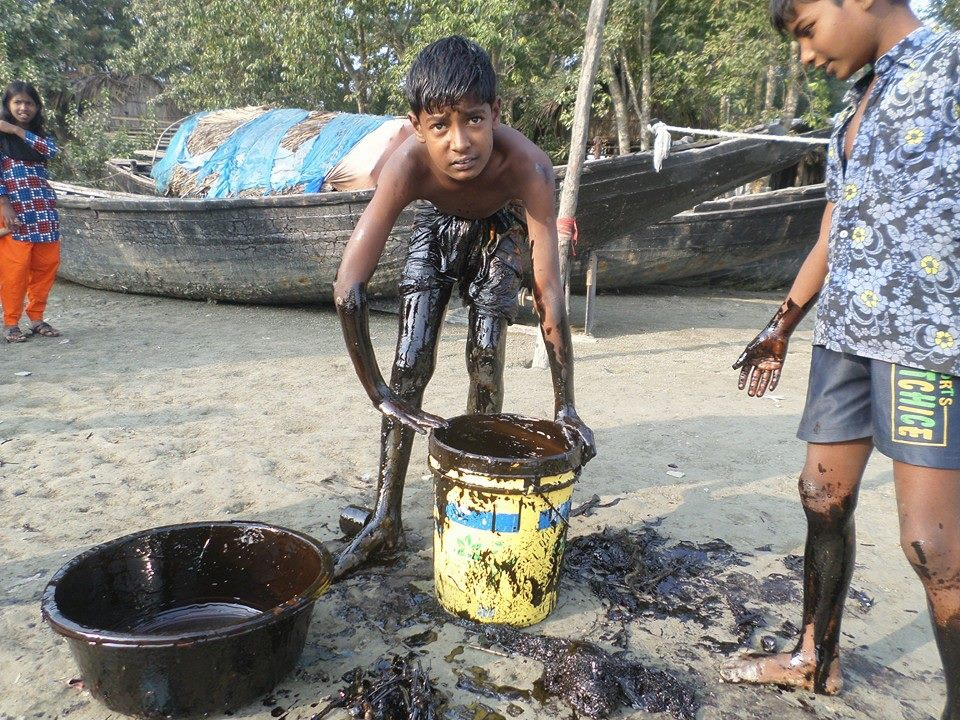
Local residents collecting oil

After the spill, primarily Bangladeshi fishermen began to clean up the oil using sponges and sacks. Padma Oil Company, a government-owned corporation, bought the oil at a price of 30 takas per litre. The Bangladeshi navy initially sent four ships to deal with the spill, and planned to use chemicals to disperse the oil, but the plan was canceled, as there were concerns that dispersing the oil would further damage the ecology and biodiversity of the mangrove forest. The government of Bangladesh closed the Shela River to all vessels. The owner of the sunken oil tanker, MS Harun & Co., began salvage efforts, assisted by three private rescue vessels. The Bangladesh Forest Department filed a 1 billion taka lawsuit against the owners of the two cargo ships involved in the collision. By 12 January 2015, the government, with the help of local residents, the Bangladesh Navy, and the owner of the oil tanker, had collected 70,000 litres (15,000 imp gal; 18,000 US gal) of oil. The Bangladesh government said that they do not have the capacity to manage oil spills.

The Economic Relations Division of the Bangladesh government sent a letter to the United Nations' Bangladesh office on 15 December 2014, asking for help in the oil collection efforts. The United Nations accepted the request, and a team from the UNEP and OCHA went to the site of the spill. A team from the United Nations Disaster Assessment and Coordination arrived in the Dhaka to support the cleanup efforts.

== See also ==
- Rampal Power Station
- List of oil spills
