= Global Universities Partnership on Environment and Sustainability =

International partnership among universities

Global Universities Partnership on Environment for Sustainability (GUPES)

Information
- Established: 2010
- Website: Global Universities Partnership on Environment for Sustainability (GUPES)

The Global Universities Partnership on Environment for Sustainability (GUPES) is a United Nations Environment Program (UNEP) flagship programme, hosted by the Environmental Education and Training Unit (EETU), at the UNEP Headquarters in Nairobi, Kenya. The partnership seeks to increase active environmental commitment and action with higher education institutions and policy institutions globally.

== Origin ==
GUPES was established in 2010, after a UNEP led consultative forum with partners. The partnership builds on the accomplishments of the Mainstreaming Environment and Sustainability in African Universities (MESA), the Mainstreaming Environment and Sustainability in the Caribbean Universities, and the Asia-Pacific Regional University Consortium (RUC).

GUPES was launched in June 2012 at the UNEP – Tongji Institute for Environment and Sustainability in Shanghai, China. At present (March 2015), over 530 global universities subscribe to the partnership.

== Goal ==
GUPES serves to increase the mainstreaming of environment and sustainability practices and curricula into universities around the world. It is also geared towards encouraging further interaction between UNEP and universities, around the three pillars of education, training and applied research. This is done in accordance to the UN Decade of Education for Sustainable Development (UNDESD) of 2004–2015; the Rio+20 Summit outcome document – The Future We Want; the UNESCO Global Action Programme (GAP) on Education for Sustainable Development in collaboration with United Nations University (UNU); United Nations Educational, Scientific and Cultural Organization (UNESCO) and partners.

== Pillars ==
GUPES is based on three "pillars": education, training and networking.

- Education - Focuses on inspiring, mentoring, informing, supporting, facilitating and enabling universities to undertake curriculum innovations for sustainability as well as greening of universities.
- Training - Enhances applied competence by enhancing knowledge and awareness on UNEP’s priority areas as well as equipping the target audience (mainly mid-level managers and policy makers) with the relevant skills, values and attitudes on key environment agenda, issues and emerging concepts through scheduled training courses in universities as well as environment and sustainability seminars and leadership programmes.
- Networking - Encourages and strengthens regional and sub-regional higher education networks on environment and sustainability modeled around continents, UNEP regions as well as North-South and South-South cooperation. It further establishes linkages with other higher education initiatives for sustainability globally and recognizes programmes of excellence.

== Statistics (as of March 2015) ==
Region	Members
Africa	95
Asia-Pacific	77
Europe	102
Latin America & Caribbean	228
North America	9
West Asia	1
Partners	22
Total Members	534

== See also ==
- 2010 in the environment
- Education for Sustainable Development
- Sustainable Development
- United Nations Educational Scientific and Cultural Organization
