= MV Hawaiian Patriot =

Oil tanker lost in 1977

MV Hawaiian Patriot was an oil tanker that sank in the Pacific Ocean in 1977 with the loss of her cargo and one crewmember. In the United States National Oceanic and Atmospheric Administration (NOAA)'s listing of oil spills affecting US waters since 1969, the Hawaiian Patriot spill is the third-largest as of 2025; only the Ixtoc I and Deepwater Horizon oil spills were larger.

Hawaiian Patriot was 258 metres (846 ft 5 in) long and measured 51,479 gross register tons (GRT). She was powered by a single 23,000-brake-horsepower (17,000 kW) diesel engine that gave her a speed of 16.5 knots (30.6 km/h; 19.0 mph). She was built in 1965 by Mitsui Bussan as Borgila for Fred. Olsen & Co. In 1973, she was sold to Marine Transport Lines and renamed Oswego Patriot, and in 1975 Indo-Pacific Carriers purchased her and gave her the name Hawaiian Patriot. At the time of her loss, she was registered in Liberia.

On February 23, 1977, Hawaiian Patriot was sailing from Indonesia to Honolulu, Hawaii, with a cargo of 714,000 barrels (30,000,000 US gal; 113,500,000 L) of crude oil when she reported a hull breach about 360 miles (580 km) west of Honolulu. The following day, she suffered a huge explosion and the crew abandoned the ship, which burned for several hours before sinking. 38 of the 39 crewmembers were rescued by the cargo ship Philippine Bataan, which had reached the scene. The sinking left an estimated 50,000 tonnes of oil in the water, but no cleanup response took place as currents moved the slick west and it did not make landfall. The lost cargo was valued at $12 million by insurer Fireman's Fund Insurance Company.

The winter of 1976–1977 was a particularly bad period of oil spills and ship accidents in the US. MV Argo Merchant, SS Grand Zenith, SS Sansinena and other ships had accidents at this time. NOAA's began a spill response program in response to these events.
