= ABT Summer =

Oil tanker that burned and sank in 1991

MV ABT Summer was an oil tanker which was built at the South Korean shipbuilding yard of Ulsan and launched in 1974. The vessel was 344 meters in length and almost 54 meters in breadth. While under a Liberian flag, fully laden with Iranian crude and en route to Rotterdam, she sank 700 nautical miles (1,300 km; 810 mi) off the Angolan coast. An unexplained explosion occurred on May 28, 1991, and the ship and its cargo began to burn. Five of the crew of thirty-two were killed in the incident, four of whom were initially reported as missing. The following day, a slick 32 kilometres (20 mi) long and 7 kilometres (4.3 mi) wide began to form. The ship continued to burn for three days before sinking on June 1. The vessel's 260,000 tonne cargo of oil was lost, leaving a visible slick on the ocean surface of approximately eighty square miles. Attempts to locate the wreck following the incident proved unsuccessful.

== See also ==
- List of oil spills
