= Mobil Nigeria oil spill =

The Mobil oil spill of Nigeria occurred in Akwa Ibom State, Nigeria, on 12 January 1998, when a pipeline at Mobil's Idoho platform burst underwater, sending 40,000 barrels of oil spilling into the ocean. Drifting westwards, the oil covered 850 km (520 miles) of the Nigerian coastline, contaminating water and negatively impacting fishing in the region. Only 1% of the spill reached the shore, largely due to favorable weather conditions as well as Mobil's response to the situation. In the year 2016, a Federal High Court in Lagos Nigeria, ruled against Mobil for US$32 million in damages.

== Effects ==
On 12 January 1998, a 24-inch pipeline on Mobil's Idoho platform in Akwa Ibom burst, spilling 40,000 barrels of Qua Iboe light crude oil into the Niger River Delta. The oil covered sections of Nigeria and the Republic of Benin's coastline, and drifted westwards, extending as far as 900 km away in Lagos Harbor. In total, 500 barrels (21,000 gallons) of oil washed ashore. The affected shoreline areas suffered medium to heavy impact, but were limited to only a small number of locations around the coast, including two mangrove environments.

Despite the relatively small amount of oil washed ashore, the spill had a heavy impact on fishing communities and cooperatives in the region, leading to many being unable to fish as well as others losing occupational tools such as nets due to oil damage.

== Cleanup Effort ==
Mobil responded with a range of equipment to clean the spill, including boats, skimmers, and coastal protection equipment. Warm weather and favorable tides also made it so that much of the oil stayed off the coastline and evaporated, and this was aided by the use of dispersants through helicopters and boats. This led to 60% of the spilled oil naturally dispersing. Containment boons and oil skimmers were also used to control the remaining spilled oil. On land, beaches underwent self-cleaning via natural processes within 2–4 weeks. Later, Mobil began cleanup operations led by trained supervisors in affected villages, and invited experts from Lagos University and the United States to assist in the cleanup process. However, Human Rights Watch reports indicate shoreline cleanup had not begun by 28 January, more than two weeks after the spill had occurred, and even by March some affected sites remained contaminated.

Cleanup efforts in heavily affected shoreline areas ultimately yielded approximately 1000 barrels of oily waste, amounting to 100 barrels of actual oil. Although short-term environmental impact studies were conducted by Mobil, long-term studies as originally promised were never published on the impacts of the spill.

== Response ==
The spill prompted widespread backlash from local residents and groups, particularly those located at the estuary of the Pennington River, who were the hardest hit. In total, approximately 14,000 claims for reparations were made, totalling over US$100 million. Fishermen and locals in nearby Eket protested, going as far as to hold employees of Mobil hostage in order to demand compensation. Protests were particularly abundant amongst fishermen, many of whom were left with nets that were clogged with oil and unusable, which Mobil then burned after inspections to prevent them from being reused.

On January 19 and 20, a near-riot broke out in a protest led by local youth in order to have Mobil Nigeria establish a claims office in Eket. Protestors numbered in the thousands and negotiations took over nine hours, but meetings between demonstration leaders and Mobil representatives proved fruitful and a claims office was subsequently established. The protest against Mobil Nigeria, however, led to the arrests of up to 300 protestors.

In July 1998, eleven men were shot and killed by police during protests for reparations in Warri, Delta State.

On 1 May 2010, another spill occurred in a Mobil (now ExxonMobil) pipeline in Akwa Ibom State, this time spilling over a million gallons of oil and taking seven days to stop. Reports indicated that the pipelines carrying the crude to Qua Iboe Terminal are "dilapidated and decrepit" and were in need of replacement.

On 16 December 2016, a Federal High Court in Lagos, Nigeria ordered Mobil Nigeria to pay US$32 million in damages to the fishermen affected by the spill, citing a violation of their right to life and right to live in an environment favorable to their socioeconomic development.
