= Red Butte Creek oil spill =

- Interactive map of Red Butte Creek oil spill
- Location: Red Butte Creek; Salt Lake City, Utah
- Coordinates: 40.76619°N 111.82647°W
- Date: 11 June 2010 – 12 June 2010

Cause
- Cause: Ruptured pipeline
- Operator: Chevron Corporation

Spill characteristics
- Volume: 33,000 L (7,300 imp gal; 8,700 US gal)
- Area: Red Butte Creek, Jordan River, Liberty Park
- Shoreline impacted: 5 km (3.1 mi)

The Red Butte Creek oil spill was caused by a rupture in a medium crude oil pipeline that occurred on June 11 and 12 2010. The Chevron Pipeline (CPL) is 10 inches in diameter and runs from western Colorado to a Chevron Corporation oil refinery near Salt Lake City Utah. A half-inch diameter hole in the pipeline was caused by an electrical arc from high voltage power lines to a metal fence post buried a few inches above the pipeline.

== Description ==
Red Butte Creek is an urban stream that is heavily controlled by dams and reservoirs. It flows through natural channels, urban parks (including the lake in Liberty Park), and buried culverts, emptying into the Jordan River. Oil began spewing from the pipeline sometime around 10 pm local time that Friday in the vicinity of Red Butte Garden in Salt Lake City. Several hours after detection of pressure reduction in the line, the broken pipe was discovered flowing 50 to 60 US gallons (190 to 230 L; 42 to 50 imp gal) of oil per minute into the Red Butte Creek. Roughly 800 barrels (33,600 gallons) of oil were released, approximately 400 were recovered on land, and 400 entered into the creek. Crews contained the flow before it was able to reach the Great Salt Lake. Three miles of the creek were significantly oiled and required cleanup treatment. Oil began spewing from the pipeline sometime around 10 pm local time that Friday in the vicinity of Red Butte Garden in Salt Lake City. Residents were immediately warned to stay away from Red Butte Canyon, and Liberty Park was shut down for the day. Clean up efforts were conducted by the Chevron Corporation along with the city of Salt Lake's Fire Department, Police Department, and Public Utilities Department. Crews used absorbent booms and created dams to contain the majority of the spill. Utilizing many oilfield service companies, including 221 personnel, two-thirds of the total spill was recovered within the first week of the rupture. Affected wildlife were transported to Hogle Zoo for treatment. As of 9 September 2010 a total of 778 of the 800 barrels were accounted for through recovery from water, soil removal, and evaporation. It is worth noting that this spill occurred amidst the responses to the BP Deepwater Horizon and the Kalamazoo River spill. The Red Butte Creek spill received reduced attention despite it being one of the largest to occur in Region 8 in some time. In addition, the proximity of permanent residences leads to a greater potential impact on public health in the area.

== The Geographic Area ==
Red Butte Creek in Salt Lake City, Utah is a narrow rocky creek between City Creek to the north and Emigration Creek to the south. It is divided into two parts by the Red Butte Gardens, namely Upper Butte Creek and Lower Butte Creek. Lower Red Butte Creek passes through urban areas and discharges into Liberty Park Lake at Liberty Park. This portion of the creek was affected by the spill. One of the Lower Creek's functions is as an urban stormwater conveyance system. The Red Butte Reservoir regulates the flow of Lower Butte Creek. High flow instances affect the distribution of chemicals as well as biotic communities within the creek. Approximately 50 to 86 percent of the soils lining the banks of Red Butte have severe erosion potential.

== Vegetation ==
The most common trees along the streamside are box elder and cottonwood as well as the Siberian elm, which was an introduced invasive species. Canopy cover is generally high, but it is visibly reduced in the lower urban areas. Common shrub species include red osier dogwood, twinberry honeysuckle, and narrow leaf willow with Woods' rose common on upper portions of slopes.

== Wildlife ==
A managed population of native Bonneville cutthroat trout inhabits the Upper Red Butte Creek while there are no reports of the Lower Butte Creek supporting a fishery (aside from the few trout likely stocked by residents for fishing). In the affected area more than 30 different species of birds have been observed along with deer, raccoon, and skunk along the urban creek bed.

=== Impact of the Spill ===
The Red Butte Creek oil spill rendered several city-owned lands unusable during 2010. These lands included Liberty Park, Miller Park, Sunnyside Park, and various trails and infrastructure, which lost income due to the spill. The stormwater sewer system in the area was physically damaged by the oil release and system and had to be repaired. A thick, tacky substance was clinging to rocks, soil, fish, and birds in the riparian corridor where the spill occurred. Roughly 300 birds, mostly Canada geese, were oiled along with reports of dead fish along the waterway. The birds were herded into temporary corrals and transported to the Hogle zoo for cleaning. Some may even need to be transferred to a wildlife rehabilitation center. In addition, A local fish known as the June sucker fish reportedly endangered in since 1986 inhabits the Butte Creek Reservoir and could have also been affected by the spill.

=== Reactions ===
Drastically different reactions about the spill and cleanup efforts are circling. US Representative Jim Matheson believes Chevron "is responding very aggressively to [the spill]… they know there is a heightened concern among people in this country about oil spills…they understand it's in their best interest to do everything they can to fix this." Salt Lake City Mayor, Ralph Becker, attests that he "will do all [he] can to ensure our city's natural assets are restored…the city is not going to rest until we see the cleanup through." Local residents, however, are less hopeful. Those who live along the creek saw it turn black over a day. One resident even stated "Whatever is in that creek will die…I have so little faith in the oil companies to take care of this."

=== Cleanup Efforts ===
Unified Command (UC), consisting of the U.S. Environmental Protection Agency (EPA), five state and county agencies, and the Responsible Party (RP), determined the priority of the cleanup effort would be the "macro-invertebrate community in the sediment and the large trees and vegetation along the shore." This focus led the team to select a low-impact response method to minimize erosion of the bank. The UC decided that leaving some staining on rocks and culverts was acceptable if it meant protection of the riparian corridor and the vegetated canopy. The UC knew the local ecosystem due to a recent survey of the riparian area, which facilitated consensus on a cleanup endpoint.

== Responsibility ==
The CPL is primarily responsible for the cleanup efforts of the Red Butte Creek area. The company has expended approximately $26,886,000 as of July 31, 2011, on remediation efforts. A huge concern of the cleanup effort was that it be done correctly. Removing oil can create a multitude of problems if it is not handled properly. Oil forced into the creek beds and soils can destroy the natural habitat that a host of wildlife depends on. The substance also affects waterfowl's natural water resilience and can contaminate algae, which is eaten by the animals and fish in the stream. Chevron sent in an investigation team from Houston and a special hotline has been set up to field complaints and questions from residents.

=== Methods ===
Response measures included maintaining boom operations and deploying emergency response equipment. The primary method of cleanup for the creek was to flood and drain the impacted area twice through manipulation of the many dams and reservoirs along its path. Workers on foot would flush the channel banks using backpack sprayers and floating pumps following each intentional flooding. Restoration of the riparian corridor included restoring vegetation, stabilizing banks, and re-introducing native trout. Surface water, sediment, and bank samples were analyzed for total petroleum hydrocarbons (TPH), volatile organic compounds, semi-volatile organic compounds and grain size and total organic carbon in soil and sediments. Reference creeks expected to have similar environmental conditions as Lower Red Butte Creek in the absence of the incident were used to characterize a reasonable endpoint state for cleanup efforts.

=== Habitat Restoration ===
Several biotas were considered of high interest in maintaining the natural flow of in-creek and riparian habitats. Some in-creek biota include aquatic plants, invertebrates, fish, amphibians, and benthic macroinvertebrates, while biota essential to the riparian ecosystem were reptiles, waterfowl, and mammals. If these guilds are maintained the habitat is expected to successfully recover. The number of species and the complexity of biological communities render complete assessment of all biota impossible. Indicator species were used to infer potential adverse impacts to the population as a whole. Indicator species for the Lower Red Butte Creek environmental assessment include the mallard, the spotted sandpiper, the muskrat and the raccoon. The mallard was used to assess potential risk to birds that consume riparian emergent plants, while the sandpiper was used to assess risk for birds consuming benthic macroinvertebrates. Substances of direct concern for offsetting the survival of these biota included pollution in surface water, creek bed sediments and creek soil.

== Settlement ==
While the Red Butte Creek oil spill has had severe environmental effects on areas of Salt Lake City, another oil spill occurred in December of the same year. The damages from both spills were assessed and Chevron agreed to a settlement payout of $4.5 million. The breakdown of this payment is as follows: The City of Salt Lake: $508,000, The Department of Environmental Quality (DEQ): $462,853, The University of Utah: $1,304,000, Liberty Park Lake: expenditure of $2,300,000 for restoration, third parties: $929,000, civil penalty to PHMSA: $424,000, and mitigation of wildlife impacts: $100,000.

== Pipeline Safety in the Salt Lake Valley Report ==
Concern over the reoccurrence of an environmental disaster of this magnitude left some questioning the regulation of all Utah pipelines. A report was commissioned by Salt Lake City and released by the nonprofit, national Pipeline Safety Trust. Presentation of this report occurred on Wednesday, September 12 from 5:15 – 6:30 p.m. at the Chase Mill at Tracy Aviary. Mayor Becker invited the public to listen to Carl Weimer, executive director of the Pipeline Safety Trust in Bellingham, Washington present his findings and recommendations for the area.

== Problems with Utah Pipeline Regulation ==
The report claimed that state and federal regulators could do more to ensure pipeline safety. It calls for oil companies to be more forthcoming in regards to pipeline operations and inspections. In addition, municipalities can take more responsibility in training first responders in case of such an event. The report places most of the blame on the state of Utah itself. The report reads, "Although the federal government is responsible for setting minimum pipeline safety standards, Utah can adopt additional or stricter safety standards." Suggestions for the state legislature include expanding state authority to incorporate all hazardous liquid pipelines and interstate gas transmissions, creating a citizen pipeline safety advisory committee to work with the pipeline industry and regulators on a regular basis, and require excavators and underground utility operators to report all incidents of damage to a pipeline to the Division of Public Utilities. In addition to state legislature improvement, local governments in the Salt Lake Valley could adopt recommendations regarding planning near pipelines from Pipelines and Informed Planning Alliance (PIPA) Report to include at minimum a consultation zone and inclusion of transmission pipelines on planning and zoning maps, ensure emergency response teams have the required equipment, information and training to respond in case of a pipeline emergency, and develop an evacuation plan should an emergency occur. Many improvements to the system are suggested in the report, as there is high probability of another pipeline failure in Utah. From 2002 to 2011 there were 10 reported incidents of failure in the pipeline systems.

== Future Prospects ==
In addition to the public report Salt Lake City held a two-hour "Pipeline 101" workshop along with a two-day pipeline safety conference. Chevron looked into the possibility of rerouting the pipeline that was built in the 1950s. The reroute would take the pipeline outside the city limits, but its placement would them be on more rugged terrain. In addition, if a break in the pipeline did occur there would be limited access to mend it. The pipeline is not shut down forever. A 24-hour test under high-pressure conditions deemed it usable. Chevron is going to let the oil flow once again through the Red Butte Creek area.

== See also ==
- List of oil spills
- List of pipeline accidents in the United States in the 21st century
