= Ash Coulee =

Valley in South Dakota, United States

Coordinates: 45°12′28″N 103°41′51″W

Ash Coulee is a valley in the U.S. state of South Dakota.

Ash Coulee named for the ash trees in the coulee.
