= Mingbulak oil spill =

The Mingbulak oil spill, also known as the Fergana Valley oil spill, was the worst terrestrial oil spill in the history of Asia.

The oil spill was caused by a blowout on March 2, 1992 at the Mingbulak oil field in the Fergana Valley, Uzbekistan at well #5. The crude oil released from the well burned for two months. The blowout resulted in the release of 35,000 barrels (5,600 m^{3}) to 150,000 barrels (24,000 m^{3}) per day. In total, 2,000,000 barrels (320,000 m^{3}) were collected behind emergency dykes. The oil stopped flowing by itself. A total of 285,000 tons of oil were released, and it was the fifth largest oil spill in history. The spill is considered the largest inland spill in history. It cost over $55 million to clean the oil.

== See also ==
- List of oil spills
