= SS Puerto Rican =

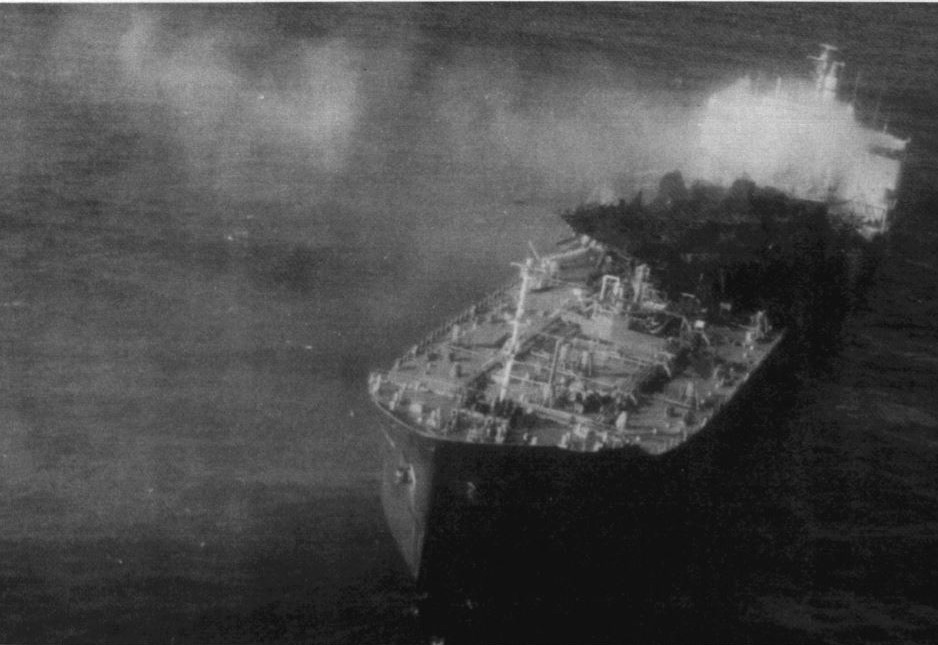
- SS Puerto Rican under tow on October 31, 1984, approximately 15.5 miles (24.9 km) southwest of Point Bonita.

History
- Name: Puerto Rican
- Owner: Bankers Trust Company
- Operator: Keystone Shipping
- Port of registry: New York, NY
- Builder: Bethlehem Steel Company, Sparrows Point, Maryland
- Yard number: 4633
- Launched: March 19, 1971
- Completed: October 8, 1971 (delivery)
- Identification: Official number: 535000
- Notes: Ship chartered to PPG Industries, Inc., Pittsburgh, PA

General characteristics
- Type: LPG supertanker
- Tonnage: 20,295 GRT, 34,400 DWT
- Length: 632 ft (192.6 m)
- Beam: 90 ft (27.4 m)
- Depth: 48 ft (14.6 m)
- Installed power: Oil-fired steam

SS Puerto Rican, was an American-flagged tanker disabled by an explosion on October 31, 1984. The 20,295 GRT, 632 ft (192.6 m), tanker was owned by Bankers Trust Company and operated by Keystone Shipping Co. of Philadelphia which burned in an explosion with the stern section sinking just hours after leaving San Francisco bound for New Orleans with a cargo of 91,984 barrels (14,624.3 m^{3}) of lubricating oil and additives. In addition to the cargo the ship was fueled with 8,500 barrels (1,350 m^{3}) of heavy fuel oil (Bunker C) before departure.

The ship had departed just after midnight and was in the process of disembarking the pilot at 3:24 a.m. when an explosion occurred near the No. 6 center-independent tank blowing the pilot Captain James S. Nolan and two crew members into the water. The pilot boat San Francisco rescued the pilot and one of the two crew members.

== The incident ==
The ship was eight miles off the Golden Gate bridge on October 31, 1984, at 3:24 a.m., when she was torn by a very large double explosion just forward of her deck house. A 100-foot (30 m) section of deck, the whole width of the vessel, was thrown up and then back down forward on the deck in front of it, as flames shot hundreds of feet in the air.

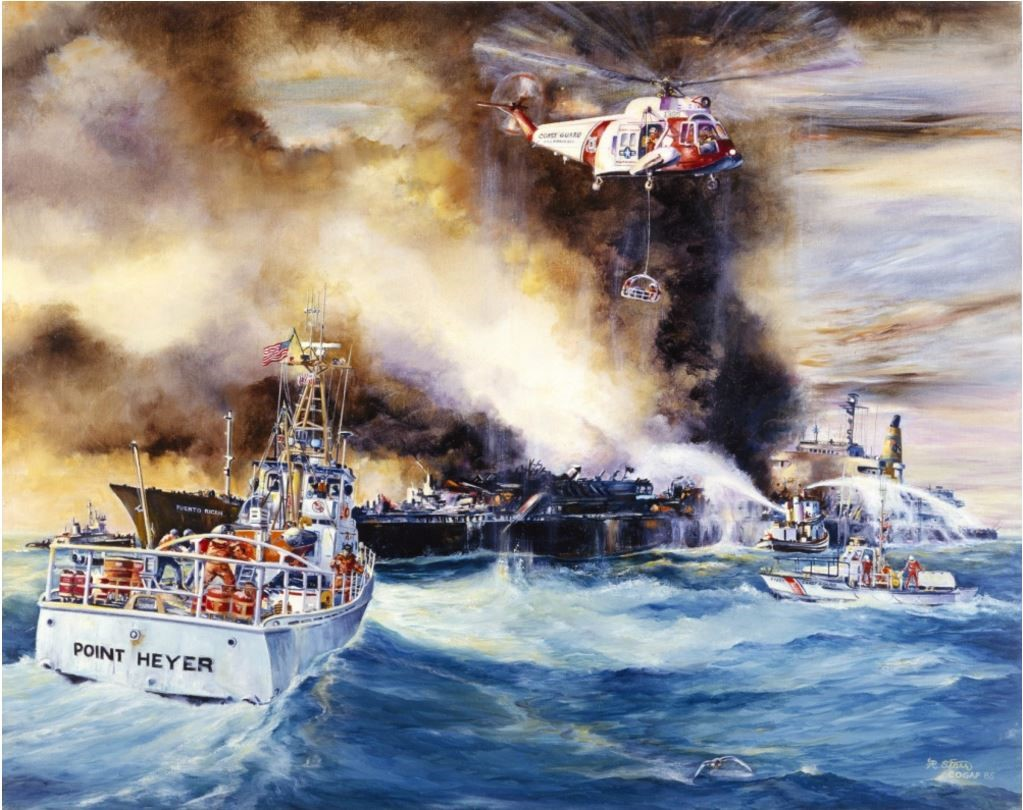
Coast Guard cutter Point Heyer stands by as the stricken tanker SS Puerto Rican burns following a massive explosion, October 31, 1984.

== Loss of life, Coast Guard response, partial sinking ==
A bar pilot, the third mate, and a crew member were thrown into the sea. The pilot boat San Francisco rescued the badly injured pilot and mate, but the crewman was lost. As fire raged on board, the United States Coast Guard towed the crippled ship further out to sea, to keep her from breaking up and dumping her cargo near San Francisco Bay. On November 1, a storm passed through the area, battering Puerto Rican with 35-mile-per-hour (56 km/h) winds and 16-foot (4.9 m)-high seas. That evening, after 32 hours of effort, navy fireboats finally extinguished the fire. On November 3, 30 miles (48 km) southwest of the Golden Gate, she broke up, her stern section sinking to a depth of 1,500 feet (460 m) within the boundaries of the Gulf of the Greater Farallones National Marine Sanctuary. Over a million and a quarter gallons of refined petroleum products, about one-third of Puerto Rican's cargo, went into the water.

== Suspicion of bombing and subsequent investigation ==
In the days after the explosion, there were intimations in the media of sabotage linked to a labor dispute. The vessel had been picketed in a Bay Area port and some of its crew harassed by maritime union pickets. The FBI intervened, but it was quickly determined that no point source explosion had occurred. Later it was found that the explosion probably resulted from holes in tank compartment bulkheads that allowed caustic soda to mix with zinc, forming deadly hydrogen gas that then exploded. A Coast Guard board of investigation attributed this to the negligence of the ship's officers on the inbound voyage from Long Beach. But no cause of the explosion could be established with certainty.

== Oil spill impact ==
The environmental impact was significant. In addition to the initial spill, the sunken stern section continued to discharge heavy bunker oil – as much as 8,000 barrels (1,300 m^{3}) – for months and possibly years afterward. An estimated 4,815 seabirds were killed by oiling as a result of this spill; another 1,368 were recovered.
