= Bass Enterprises Oil Spill =

2005 oil spill in Louisiana

The Bass Enterprises Oil Spill was the largest in a series of oil spills that were caused by damage due to Hurricane Katrina in coastal industrial facilities. About 3.78 million gallons were spilled at the facility in Cox Bay, Louisiana, while an additional 461,000 gallons were spilled at the location in Point a la Hache, also in Louisiana.

== Cox Bay facility ==
Before the spill, the two tanks at the Cox Bay facility were only half-filled in anticipation of the hurricane's landfall. However, they were filled to 45,000 barrels of oil. This, however, was 15,000 barrels greater than the industry recommended and company-imposed standard for a safe level of oil in the storage tanks. This policy had been the successful industry standard for preparation in the event of a similar disaster for about 50 years before. However, despite violating this standard the company faced relatively minimal blowback due to fortunate circumstances surrounding the cleanup.

== Hurricane Katrina ==
On August 29, 2005 Hurricane Katrina made landfall on the U.S. Gulf Coast as a category 3 hurricane. Winds of up to 127 mph and heavy rain brought about significant destruction to facilities in the area. The spill at Bass Enterprises occurred when two storage tanks were hit by the high winds and water of the storm. This Cox Bay location was identified on the Mississippi River navigational charts as being near mile marker 35, a remote region in Southern Louisiana.

== Cleanup and recovery ==
The initial recovery was largely hampered by the devastation caused by the hurricane making it difficult for cleanup crews to get to the site, in some extreme cases in the same region about 3 or more days.

At the Cox Bay facility, cleanup was assisted by oil already contained in earthen berms surrounding the site This is even though one of these reservoirs was filled with water as a result of the hurricane, and was therefore too full to hold more oil from the spill. Even so, this prevented a great deal of the oil from spilling into the Mississippi River, or from directly contaminating the nearby town of St. Palquemines Parish, which contained 20,000 residents who had already sustained significant damage from the hurricane.

Among the many cleanup techniques used at the Cox Bay and Point a la Hache facilities were absorbent pads applied manually by individual workers and drum skimmers that were used in the area immediately surrounding the facility. The cleanup of the area extended well into December 2005, at which point concerns began to grow about the health of the individuals working at the site, not only due to the oil spilled in the immediate area but also due to dangerous conditions in areas where the workers were living. The cleanup was still mostly completed within the end of the year. Cleanup at the site employed 68 responders, 9600 feet of boom, 11 skimmers and 47 response boats.

Overall, of the more than 3.8 million gallons of oil spilled by Bass Enterprises during the aftermath of Hurricane Katrina, nearly 3 million gallons of this oil were recovered. The vast majority of the rest of the oil evaporated into the atmosphere, leading to a relatively successful cleanup, especially compared to other, smaller spills in the region.
