= SS Khark 5 oil spill =

1989 hull breach of an Iranian oil tanker

In late December 1989 and early January 1990, an estimated 70,000 tons of crude oil spilled from the Iranian oil tanker Khark 5 after she suffered a hull breach on 19 December in the mid Atlantic Ocean off of Morocco.

== Background ==
SS Khark 5 (Note: Also spelled Kharg 5 by some publications.) was built by Sasebo Heavy Industries of Sasebo, Japan, and entered service in October 1975 as Chase Venture. She was 339.6 metres (1,114 ft 2 in) long, with a beam of 53.6 metres (175 ft 10 in), and measured 384,632 DWT. She was powered by a single steam turbine engine that gave her a service speed of 15.5 knots (28.7 km/h; 17.8 mph). She sustained damage during the Iran–Iraq War, when she was bombed three times by Iraqi warplanes. In 1986, she was named Khark 5.

== Incident ==
On 19 December 1989, Khark 5 was sailing in heavy weather about 400 miles (640 km) north of the Canary Islands and 112 miles (180 km) west of Morocco when her hull ruptured, triggering an explosion. Two of the ship's fourteen oil tanks were breached, and the 35 crewmembers abandoned ship, later to be rescued by the Soviet Union cargo ship Sarny. Shortly after the explosion, Smit Tak, a Dutch marine salvage company, was engaged to recover Khark 5. The company landed a firefighting team on the tanker, which extinguished fires on board by 21 December but were unable to immediately repair the hull breach, estimated to measure 60 feet (18 m) by 90 feet (27 m). Both Spain and Morocco denied requests to tow the vessel into calmer waters off their coasts, which Smit Tak said prolonged efforts to repair the breach in heavy seas, although repeated efforts in December to take Khark 5 under tow anyway resulted in failure when tow cables snapped. French environmental minister Brice Lalonde later said that the operation had also been delayed during this time while Smit Tak negotiated with the Iranian state-owned oil company over payment for their services.

During the following weeks, the government of Morocco attempted to contain the leaking oil, but their efforts proved largely ineffective, and on 1 January 1990, Morocco made a public request for aid from Britain, France, Spain, and Portugal. When the government made its appeal, the leading edge of the oil slick was about 17 miles (27 km) offshore from the Moroccan coast and was about 230 square miles (600 km^{2}) in area, and Khark 5 was adrift about 45 miles (72 km) from shore. During the first days of January, several hundred responders from Morocco and Europe used chemicals to break apart the slick, laid barriers to stop the spread, and pulled oil from the water. Their efforts, combined with natural dispersion of the slick by waves and evaporation in sunny weather, meant that the majority of the oil had dispersed before reaching shore.

By 3 January, Smit Tak had taken Khark 5 in tow, and had brought her about 110 miles (180 km) off the Moroccan coast, bound southwest towards calmer seas. The company's workers finally sealed the hull breach after an estimated 70,000 tons of oil had spilled from the tanker. After being denied entry to Portuguese waters at the island of Madeira, Smit Tak continued towing Khark 5 towards the Cape Verde Islands.

== Aftermath ==
In early February, the 190,000 tons of oil remaining on Khark 5 was transferred to the Iranian tanker Shirkuh, and Khark 5 was again taken under tow, this time north towards Europe for repairs. She returned to service and was renamed Koohrang in 1991, and operated under that name until she was broken up at Gadani, Pakistan, in September 2001.
