= Bullenbaai =

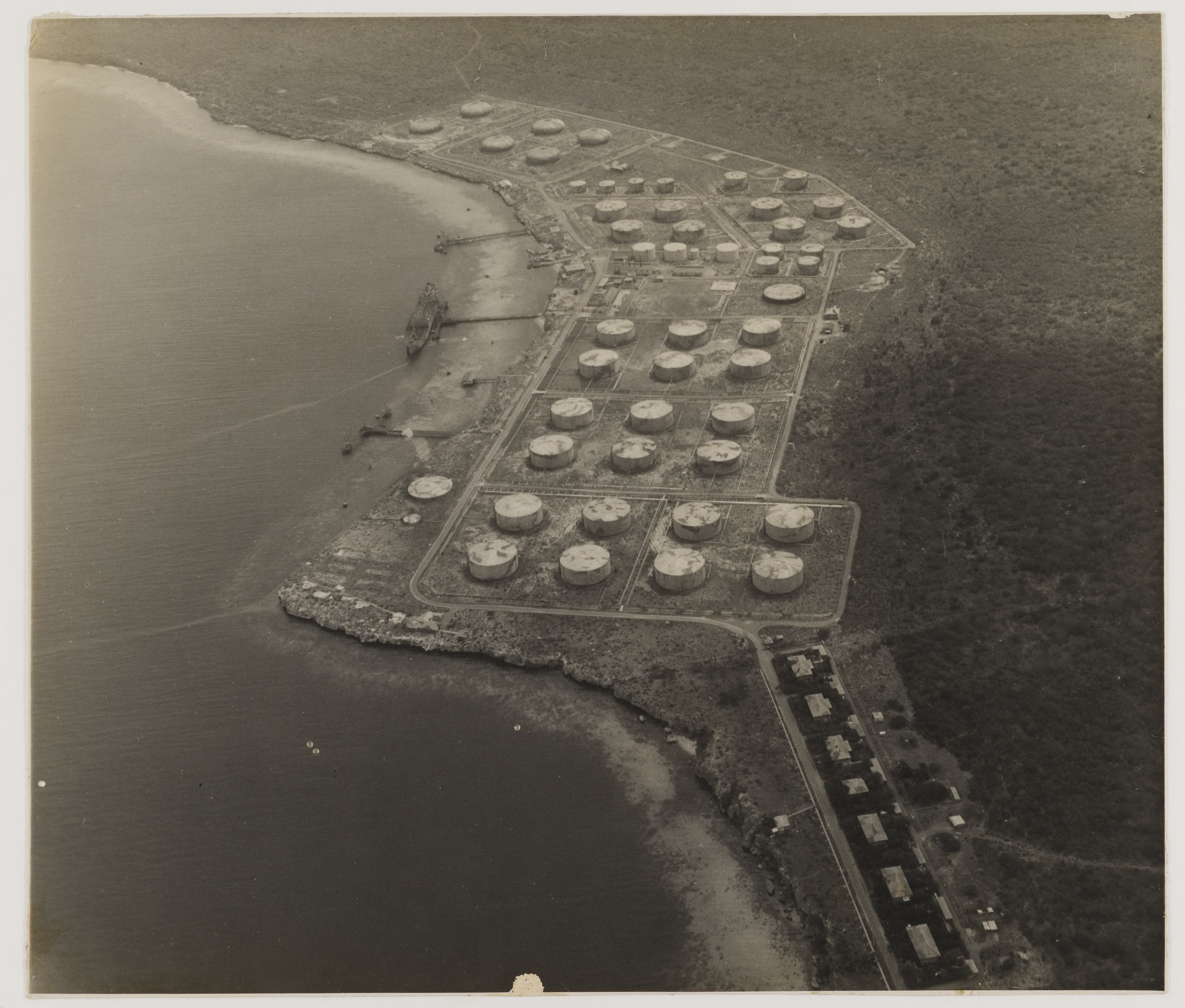
- Curaçao Oil Terminal (circa 1925)

- Location in Curaçao
- Coordinates: 12.182°N 69.032°W
- State: Kingdom of the Netherlands
- Country: Curaçao
- District: Bandabou

Bullenbaai is a bay on the central west coast of Curaçao in the Netherlands Antilles. Covering one sixth of the length of the island's west coast, it extends from the lighthouse at Kaap Sint Marie in the north to the town of Sint Michiel in the south.

Bullenbaai is also home to the Curaçao Oil Terminal. The terminal was built to facilitate economical transshipments of 1,200,00 b/d Eastern Hemisphere crude arriving in "Very Large Crude Carriers" for storage and subsequent carriage by smaller ships to draft restricted U.S. ports. Crude can be transported from the storage tanks through pipelines to the refinery in the Port of Willemstad. The terminal was bought by the Government of Curaçao, and reopened in 2020 after renovation. The terminal employed 535 people in 2020.
