= MV Argo Merchant =

Oil tanker which caused a major oil in 1976

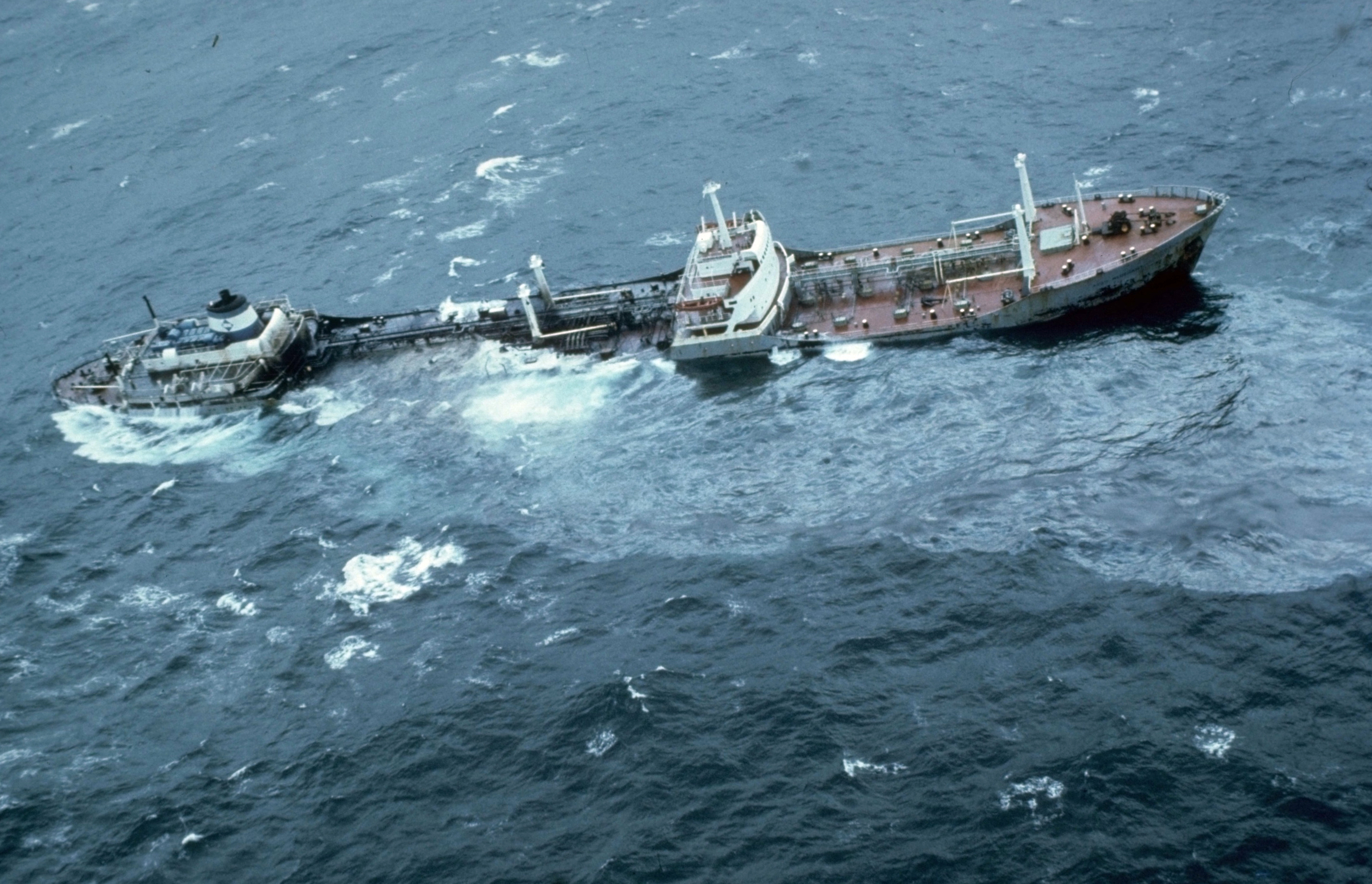
- Argo Merchant, aground southeast of Nantucket seen with a silvery oil slick coming from her center holds.

History
- Name: Arcturus (1953-1968); Permina Samudra III (1968-1970); VARI (1970-1973); Argo Merchant (1973-1976)
- Owner: Thebes Shipping Inc.
- Port of registry: Liberia, Monrovia
- Builder: Howaldtswerke; Hamburg, Germany
- Yard number: 886
- Launched: 5 September 1953
- Maiden voyage: 1953
- In service: 1953
- Out of service: December 15, 1976
- Identification: IMO number: 5022522
- Fate: Foundered/sunk at 41.033°N 69.45°W

General characteristics
- Type: Tanker
- Tonnage: 18,743 GT; 28,691 DWT
- Length: 195.5 m (641 ft)
- Beam: 25.7 m (84 ft)
- Draught: 10.6 m (35 ft)
- Speed: 16 knots

MV Argo Merchant was a Liberian-flagged oil tanker built by Howaldtswerke in Hamburg, Germany in 1953. In 1976, she ran aground and sank southeast of Nantucket Island, Massachusetts, causing one of the largest marine oil spills in history. Throughout the vessel's troubled past, she was involved in more than a dozen major shipping incidents including two other groundings; once in Indonesia while named Permina Samudra III, and again in Sicily while named Vari; as well as a collision in Japan.

== 1976 shipwreck ==
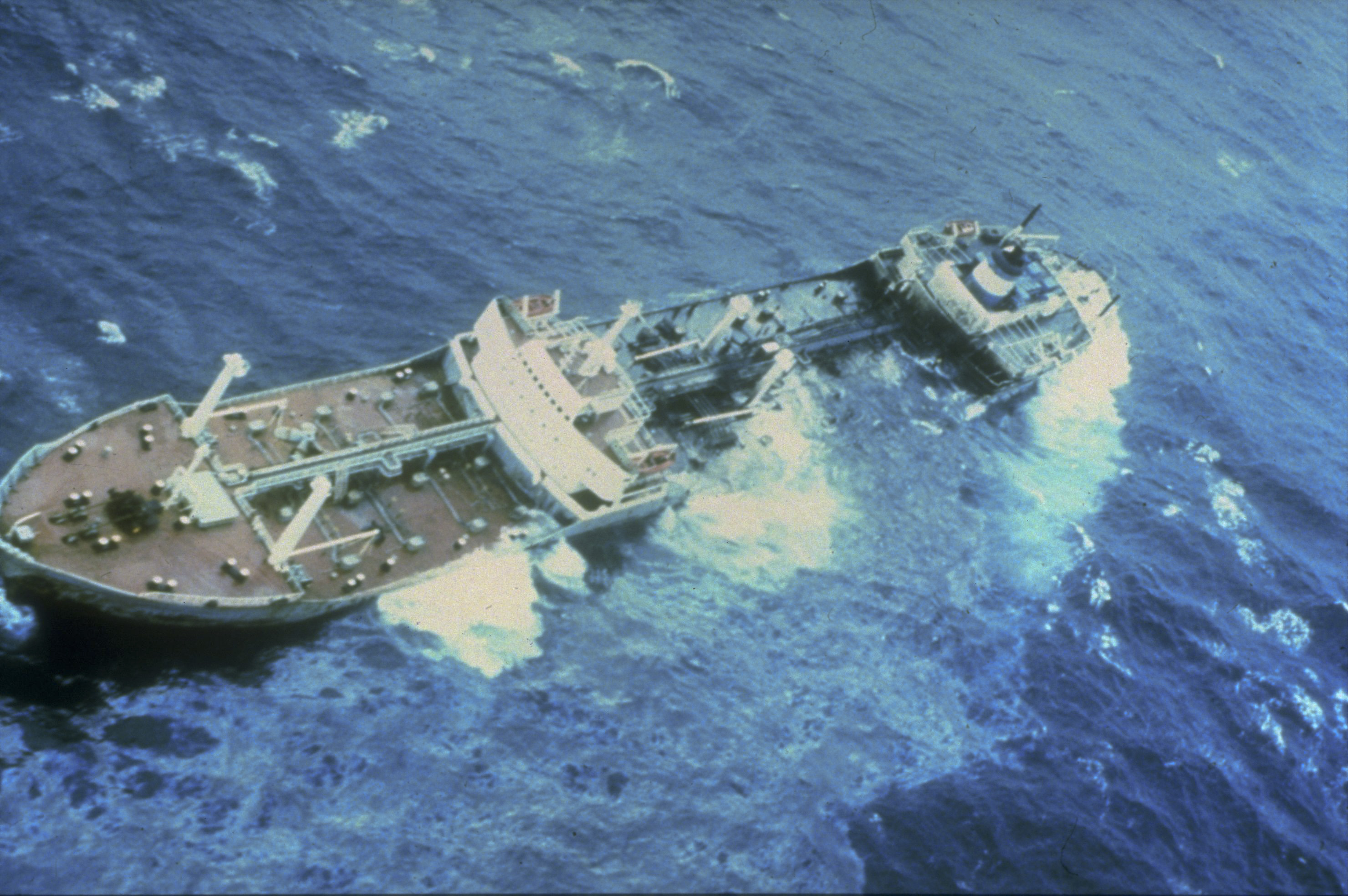
Argo Merchant sinking

In December 1976, Argo Merchant loaded with 7,700,000 US gallons (29,000,000 L) of No. 6 fuel oil at Puerto La Cruz, Venezuela, sailing for Boston under Captain Georgios Papadopoulos. It was later established that the ship carried two unqualified crew as helmsmen, a broken gyrocompass, inadequate charts, and an inaccurate radio direction finder. At 6 p.m. on 15 December in high winds and 3 m (9.8 ft) seas, the tanker ran aground on Middle Rip Shoal about 29 nautical miles (54 km; 33 mi) southeast of Nantucket and more than 24 nmi (44 km; 28 mi) off her intended course. The thirty-eight members of the crew were evacuated, but the shallow waters and weather conditions made it impossible to offload the oil or salvage the ship. On 21 December 1976, Argo Merchant broke apart and emptied its entire cargo of fuel oil, enough to heat 18,000 homes for a year. Northwesterly winds blew the 60 by 100 nmi (110 by 190 km; 69 by 115 mi) oil slick offshore, and coastal fisheries and beaches were spared the worst.

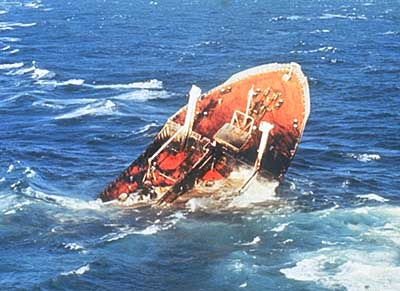
Argo Merchant breaking apart on 21 December 1976.

== See also ==
- List of oil spills
