= 2010 Port Arthur oil spill =

2014 Galveston Bay Oil Spill
- Interactive map of 2014 Galveston Bay Oil Spill
- Location: Galveston Bay at Galveston, Texas
- Coordinates: 29.3041°N 94.7694°W
- Date: March 22, 2014

Cause
- Cause: Collision between M/V Summer Wind and oil tank-barge Kirby
- Operator: Cleopatra Shipping Agency Ltd

Spill characteristics
- Volume: 2,000 to 4,000 barrels (320 to 640 m^{3})

The The Galveston Bay Oil Spill in 2014 was the result of a collision between two vessels in the Galveston Bay area at Galveston, Texas on March 22, 2014. The two vessels were the M/V Summer Wind and the oil tank-barge Kirby colliding with each other causing the thick residual oil to spill into currents.

== Collision ==
The barge collided with the tanker at about 09:30 local time on January 23, 2010, in the Sabine-Neches Waterway as the tanker, chartered by Exxon-Mobil from AET Incorporated to move oil to Exxon's refinery in Beaumont, Texas, moved upstream, and the barge was being maneuvered out of the harbor. The collision tore a 15 × 8-foot (2.4 m) hole in the side of the tanker, through 450,000 US gallons (1,700,000 L), or 1,500 tonnes, of crude oil, escaped. According to statements from the tanker's crew, the tank that was damaged contained 80,000 barrels (13,000 m^{3}) of oil, of which 69,000 had been transferred to another tank, leaving 11,000 barrels (1,700 m^{3}), or 450,000 US gallons (1,700,000 L) unaccounted for. According to local officials, however, there did not appear to be that much oil in the water, and some said that as little as a thousand barrels, or 42,000 US gallons (160,000 L), of oil had spilled. Coast Guard officials acknowledged that this might be the case, and that oil could have remained in the damaged tank. Referring to the size of the spill, a Coast Guard officer said, "This is a big one." In response to the spill, emergency crews evacuated about 28 blocks of buildings around the site of the collision, but by the evening of the 23rd, residents had been allowed to return.

== Aftermath ==
A perimeter was established around the affected area, and none of the oil had harmed local wildlife. The collision occurred in a still part of the channel, which helped to limit the flow of oil both upstream or downstream. AET activated their OPA 90 response plan and called upon Resolve Marine to lighter and refloat the damaged vessel while contractors worked to contain the oil spilled. While the section of the waterway the collision occurred in is largely industrial, there are marshes along shorelines in other parts that are susceptible to damage from oil spills. The collision closed the Port Arthur waterway, and Coast Guard personnel could not immediately comment on how long it would take to clean the spill or reopen the channel. The only statement made regarding the time it would take to reopen the waterway was that "We're working as quickly as possible to clean up the spill," according to a Coast Guard officer. By the day after the incident, about 1,100 barrels (170 m^{3}) of spilled oil had been recovered, and most of the unrecovered oil was contained. However, according to both the Coast Guard and local officials, the possibility of currents in the channel picking up remained, and with it the potential for oil to flow downstream into marshes. Four oil refineries operate in the Port Arthur area, with a total capacity of about 1.1 million barrels (170,000 m^{3}) of oil a day. In statements, neither Exxon or Valero, which operate two of the refineries, said they expected operations to be disrupted by the collision. Neither Motiva Enterprises or Total, which operate the other two refineries, initially publicly responded to the spill. In its response to the incident, the tanker's operator, AET Inc. said it was cooperating with investigators, and was prepared to bear the costs of cleanup, but noted that responsibility for the incident had not been determined. The company also refused to name the pilots in charge of the ship at the time of the collision. On January 27, the tanker was removed from the waterway, and soon after, limited traffic through the channel was allowed to resume. In a statement on January 29, the Coast Guard said they hoped to allow full operations in the waterway to resume within a week.

== Effect on industry ==
The collision entirely closed the waterway for four days, with limited ship traffic allowed to resume January 27, with operations planned to return to normal by February 5. A total of 26 oil tankers were affected by the collision, with eight vessels waiting at the mouth of the channel by the time it was partially reopened. An officer from the Coast Guard said that their intent was to allow the largest tankers through the channel first. In response to the incident, the oil refinery operated by Motiva Enterprises reduced production by 110,000 barrels (17,000 m^{3}) per day, although whether other refineries reduced production was not clear, as further statements were not released from the operators of the refineries.

== See also ==
- Port of Port Arthur
- List of oil spills
