= SS Grand Zenith =

Oil tanker lost in 1976 or 1977

SS Grand Zenith was an oil tanker that sank sometime after December 30, 1976 with the loss of all hands.

Grand Zenith was 642 feet (196 m) long and was constructed in 1953 by the Bethlehem Shipbuilding Corporation. She measured 18,736 GRT, and was powered by a single steam turbine that gave her a speed of 17 knots (20 mph). She was launched as Orion Cometon 28 July 1953 and renamed Flying Comet in 1964, quickly followed by Western Comet the same year, then to Beta Reserve in 1973 before receiving the name Grand Zenith in 1974. At the time of her loss, she was registered in Panama and was owned by Zenith Navigation Corporation.

On December 19, 1976, Grand Zenith departed Teesport, England with 8,000,000 US gallons (30,000,000 L) of fuel oil on board and 38 crewmembers. She was last heard from on December 30, when her captain sent a cable to her American agent, the J. F. Moran Company, saying that she had run into "heavy weather" about 36 miles (58 km) southeast of Cape Sable that had led her to reduce speed. After she missed her scheduled January 2 arrival in Somerset, Massachusetts, she was reported missing, and a search was begun on January 3 by the United States Coast Guard, which deployed a cutter and helicopter, and the Canadian Coast Guard, which sent a plane.

On January 4, aircraft from the United States Navy and Air Force Reserve joined the search, which covered about 34,000 square miles (88,000 km^{2}). The search area was expanded the following day to 100,000 square miles (260,000 km^{2}). On January 7, searchers found two life jackets from the ship, along with some debris and an oil slick about 140 miles (230 km) southeast of Cape Sable, leading the Coast Guard to confirm that Grand Zenith had sunk, most likely on December 30 or 31. On January 11, with heavy weather and no further signs of the ship or survivors, the Coast Guard abandoned the search and declared the entire crew lost.
