= Jebel al-Zayt oil spill =

2010 Egyptian oil spill in the Red Sea

- Location: Egypt, Red Sea
- Date: June 16 – 23, 2010

Cause
- Operator: Geisum Oil

Spill characteristics
- Area: 100 to 500 mi^{2} (260 to 1,290 km^{2})

The Jebel al Zayt oil spill occurred north of the Red Sea on June 16, 2010. It is considered to be the largest offshore spill in Egyptian history. The spill polluted around 100 miles (160 km) of coastline including tourist beach resorts. Oil company officials in the port city of Suez said the spill was caused by a leak from an offshore oil platform in Jebel al-Zayt north of Hurghada owned by the Egyptian government's state-owned oil company, Geisum Oil.

== Environmental impacts ==
The oil spill occurred in Egypt, north of the Red Sea. It polluted several tourist areas along the coastline of the Red Sea. The spill damaged areas that are home to popular diving sites with extensive underwater coral reefs. A number of beaches and resorts along the coast were affected greatly. Marine life in the Hurghada area was at risk of heavy damage but it was later discovered that there was very little damage to the marine life. Scientists believe that the environmental damage was limited due to strong currents and winds that pushed the oil quickly away from the underwater coral reefs, and towards the shoreline of Hurghada. The affected areas have rich biodiversity that has a fragile ecosystem. Although it was unaffected environmentalists are still worried about disasters in the future and the potential danger it could inflict to the marine life.

== Clean-up ==
An extensive cleaning initiative was implemented for the areas affected and damaged by the oil companies. Within 5 days of the spillover 90% of the impacted beaches and mainland had been cleaned. Although damage to wildlife was still evident with turtles and sea birds covered in oil. Small oil spills are frequent in the area due to a number of offshore drilling sites. There are over 180 oil rigs operating in the Red Sea and the Gulf of Suez which accounts for a large percentage of the economy.

== Government cover up accusations ==
The Egyptian government has been accused of trying to cover up this disaster. Environmentalists in the area believe the government wanted to release as little information as possible in order to keep resorts in the area open for business. They also wanted tourists who had arrived for diving to continue visiting the area. These popular sites account for a large percentage of the tourism industry in Egypt. The tourism industry is one of the most important sectors in Egypt’s economy. The initial leak was first reported on June 18, 2010 but many believe it began days before. Although damage has been reported to be minimal an environmental group in the area reported the leak had restarted once the statement was released, damaging the surrounding areas even further. The Hurghada Environmental Protection and Conservation Association (HEPA) reported that hundreds of birds, turtles, and other wild life had been killed, but the government reported almost no deaths of wild life. The amount of oil that had leaked is still unknown, this has critics asking the government further questions as to why they have released such little information. Also the government is unable to determine the source of the spill or how it began.

Few media outlets reported on this oil spill due to the BP oil spill which overshadowed this issue. The BP oil spill which was one of the largest accidental oil spills in history. It happened weeks before the Egypt oil spill had occurred.

== See also ==
- List of oil spills
