= Cabo Manglares =

Cape in Colombia

Coordinates: 1°39′2″N 79°0′29″W

Cabo Manglares is located at the westernmost end of the Colombian mainland, located in the Nariño Department and on the waters of the Mira River.

The cape is located in the municipality of Tumaco, about 45 kilometers southwest of the municipal head and about 36.6 kilometers from the Ancón de Sardinas.
