= Xingang Port oil spill =

Disaster in China in 2010

- Interactive map of Xingang Port oil spill
- Location: Yellow Sea, Xingang Harbour; Dalian, Liaoning Province, China
- Coordinates: 38.92°N 121.63°E
- Date: 16–26 July 2010

Cause
- Cause: Ruptured pipeline
- Operator: China National Petroleum Corporation

Spill characteristics
- Volume: 1,500 to 105,000 m^{3} (400,000 to 27,740,000 US gal)
- Area: >946 km^{2} (365 sq mi)

The Xingang Port oil spill is a spill that occurred in July 2010 caused by a rupture and subsequent explosion of two crude oil pipelines that run to an oil storage depot of the China National Petroleum Corporation in Xingang Harbour, Dalian, Liaoning Province, China. The 1,500 tonnes of oil spilled from the pipes created a 180 km^{2} (69 sq mi) slick in the Yellow Sea that grew to 430 km^{2} (170 sq mi) within a week. By July 21, the spill had spread to 946 km^{2} (365 sq mi), and stretched as far as 90 km (56 mi) along the coast.

== Incident ==
Location in Liaoning

The spill occurred after a process to desulfurize oil in a pipeline at the port began, triggering a fire which subsequently burned for 15 hours. The fire burned from oil that was released from a filled storage tank with a 90,000 ton capacity that collapsed as a result of the fire. Oil from other nearby tanks was, according to a Greenpeace report released several weeks after the incident, intentionally released to prevent the fire from expanding towards a tank containing dimethylbenzene, a flammable chemical.

== Containment and cover-up allegations ==
Although Chinese government officials reported that as little as 1,500 tonnes of oil spilled, a former University of Alaska marine conservation specialist, Rick Steiner, estimates the spill to have a much higher total, with somewhere in the range of 60,000 to 90,000 tons (18.47 to 27.70 million gallons) of oil spilled into the Yellow Sea. He said that "[i]t's enormous. That's at least as large as the official estimate of the Exxon Valdez disaster." However, a government spokesperson for Dalian refuted this estimate, and referred to a panel of experts assessing the spill's size and environmental effect saying that "[w]e will know w[h]ether it's smaller or bigger than 60,000 tons based on the conclusion made by the panel".

The ensuing fire burned for 15 hours. There was extensive damage to local wildlife areas, aquaculture, and beaches were closed following the spill and conflagration which appeared to have been caused by the injection of a highly oxidizing sulfur reducing agent into a pipeline.

On July 20, 2010, China Fire Services Dalian Fire Department Logistics Battalion firefighter Sergeant Zhang Liang was swept overboard while assisting with cleanup efforts after the oil spill. He was posthumously awarded Martyr status.

On 26 July 2010, the Chinese local government announced the spill had been contained and that the spill had failed to reach open waters. Cleanup efforts continued two weeks after the original explosion began, with operations to remove the oil performed at night when the oil is most viscous.

The cleanup effort largely used low-tech methods, including containment booms and straw mats to absorb the oil, as well as a fleet of fishermen manually scooping oil out of the water and transferring it to barrels for storage and eventual disposal. Additionally, limited amounts of chemical dispersants were used, as well as a material to increase biodegradation of oil.

== Reaction ==
After the incident the Chinese government announced that safety standards would be tightened up at ports.

== Impact ==
The oil spill affected several aspects of the area's economy. Tourism was affected after oil began washing ashore on beaches, some of which were closed after the spill; according to Greenpeace, additional oil washing ashore was a possibility that remained for the rest of the summer. The oil severely affected fishing industry near Dalian, especially offshore shellfish farms, many of which were contaminated by the oil, either killing the fish or rendering them unfit for consumption. The economic loss was estimated to be as high as tens of millions of US dollars. Environmental damage was also serious as a result of the spill; the majority of wildlife inhabiting the area was exposed to oil, which led to the deaths of some, while others were expected to display longer-term effects.

Lu Guang's pictures of the oil spill and the subsequent funeral of firefighter Zhang Liang were awarded a third prize in the category "Spot News" in the 2011 World Press Photo contest.

== Aftermath ==
The non-fiction book Tears are The Deepest Waters (最深的水是泪水) authored by Bao'erji Yuanye was based on the incident, and then adapted as the film The Bravest in 2019.

== See also ==
- List of oil spills
