= 2010 ExxonMobil oil spill =

Oil spill in Akwa Ibom, Nigeria

On 1 May 2010, a ruptured ExxonMobil pipeline in the state of Akwa Ibom, Nigeria, spilled more than a million gallons into the delta and contributed to the major environmental issues in the Niger Delta. The spill had occurred at an Exxon platform some 20–25 miles (32–40 km) offshore which feeds the Qua Iboe oil export terminal. Exxon Mobil declared force majeure on Qua Iboe oil shipments due to the pipeline damage. The leakage in the Qua Iboe oil field discharged about 232 barrels of crude into the Atlantic Ocean contaminating the waters and coastal settlements in the predominantly fishing communities along Akwa Ibom and Cross River.

== Effects ==
Many locals in the region attest to environmental damage that allegedly developed as a result of the leak. Past oil spills in the delta's creeks have been left to fester for decades, polluting the air, soil, and water of impoverished communities. Nigeria sees its future output growth largely in offshore fields and does not want spills there to compound its environmental woes. Checks by Sahara Reporters revealed that the fishermen reportedly hauled in fish killed in ExxonMobil's oil spill in a location about 20 kilometers from the shoreline and supplied the bad fish to unsuspecting members of the public. The Nigerian Environmental Rights Action group issued a demand for N51 billion ($100 Million) from ExxonMobil in Nigeria for their failure to compensate fishermen within the coastal areas who suffered devastating losses due to the oil company's exploration activities and major oil spills. Thick balls of tar have also been sighted washed upon the shoreline as well as oil slicks. The spill has only exacerbated the already growing problem of pollution in the Delta. The Nigerian government estimates there were over 7,000 spills, large and small, between 1970 and 2000, according to the BBC. That is approximately 300 spills a year, and some spills have been leaking for years. Vast swathes of the Delta have been seen covered with tar and stagnant lakes of crude due to oil spills of the past.

== Cleanup effort ==
ExxonMobil of Nigeria was cited for the reported use of dispersants near the coast to contain the oil spill. These dispersants were considered a violation of environmental standards in the oil industry. Rev. Samuel Ayadi, Akwa Ibom State Chapter Chairman of Artisan Fishermen Association of Nigeria (ARFAN), said that ExxonMobil was in the habit of using dangerous chemical dispersants which are scientifically proven to be toxic to human and aquatic life to clean up oil spills whenever they occur. He also noted that dispersants were even more dangerous than crude oil because it breaks down the crude oil and sinks it to the sea bed where it kills fish eggs and fingerlings thereby wiping out generations of fish stock and other sea food and marine creatures that make up the food chain.

== Controversy ==
Following the 1 May spill, protests by women and youth in the local areas disrupted oil production at Mobil facilities for two days, with reports of soldiers beating protestors, including one woman who suffered a broken leg. Those protests led to a May 20 meeting with stakeholders from the Akwa Ibom State Government, Mobil, and core host communities. Among the topics raised was “the issue of the oil company playing one community against another.”

== See also ==
- Environmental issues in the Niger Delta
