= 2010 Mumbai oil spill =

Mumbai oil spill
- Interactive map of Mumbai oil spill
- Location: Mumbai Harbour, Karanja Reefs, Arabian Sea
- Coordinates: 18.9051°N 72.8760°E
- Date: 7 August 2010

Cause
- Cause: Ship collision involving MSC Chitra and Khalijia III
- Casualties: None

Spill characteristics
- Volume: 2,900 barrels (460 m^{3}) (400 tonnes) – 5,900 barrels (940 m^{3}) (800 tonnes)

The 2010 Mumbai oil spill occurred after the Panama-flagged Mediterranean Shipping Company's MSC Chitra; (IMO: 7814838) and Khalijia III (IMO: 8128690) collided off the coast of India near Mumbai on Saturday, 7 August 2010 at around 9:50 am local time. MSC Chitra, which was outbound from South Mumbai's Nava Sheva port, collided with the inbound Khalijia III, which caused about 200 cargo containers from MSC Chitra to be thrown into the Arabian Sea. Khalijia III was apparently involved with another mishap on 18 July 2010.

== See also ==
- List of oil spills
