= 2009 in the environment =

This is a list of notable events relating to the environment in 2009. They relate to environmental law, conservation, environmentalism and environmental issues.

== Events ==
- The United Nations General Assembly declared 2009 as the International Year of Natural Fibres. Promoting sustainability was one of its aims.
- The town of Picher, Oklahoma in the United States is depopulated due to environment and health problems from mining operations.
- A number of protected areas were established in 2009, including Altos de Pemehue National Reserve, in Chile, and Beaver Dam Wash National Conservation Area in Utah,

=== February ===
- The 2009 USS Port Royal grounding of the United States Navy guided missile cruiser Port Royal occurred off Oahu, Hawaii. In the incident, the ship ran aground on a coral reef, damaging and necessitating repairs to both the ship and the reef. The incident received wide press coverage in Hawaii, at least in part because of the damage caused to a sensitive coral environment.
- The West Cork oil spill was an oil spill off the southern coast of Ireland.

=== March ===
- The 2009 southeast Queensland oil spill occurred off the coast of south-east Queensland, Australia, in which 230 tonnes of fuel oil, 30 tonnes of other fuel and 31 shipping containers (620 tonnes) of ammonium nitrate spilled into the Coral Sea, north of Moreton Bay during Cyclone Hamish after unsecured cargo on the container ship, MV Pacific Adventurer damaged other cargo, causing the spillage. Over the following days, the spill washed ashore along 60 kilometres (37 mi) of coastline encompassing the Sunshine Coast, Moreton Bay, Bribie Island and Moreton Island.

=== April ===
- The 2009 Lüderitz oil spill off the coast of Lüderitz, Namibia affected 156 African penguins, with many more possibly threatened.
- The 2009 G-20 London summit protests were in part motivated by concerns about climate change.

=== May ===
- The third C40 Large Cities Climate Leadership Group meets in Seoul.

=== June ===
- The International Whaling Commission's meeting was held on the island of Madeira in Portugal.
- The memorandum on a Common External Power Supply is signed to reduce the environmental impact of mobile phone chargers. It was sponsored by the European Union.
- In the Coeur Alaska, Inc. v. Southeast Alaska Conservation Council case it was decided the Coeur Alaska could dump gold mine tailings in a dump.
- Hawadax Island in Alaska is declared rat free, 229 years after being introduced onto the island by a Japanese shipwreck.

=== July ===
- The Full City oil spill occurred when the Panama-registered, bulk carrier Full City operated by COSCO (H.K.) Shipping Co. Ltd. ran aground near Såstein south of Langesund, Telemark, Norway spilling 200,000 kg of IFO-380 heavy fuel oil.

=== August ===
- The Montara oil spill was an oil and gas leak and subsequent slick that took place in the Montara oil field in the Timor Sea, off the northern coast of Western Australia. It is considered one of Australia's worst oil disasters.
- A moratorium on commercial fishing of the Beaufort Sea was announced by the United States Secretary of Commerce Gary Locke.

=== November ===
- The Climatic Research Unit email controversy (also known as "Climategate") began with the hacking of a server at the Climatic Research Unit at the University of East Anglia. Several weeks before the Copenhagen Summit on climate change, an unknown individual or group had breached CRU's server and thousands of emails and computer files were copied to various locations on the Internet.

=== December ===
- The 2009 United Nations Climate Change Conference, commonly known as the Copenhagen Summit, was held at the Bella Center in Copenhagen, Denmark, between 7 December and 18 December. The conference included the 15th Conference of the Parties (COP 15) to the United Nations Framework Convention on Climate Change and the 5th Meeting of the Parties (MOP 5) to the Kyoto Protocol. According to the Bali Road Map, a framework for climate change mitigation beyond 2012 was to be agreed there.
- The Copenhagen Accord is a document that delegates at the 15th session of the Conference of Parties (COP 15) to the United Nations Framework Convention on Climate Change agreed to "take note of" at the final plenary on 18 December 2009. The Accord, drafted by, on the one hand, the United States and on the other, in a united position as the BASIC countries (China, India, South Africa, and Brazil), is not legally binding and does not commit countries to agree to a binding successor to the Kyoto Protocol, whose present round ends in 2012.

== See also ==
- Human impact on the environment
- List of environmental issues
- List of years in the environment
