= San Francisco Bay Oil Spill =

San Francisco Bay Oil Spill may refer to:

- The 1971 San Francisco Bay oil spill, resulting from a collision of two Standard Oil tankers
- The 2007 Cosco Busan oil spill
