= Bay Bridge oil spill =

Bay Bridge oil spill may refer to:

- The 1971 San Francisco Bay oil spill, resulting from a collision of two Standard Oil tankers
- The 2007 Cosco Busan oil spill
