= MT Stolt Valor =

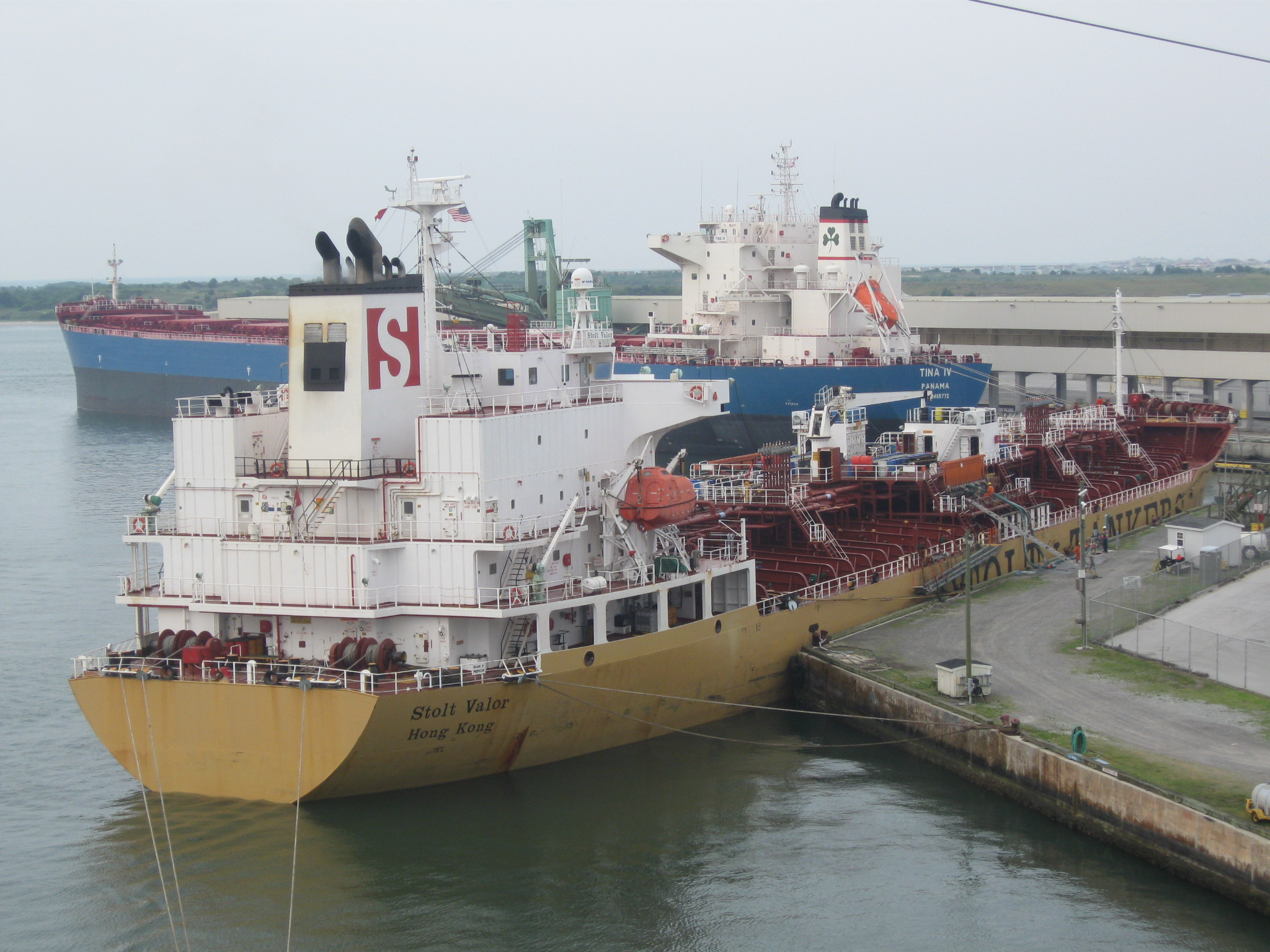

History

Hong Kong
- Name: MT Stolt Valor
- Owner: Owner: Panama-registered company, Ocean Carrier Transit; Beneficial owner: Central Marine of Hiroshima, Japan
- Operator: Fleet Management Ltd. of Hong Kong
- Launched: 10 November 2003
- Completed: 2003
- Out of service: 15 March 2012
- Identification: IMO number: 9274290
- Fate: Scrapped October 2012

General characteristics
- Type: Chemical tanker
- Tonnage: 25,269 DWT
- Crew: 22
- Notes: Classed: by ClassNK; Insured: through Assuranceforeningen Gard

"It was not only an ordeal but also a nightmare for all of us on board the Stolt Valor." (Captain Prabhat Kumar Goyal, November 16, 2008)

—

The MT Stolt Valor was a Hong Kong-flagged ship that was hijacked while in the Designated Safety Corridor within the Gulf of Aden, approximately 38 nautical miles (70 km) away from the coast of Yemen, while heading from the United States south through the Gulf towards Asia. After the ship passed through the Suez Canal, it encountered hijackers and alerted the International Maritime Bureau. Area coalition forces arrived too late to avert the hijacking which occurred at 10:16 UTC on September 15, 2008 by Somali pirates.

The Japanese-owned chemical tanker, managed by Fleet Management Ltd. of Hong Kong, and on time charter to Stolt Tankers, carried a crew of 22 members, including eighteen from India, two from the Philippines, one from Bangladesh, and one from Russia according to Fleet's spokesman, Ferdi Stolzenberg. The ship's captain was Prabhat Kumar Goyal of Teg Bahadur Road, Dehradun. The ship was carrying 19,800 metric tons of phosphoric acid, loaded in Morehead City, North Carolina, at time of capture.

Following capture, the Stolt Valor made way to the pirate haven of Eyl on the eastern coast of Somalia. The pirates made contact with the ship's owners the following day, September 16. The ship's Master, through email and phone, stated that his crew was unharmed and confined to the ship's wheelhouse.

== Ransom ==
An initial demand of ransom for US$6 million was later decreased to US$2.5 million. The ransom negotiations were conducted by National Union of Seafarers of India (NUSI) General Secretary Abdul Gani in Hong Kong, saying "Definitely ransom has been paid but we will not be able to go into details."

== Release ==
The Stolt Valor was released the morning of November 16, 2008.

== 2012 fire ==
On March 15, 2012, an explosion and subsequent fire occurred on board Stolt Valor while she was 27 nautical miles (50 km) off Jubail, Saudi Arabia. The ship was carrying a cargo of methyl tertiary butyl ether and isobutanol. One crew member was killed. Twenty-four survivors were rescued by USS John Paul Jones and later transferred to USCGC Baranof.

== Scrap ==
The fire was eventually extinguished and all pollutants - both chemical cargo and fuel - later removed, but the ship was forced to drift in the Gulf for several months before authorities in Bahrain offered it a port of refuge. Stolt Valor was deemed too badly damaged for repairs to be economically viable and the ship owners and managers STOLT, decided to scrap it. She was scrapped in mid-October 2012 in Bahrain.

== See also ==
- Piracy in Somalia
