= The O'Brien's Group =

O'Brien's Response Management
- Trade name: O'Brien's
- Formerly: O'Brien's Oil Pollution Service (OOPS Inc.), The O'Brien's Group
- Type: Private
- Industry: Oil spill response
- Incorporated: Louisiana
- Founded: 1983
- Founder: Jim O'Brien
- Key people: Jim O'Brien (Founder)
- Services: Oil spill cleanup, remediation, management
- Owner: Seacor Holdings Inc. (1997–present)
- Number of employees: 1,500 (for Cosco Busan spill) (2007 (for Cosco Busan spill))
- Parent: Seacor Holdings Inc.

O'Brien's Response Management is the largest oil spill management company in the United States

== Background ==
Company founder Jim O'Brien fought his first oil spill in 1969 as an officer with the United States Coast Guard. In 1983 he retired to form his own company, O'Brien's Oil Pollution Service, known as "OOPS Inc.", in Slidell, Louisiana. O'Brien soon gained fame in the 1980s as the "Red Adair of oil spill cleanup". O'Brien also helped manage the Exxon Valdez oil spill of 1989. Following that event, the United States enacted the Oil Pollution Act of 1990, requiring ships to carry sufficient insurance and hire a management company to handle any oil spill.

The company was bought by Seacor Holdings Inc. in 1997 and later renamed the O'Brien's Group, with O'Brien remaining as President. In 2004, the company helped clean 265,000 gallons of oil that spilled into the Delaware River from the Athos I. It oversaw recovery for the Murphy Oil Spill in Chalmette, Louisiana following Hurricane Katrina. In July 2007, the company oversaw remediation efforts when refineries near Coffeyville, Kansas spilled 71,400 gallons of oil into the Verdigris River during a flood. The company was also responsible for managing clean-up efforts after the Cosco Busan spilled 58,000 gallons of bunker oil into the San Francisco Bay on November 7, 2007. It deployed approximately 1,500 workers to clean up that spill.

As of 2007, O'Brien's Response Management represents approximately 400 shipping companies, 5,000 ships, and 200 oil and gas companies and has worked on over 400 spills in the past three years.
