= Dragonfly Creek =

Stream in San Francisco, California, U.S.

Dragonfly Creek is a stream in the Presidio of San Francisco, California. Predominantly buried in underground culverts, the creek flows through a valley beneath stables and empties into Crissy Marsh in the bay. As part of the Doyle Drive construction project, the stream will be extensively restored. The creek is home to diverse types of wildlife. Over 20 different types of birds, salamanders, and many insects reside at the creek.
