= Cosco Busan oil spill =

2007 oil spill in the San Francisco Bay

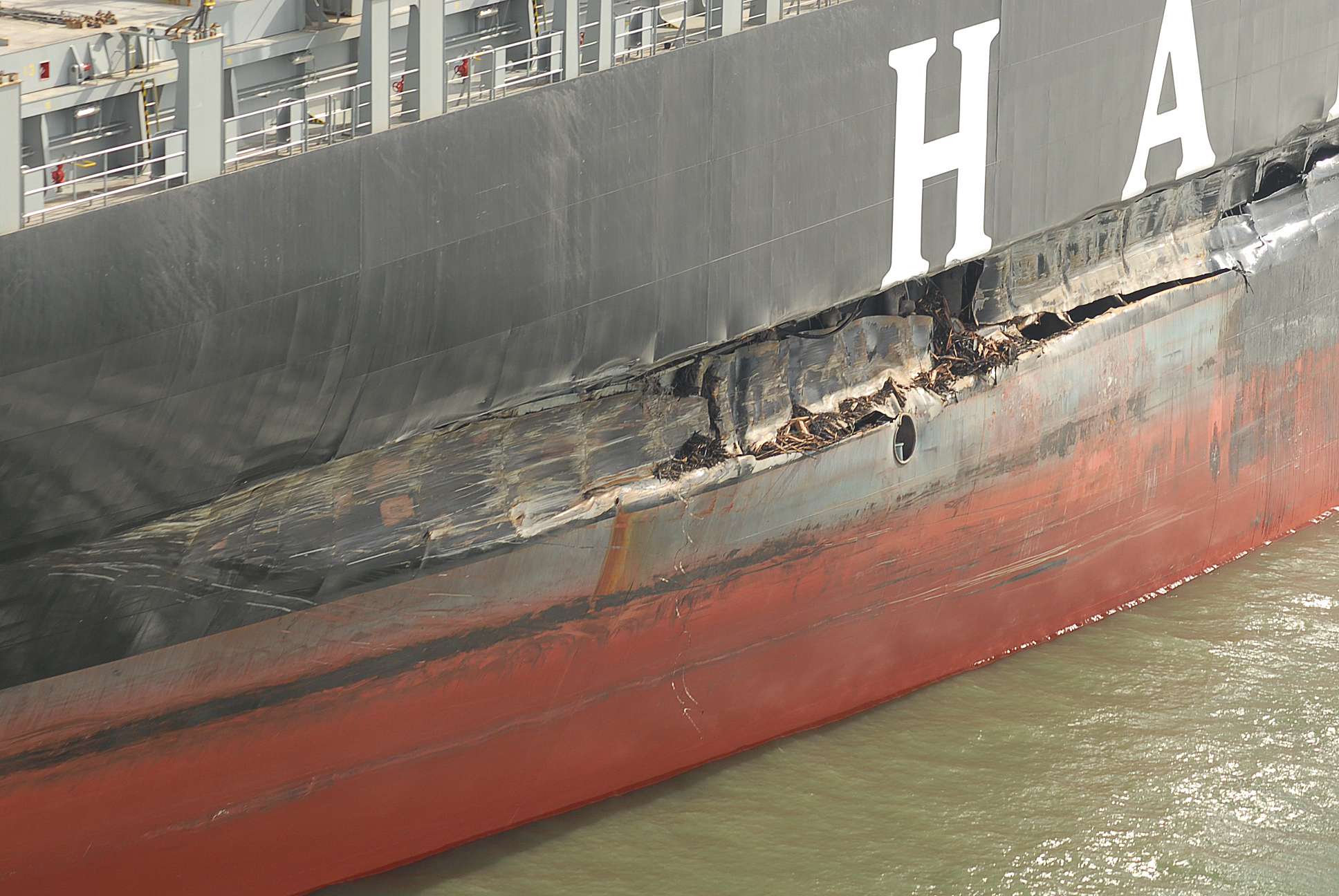
- The damaged MV Cosco Busan after alliding with the bridge tower fender
- Interactive map of Cosco Busan oil spill
- Location: San Francisco Bay
- Coordinates: 37.80073°N 122.37486°W
- Date: 7 November 2007

Cause
- Cause: Cosco Busan allision with the San Francisco–Oakland Bay Bridge in thick fog.
- Operator: Fleet Management Limited

Spill characteristics
- Volume: 53,569 US gal (202,780 L; 44,606 imp gal)
- Area: 150 mi^{2} (390 km^{2})
- Shoreline impacted: 26 mi (42 km)

The Cosco Busan oil spill occurred at 08:30 UTC-8 on 7 November 2007 between San Francisco and Oakland, California, in which 53,569 US gal (202,780 L) of IFO-380 heavy fuel oil, sometimes referred to as "bunker fuel", spilled into San Francisco Bay after the container ship Cosco Busan, operated by Fleet Management Limited struck Delta Tower of the San Francisco–Oakland Bay Bridge in thick fog.

Investigators found that maritime pilot John Cota was impaired because of his use of prescription pharmaceuticals while piloting the container vessel, which rendered him unable to use the onboard radar and electronic navigation charts correctly. This occurred despite the fact that the Vessel Traffic Service of the United States Coast Guard warned Cota that the vessel was headed for the bridge. Cota was sentenced to 10 months in federal prison for his role in the incident.

California Governor Arnold Schwarzenegger declared a state of emergency after meeting federal, state and local officials overseeing the cleanup. The proclamation made additional state personnel, funding and equipment available to assess and clean up the environmental damage.

== Causes ==
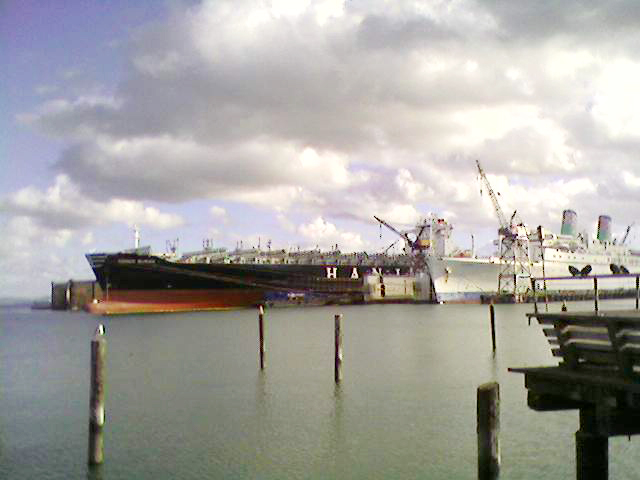
Cosco Busan laid up at Pier 70 for repairs. Next to it is the SS Oceanic.

The National Transportation Safety Board determined the following probable causes of the accident:

1. the pilot's degraded cognitive performance from his use of impairing prescription medications
2. the absence of a comprehensive pre-departure master/pilot exchange and a lack of effective communication between Pilot John Cota and Master, Captain Mao Cai Sun during the accident voyage, and
3. Captain Sun's ineffective oversight of Cota's piloting performance and the vessel's progress.

Other contributing factors included:

1. the failure of Fleet Management Ltd. to train Cosco Busan crewmembers, including a failure to ensure that the crew understood and complied with the company's safety management system;
2. the U.S. Coast Guard's failure to provide adequate medical oversight of Cota, in view of the medical and medication information he had reported to the Coast Guard.

Master Mao Cai Sun meekly abdicated control of his ship to a pilot who was affected by pharmaceuticals. First Mate Kongxiang Hu left his post as lookout to eat breakfast. Second Mate Shun Biao Zhao failed to plan the ship's course out of the bay and then forged his colleagues' signatures on a plan drafted after the accident. And Third Mate Hong Zhi Wang failed to monitor the ship’s path using GPS.

— East Bay Express, 27 May 2009

In addition, investigations conducted by independent experts from the international maritime community also highlighted the potential effects of insufficient human-machine interface design, contributing to such accidents even though "human error" is often directly used as the main cause without further investigating shortcomings in the HMI. This is, even though HMI has been accepted as a significant factor in aviation accidents for many decades:

Lack of investigation of accidents at sea and the rash classification of the causes in the category of "human error" will help to cover weaknesses in the design of man-machine-interfaces. This is supported by legal regulations for the Bridge Team Management, the high investment cost for ship handling simulators, the low contribution of human-oriented research and its public support, as well as the readiness of manufacturers to develop more integrated and reliable process control systems. Although an inappropriate behaviour of the parties involved in the accident can be proved by the investigation report, the true causes of such accident like the container ship "Cosco Busan" stay in the darkness or in the field of speculation! The faulty design of man-machine-interfaces and deficiencies in information processing and others remain largely unmentioned. Based on a careful analysis of the accident documents the author proves that technical weaknesses were overlooked as well as failures in displaying and processing of information had not been taken into account. For the developers of new support systems and the aimed level of "dependability" of integrated ship bridge systems this is a great disadvantage.

== Responsibility ==
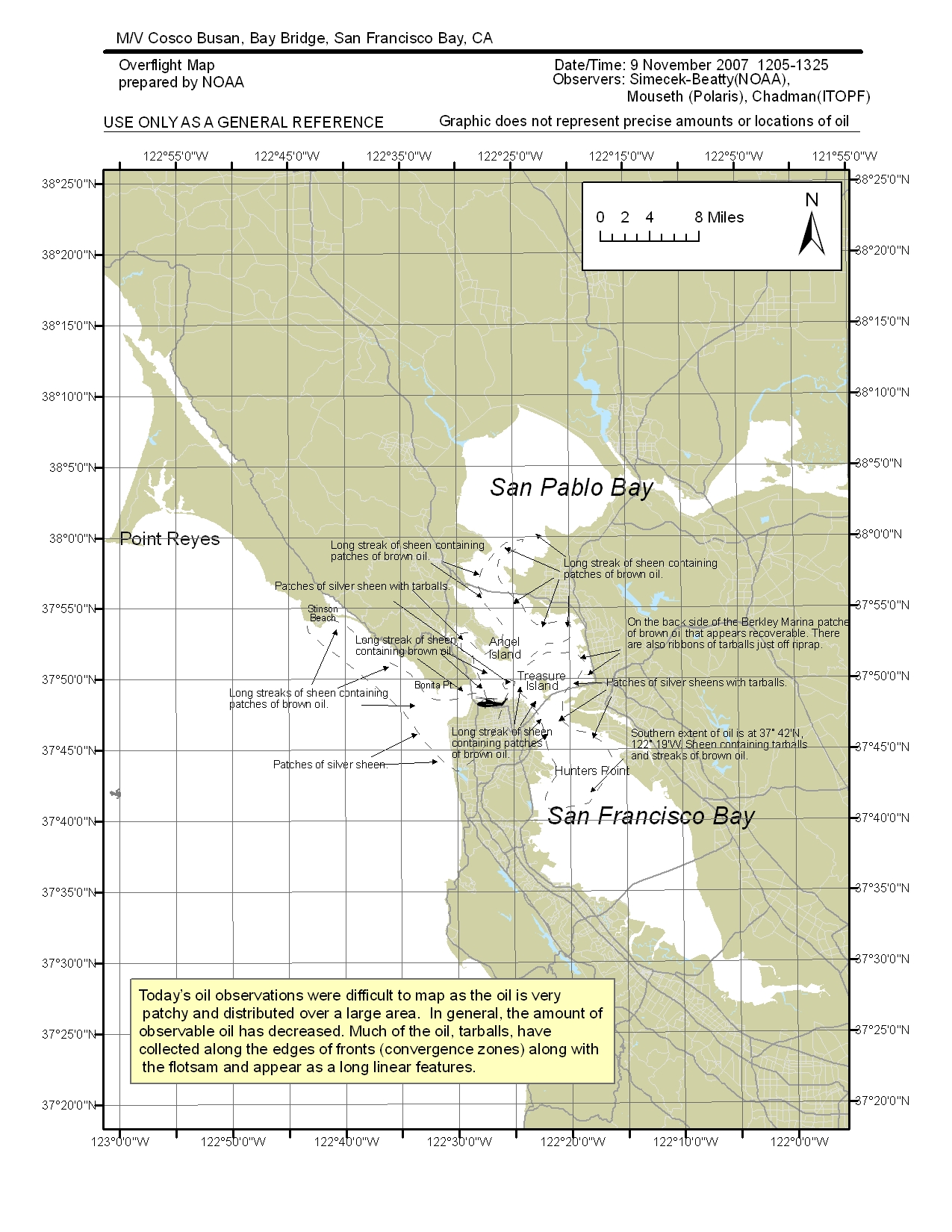
NOAA Overflight Map 2007-11-09 1205–1325

Senator Barbara Boxer and San Francisco Mayor Gavin Newsom criticized the Coast Guard for its response, as its initial reported figures, between 100 and 400 US gal (380 and 1,510 L) of oil, were significantly lower than those of the actual spill.

On Friday 30 November 2007, the United States government filed a lawsuit against the ship and the pilot.

On 23 July 2008, a federal grand jury indicted Fleet Management Ltd. of Hong Kong, the company that operated Cosco Busan. The indictment included six felonies for allegedly falsifying documents to interfere with a federal investigation and two misdemeanor counts of criminal negligence for allegedly helping to cause the spill. The company offered to plead guilty to the misdemeanors. This federal criminal case was resolved when Fleet paid $10 million in fines and restitution. $8 million went to a victim/witness fund and $2 million went to the National Fish and Wildlife Foundation to be used for environmental projects in the Bay Area.

On 23 October 2008, the California state Board of Pilot Commissioners released a report, saying the spill was the result of a series of mistakes by the maritime pilot Captain John Cota. The 18-page report found Cota had made seven serious errors in piloting the ship, including failing to correctly read an electronic chart on the ship, sailing in fog so thick that he could see only 200 feet ahead and sailing at an unsafe speed. Cota faced seven federal charges for spilling oil and killing federally protected birds.

On 6 March 2009, Cota negotiated a plea agreement with prosecutors to federal water pollution and migratory bird killing charges. The agreement called for him to serve two to ten months in prison and included a fine between $3,000 and $30,000. On 10 July, he was sentenced to 10 months imprisonment.

On 19 September 2011, federal, state, and local agencies announced a final comprehensive civil settlement for $44.4 million. It included the following:

- $32.2 million for natural resource damages (to be spent on restoration projects)
- $1.25 million for state penalties.
- $10.9 million for unpaid government response and assessment costs

== Bay Area impact ==
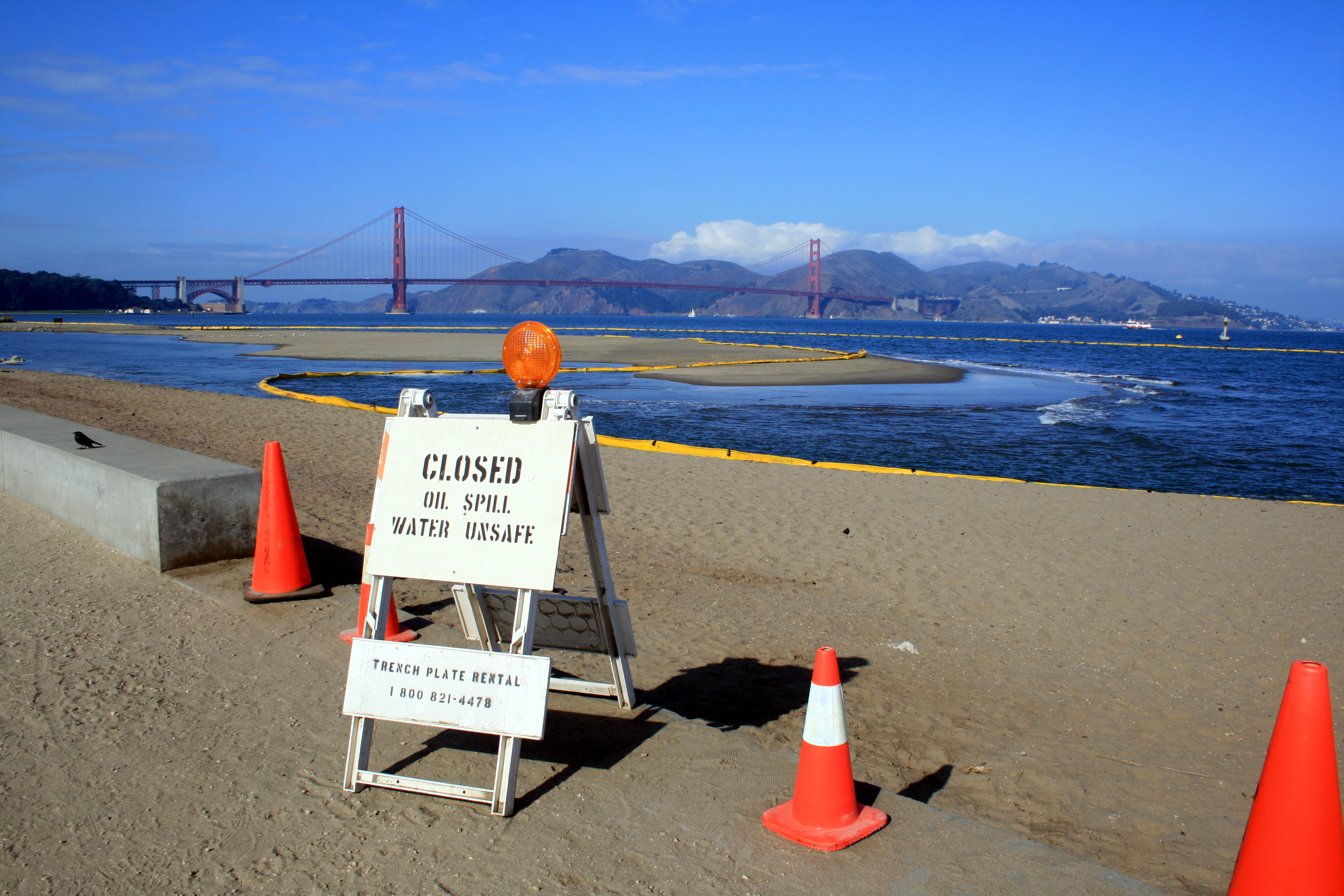
Containment booms languish about the shores and wetlands of Crissy Field.

The tidal mechanics of San Francisco Bay caused the spill to spread rapidly, affecting a large area of the California North Coast, including the Golden Gate National Recreation Area, Ocean Beach and the Marin Headlands.

More than 50 public beaches were closed, including Crissy Field, Fort Point, Baker Beach, China Beach and Kirby Cove.

By 14 November 2007, beaches as far south as Pacifica, California, had been closed due to the spill.

Richmond's shoreline and wildlife were seriously affected by the spill. Beaches and shorelines were closed, but later reopened. However, access was still restricted as of December 2007. The government organizations responsible for the cleanup response and recovery devoted much effort to the East Bay and Rodeo Beach since they were the areas most impacted. The Rodeo Beach and Albany Beach segments were the last ones to be signed off as cleaned because of the additional maintenance and monitoring that were required.

=== Environmental ===
According to the federal and state natural resource trustee agencies, the spill is estimated to have killed 6,849 birds. 2,519 were collected: 1,084 were collected alive (789 of which died; 295 of which were rehabilitated and released) and 1,856 were collected dead. About 200 miles (320 km) of coastline, incorporating 3,367 acres, was oiled. The eggs laid by herring, which typically enter the bay in December, were killed in areas affected by the spill. It is estimated that 14 to 29% of the herring spawn in winter 2007-8 were lost due to the spill.

=== Economic ===
Several fisheries in the Bay Area may have been affected by the spill and the crab and sport fishing seasons were postponed by several weeks. As of 30 November, State biologists had tested more than 1100 samples of fish, mussels and Dungeness crab in San Francisco Bay and coastal waters outside the Golden Gate. The tests found unsafe levels of contaminants in mussels from Rodeo Beach and the Berkeley pier.

An estimated 1,079,900 recreational use days were also lost as a result of the spill. This includes general shoreline use as well as recreational fishing and boating.

Total monetary damages were estimated at $2.1 million for the ship, $1.5 million for the bridge's fender, and more than $70 million for oil spill cleanup.

=== Volunteering ===
Initial official releases from public agencies warned against involvement of volunteers, and worked to deflect volunteers into non-contact activities. This included asking people to act as drivers for bird transport, or as support staff to other efforts. The U.S. Coast Guard directed volunteers to clean non-oiled beaches.

For the first few days OSHA rules were interpreted as requiring HAZWOPER certification, a minimum of 24 hours of classroom time, before involvement in any effort that may result in oil contact. Eventually, and after significant pressure from would-be volunteers, a four-hour "Disaster Service Worker Volunteer Certification" subset of the course was offered. OSHA rules require exactly 240 minutes of classroom time, and the certification is valid for only one incident, e.g., this oil spill.

=== Cleanup timeline ===
Ad-hoc volunteers were discouraged from cleaning beaches during the early days following the spill, as government workers and private contractor The O'Brien's Group handled the official disaster response. On 11 November 2007, cleanup and reports were focused on damage assessment of Cosco Busan. Oil-soaked birds were put in boxes and driven to the San Francisco Bay Oiled Wildlife Care and Education Center in Fairfield to be rehabilitated by University of California, Davis veterinary medical students, and as of 25 November, some birds were returned to the wild.

== Aftermath ==
On 21 December 2007, the Cosco Busan, having been renamed the Hanjin Venezia, sailed out of San Francisco Bay en route to Busan, South Korea, with a new crew working her decks. US$1.5 million in repairs were completed to the bridge fender, three weeks ahead of schedule and $500,000 under budget around the same time.

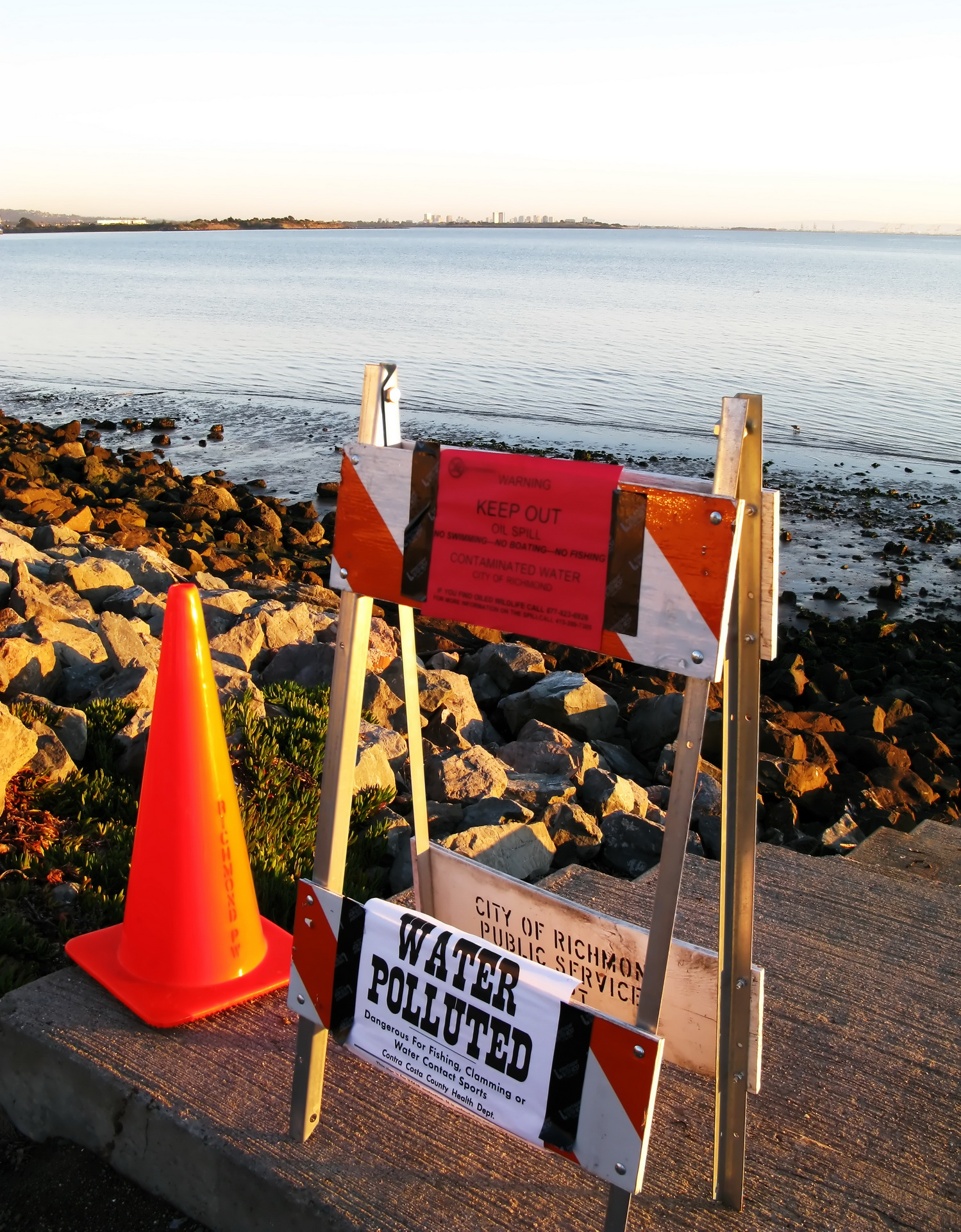
A Contra Costa county sign in Richmond Marina Bay warns of shoreline closure due to oil contamination.

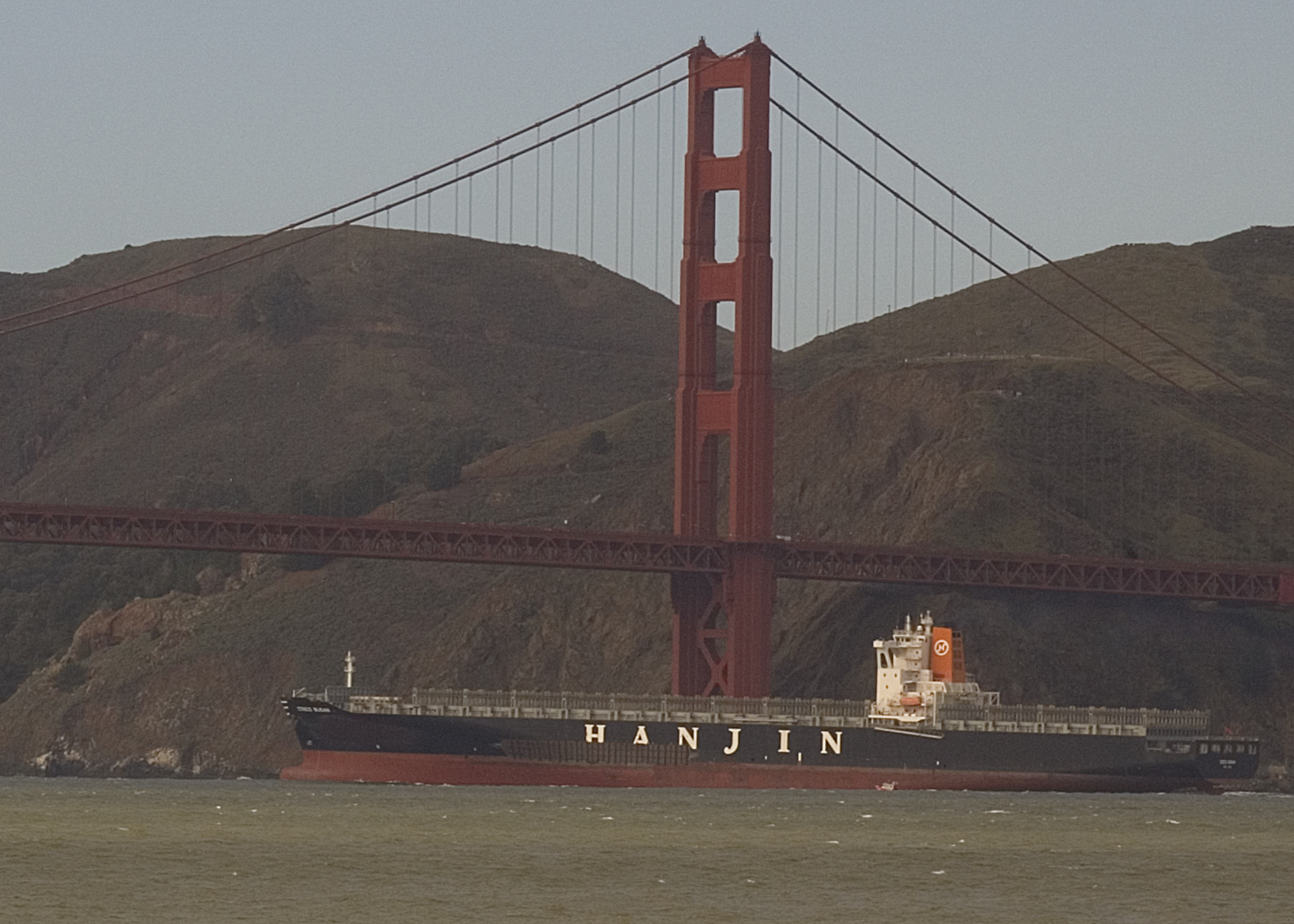
M/V Cosco Busan departing San Francisco under its new name, MSC Hanjin Venezia, approaching the Golden Gate Bridge. Repairs visible on her port side.

== See also ==
- 1971 San Francisco Bay oil spill
- List of oil spills
- SS Cape Mohican oil spill
