= Tobruk Power Station =

- Country: Libya
- Location: Tobruk
- Coordinates: 32°03′22″N 23°58′12″E
- Operator: GECOL

Thermal power station
- Primary fuel: Heavy fuel oil
- Cooling source: Seawater

Power generation
- Nameplate capacity: 130 MW

Tobruk Power Station is a power station in Tobruk, Libya. It is located near the harbour. Its nameplate electrical capacity is 130 MW. The power station is operated by General Electricity Company of Libya (GECOL).

In January 2015, the Black Sea Holdings Company of Turkey agreed to install a 250-MW floating power plant in Tobruk.
