= John Francis (environmentalist) =

American environmentalist

- Born: 1946 (age 79–80); Philadelphia, Pennsylvania, U.S.
- Education: Southern Oregon University (BS); University of Montana (MA); University of Wisconsin–Madison (PhD, 1991)
- Occupation: Environmentalist
- Known for: Not riding in motorized vehicles (1972-1994) Vow of silence (1973-1990) United Nations Environmental Program Goodwill ambassador (1991) Wrote Planetwalker: How to Change Your World One Step at a Time

John H. Francis III (born 1946) is an American environmentalist nicknamed The Planetwalker. Born in Philadelphia, the son of a West Indian immigrant, he moved to Marin County, California, as a young man.

After witnessing the devastation caused by the 1971 San Francisco Bay oil spill, he stopped riding in motorized vehicles, a vow that lasted 22 years from 1972 until 1994. From 1973 until 1990, he also spent 17 years voluntarily silent. During this time, he studied for a PhD in land management and traveled extensively, walking across the entire width of the lower 48 states of the USA as well as walking to South America. He published his memoir Planetwalker: How To Change Your World One Step at a Time (republished as Planetwalker: 17 Years of Silence, 22 Years of Walking) detailing his travels.

== Early life ==
Francis was born in Philadelphia, Pennsylvania in 1946 to parents La Java Kirby and John Francis II. He grew up in the city with his brother Dwayne and often spent summers at his aunt and uncle's farm in Virginia, helping them work the land and grow their own food. Francis moved to Marin County, California in the 1960s. He was raised Catholic and attended Roman Catholic High School, once considering a vocation to the priesthood and monastic life.

== Silent period ==
On January 17, 1971, two oil tankers owned by Standard Oil Company, the Arizona Standard and Oregon Standard, collided in San Francisco Bay, creating an enormous oil spill of 840,000 gallons. After seeing the damage caused, John Francis joked with a friend about never riding in a car again. The following year, a neighbor of Francis' died suddenly. Faced with a new sense of the uncertainty of life, Francis decided to act immediately and for the next 22 years refused to ride in motorized vehicles. Francis describes himself as having had an over-inflated sense of self-importance at this time and says that he initially expected other people to follow his example and also forgo automobiles and other powered vehicles.

As Francis traveled about on foot, people would sometimes stop to talk about what he was doing, and he often found himself arguing with them, as well as with friends and acquaintances, about his decision to go on foot. On his birthday in 1973, Francis decided to stop speaking as a gift to his community, to not argue for one day and instead listen to what others had to say. He found this so valuable that he continued to be silent the next day. This continued and he ended up not speaking for 17 years, with the exception of a phone call to his mother after 10 years of silence. During this time, he communicated by writing and gestures, and also expressed himself by playing the banjo. He ended his vow of silence on Earth Day in 1990. The following day, while in Washington, D.C. he was struck by a car. He managed to convince the ambulance personnel to allow him to walk to the hospital.

== Education ==
While he was silent, Francis completed two college degrees and started a third. In 1971, Francis walked to Ashland, Oregon to enroll in Southern Oregon University where he completed a Bachelor of Science degree in 1981 with credit given for life experience.

Francis then contacted the University of Montana to apply to their graduate environmental studies master's program, letting them know he would not arrive for about two years. During that time, he walked to the state of Washington, built a boat, and walked and sailed to Montana where he completed his master's degree two years later. With little money, he audited classes but professors tracked his grades, and when funds became available to pay for the classes he had taken, they were put on his transcript for credit. As is common with graduate students, Francis taught classes while studying for his master's degree.

Francis then walked to Wisconsin, where he earned a PhD in 1991 in Land Resources from the Nelson Institute for Environmental Studies at the University of Wisconsin-Madison. During his studies, the Exxon Valdez disaster occurred, which brought attention to his research on the effects of oil spills. After completing his degree, he walked to Washington D.C to assist the United States Coast Guard with their response to the disaster.

== Planetwalker: 17 Years of Silence, 22 Years of Walking ==
=== Chapters 1-5 ===
Francis' autiobiography begins with an oil spill that occurred in the Gulf of San Francisco in 1971. John and his girlfriend of the time, Jean, sit in their car and overlook the devastation caused by the spill below as people attempt to save the wildlife and clean up the oil. He struggles to rationalize his lifestyle in the face of such destruction caused by oil, and when a close friend dies a year later, John is finally pushed to stop riding in motorized vehicles.

Jean's daughter gives John a notebook and a set of watercolors, which inspires him to start painting. Starting with a sunset, he makes a New Year's resolution to paint every single day. He also begins to carry his banjo with him as he walks. Despite giving up riding in motorized vehicles, John still feels troubled by the way he argues with others about his lifestyle choices. On his twenty-seventh birthday, he decides to remain silent for the day as a gift to those around him. This day extends to weeks as John begins to appreciate the silence and ability to listen. Greeted with inner turmoil surrounding his prolonged silence, John decides to stay silent until his next birthday. His father hears of his decision to stop speaking and flies to California to check on him, concerned for John’s health.

John decides to live the life of an activist, which inspires him to make a 500-mile journey to Oregon where he will start his college education. On his way back to California, John is confronted by two men who racially harass him and shoot a gun at him. The police show up soon after, but only warn him to leave the area or face consequences.

John’s parents, La Java and John, plan to visit him along with several family members and friends in Sacramento. They watch as he is featured on a local television channel, which does a special on his lifestyle. His parents struggle to understand why he lives the way he does, but they are still supportive.

=== Chapters 6-10 ===
John decides to return to Oregon to further his education. He hikes through the wilderness along the way, meeting several people who work for the US Forest Service. He becomes friends with Ruth and Perry, who operate a mining claim on the Chetco river. The following year he returns with his friend Cherry, who he promised to let accompany him on his trips to Oregon.

Deciding to attend Southern Oregon State College, John enrolls in a prior learning program that will grant him college credit if he is able to demonstrate knowledge gained from life experiences. In two years, he is able to create a portfolio that grants him the 96 credits he needs to graduate.

At his graduation, his father expresses concern about his continued lifestyle of silence. John moves to Sausalito, California to take on an apprenticeship as a boat builder, seeking to eventually make his own boat that he can sail the world with. After his apprenticeship ends, John and a few of his friends start the non-profit Planetwalk, which focuses on raising environmental awareness and education through pilgrimage.

On April 27, 1983, John begins his walking journey to the Northern US, supported by his family and the members of Planetwalk. He aims to walk around the world in 18 years. When he reaches Mount Lassen, he decides to talk to his mother over the phone. It is the first time he has spoken in ten years. As John continues on his journey, he garners more media attention, and his following grows.

Finally reaching Washington, John begins to feel more physically fit and comfortable in his new nomadic lifestyle. He follows the train tracks towards Olympia, and then to Port Townsend where his pilgrimage comes to a pause. He takes a yoga class while he stays in the coastal town, enjoying the nature and cold winter weather. He begins construction on his first boat, which is a small dory. After finishing his boat, coined the Twana, John sells his home in Port Townsend and he prepares to resume his walking journey.

=== Chapters 11-15 ===
After selling the boat to his friend Ingrid, John travels along the coast and camps in several state parks with his friend Irene. They deal with severe weather, including rain, thunderstorms, and severe wind as they move from cabin to cabin within the parks.

On September 29, 1984, John crosses the border from Washington to Idaho. By October 10 of the same year, he has crossed the panhandle and reached the border of Montana. He heads to Missoula, where two years prior he was accepted into the University of Montana’s graduate environmental studies program. He is able to enroll in an independent study class on water problems. Remaining in Wyoming, he completes his graduate studies and earns a teaching assistantship through the University. Upon graduating in 1986 with a master's degree in environmental studies, John finally leaves Missoula.

As he prepares to cross the Arco Dessert, John encounters an obstacle, realizing he will have to walk through the US Atomic Energy Commission Reservation, which is illegal. He carries on, despite his concerns over his safety and access to water. He struggles to maintain his water source as he travels through the desert, growing anxious as helicopters comb the forest at night.

In October 1986, he reaches South Dakota, where he is immediately met with the sight of missile silos. He worries over the use of nuclear weapons and how they will impact the future of humanity and the environment. He travels across the state, battling the harsh winter as he approaches the border of Minnesota. After a harsh storm, John is forced to pause his walking until the weather improves.

=== Chapters 16-20 ===
John remains in the town of Watertown, South Dakota as he waits for the winter season to end. He starts a job at a local printing press to make ends meet. During his time there, he organizes a powwow with a small group of Sioux residents from the Pine Ridge Reservation. In May, John finally leaves Watertown, heading for the University of Wisconsin-Madison to continue his education.

As John travels through Minnesota, his progress is slowed due to ankle pain, which frustrates him. He admires the agricultural lands and often speaks with farmers when he stops for food or rest. In May 1987, John finally reaches Wisconsin.

Once John reaches Madison, his pilgrimage once again is put on hold. He receives a fellowship through the university to begin his doctoral studies. He chooses the research topic of oil spill cost and management off of the US coast. In 1989, John finishes his studies at the University of Wisconsin-Madison and decides to return to his home of Pennsylvania. On his way, he passes through Illinois, Indiana, Ohio, and West Virginia. By January 2, 1990, John finally reaches the East Coast.

On April 22, 1990, John breaks his vow of silence on Earth Day to speak in honor of the environment. On the way to a meeting in Washington D.C, John is hit by a car on his bike. He refuses the ambulance that arrives and instead decides to walk the 15 blocks to the hospital, despite his injuries. While in Washington D.C., John gets a job as an assistant at the United Nations Environment Programme. He is also able to defend his thesis over the phone, which earns him his doctorate from the University of Wisconsin-Madison.

In 1991, John leaves Washington D.C. to return to Philadelphia. Soon after he arrives, he is offered a position to work for the Coast Guard, writing legislation for the new Oil Pollution Act. Though he feels vastly different than his co-workers, he is able to become close friends with several of them and create legislation in defense of the environment. He is given a civilian service award by the Coast Guard for his work on the project. After a year and two months with the Coast Guard, he decides to leave and continue his pilgrimage.

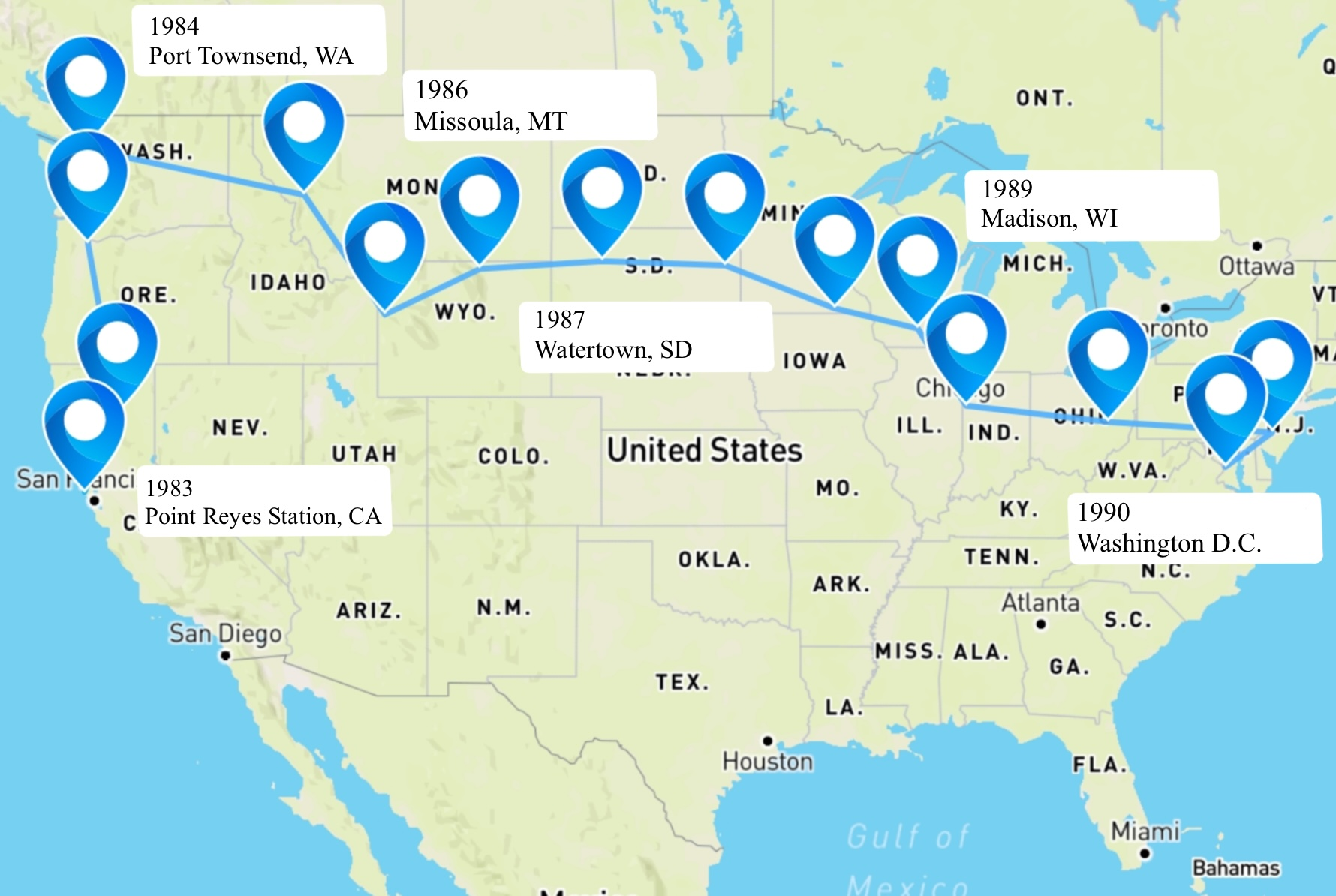
The approximate route that John Francis walked on his pilgrimage across the United States (1983-1990).

== Career ==
In 1990, after finishing his degrees, Francis worked for the United States Coast Guard in Washington D.C where he wrote oil spill regulations following the Exxon Valdez disaster in Alaska. Francis received the U.S. Department of Transportation's Public Service Commendation in recognition of his efforts. In 1991, he was appointed United Nations Environmental Program Goodwill ambassador to the World's Grassroots Communities. In 1994, Francis decided he could be a more effective environmentalist if he began to again use motorized transportation. At the border of Venezuela and Brazil, he boarded a bus.

Francis is a founder and program director of Planetwalk, a non-profit environmental awareness organization. In 2005, he published Planetwalker: How to Change Your World One Step at a Time (later republished by the National Geographic Society as Planetwalker: 17 Years of Silence, 22 Years of Walking). In 2010, Francis also became the first ever National Geographic Society Education Fellow and the National Geographic Society published his work The Ragged Edge of Silence: Finding Peace in a Noisy World.

In 2009, he was in Australia, walking the Great Ocean Road for a film being made by Tourism Victoria.

From 2011-2012, Francis was a visiting associate professor at the Nelson Institute for Environmental Studies at the University of Wisconsin-Madison.

In 2022, Francis' children’s book Human Kindness: True Stories of Compassion and Generosity That Changed the World, illustrated by Josy Bloggs, was published by What on Earth Publishing.

Francis is a former commissioner of West Cape May, New Jersey. As of 2022, he is currently planning his final solo planet walk across the continent of Africa.

== Bibliography ==
- Francis, J., Planetwalker: How to Change Your World One Step at a Time, Elephant Mountain Press, (Point Reyes Station), 2005. ISBN 0-9760192-0-5
  - Second edition, National Geographic Society (as Planetwalker: 17 Years of Silence, 22 Years of Walking).
- Francis, J., The Ragged Edge of Silence: Finding Peace in a Noisy World, National Geographic Society, 2010.
- Francis, J., Human Kindness: True Stories of Compassion and Generosity That Changed the World, illustrated by Josy Bloggs, What on Earth Publishing, 2022.
