= Full City =

Coordinates: 58°58′15″N 9°42′38″E

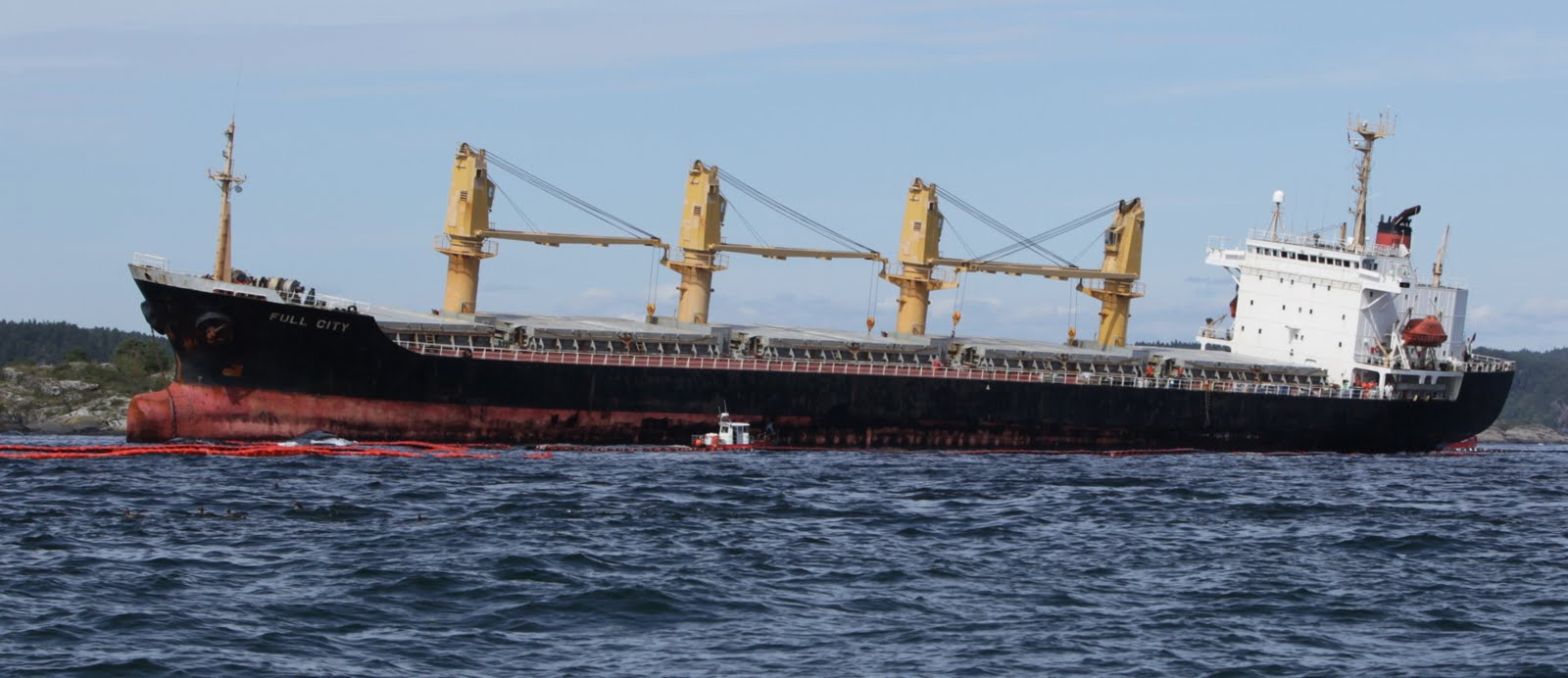
- Full City stranded on rocks outside of Langesund, Norway.

History

Panama
- Name: Full City
- Owner: The Roc Maritime Inc.
- Operator: COSCO HK
- Port of registry: Panama
- Builder: Hakodate Dockyard Co. Ltd.; Hakodate, Hokkaidō, Japan
- Yard number: 755
- Launched: 9 August 1994
- Completed: 1995
- Identification: IMO number: 9073672; Call Sign: 3FRQ4; MMSI: 354459000

General characteristics
- Tonnage: 26,758 DWT; 15,873 GT
- Length: 167 m (548 ft)
- Beam: 26 m (85 ft)
- Draught: 9.54 m (31.3 ft)
- Propulsion: Kobe Diesel 1D 2 SA 6 CY, 5 kW.
- Speed: 17 kn (31 km/h; 20 mph)

Full City is a Panama-flagged bulk carrier made infamous by running aground after an engine failure during a storm at the island of Saastein (Såstein) outside Langesund, Telemark, Norway, spilling 700 tons of heavy bunker fuel oil in a sensitive wildlife refuge area on 31 July 2009. Full City was built by Hakodate Dockyard Co. Ltd. in Hakodate, Hokkaidō, Japan in 1995. The vessel was pulled off the rocks and first towed to Stathelle, and later to Gothenburg for full drydock repairs.

On 5 May 2011, as part of NATO's counter-piracy Operation Ocean Shield, the carrier USS Carl Vinson, the cruiser USS Bunker Hill, and the Turkish frigate Giresun responded to a distress call from Full City. An Indian Navy Tu-142 maritime patrol aircraft located Full City, and while Giresun boarded the merchant vessel, Bunker Hill intercepted a dhow believed to be the 'mothership' for the pirate attack. Bunker Hill's VBSS boarding party seized weapons and other equipment commonly used in piracy, and the boarding party also sank a small skiff being towed by the dhow. Giresun's boarding party found Full City's Chinese crew safe and in control of their ship.

== See also ==
- List of oil spills
- Full City oil spill
