= Full City oil spill =

2009 oil spill in Norway

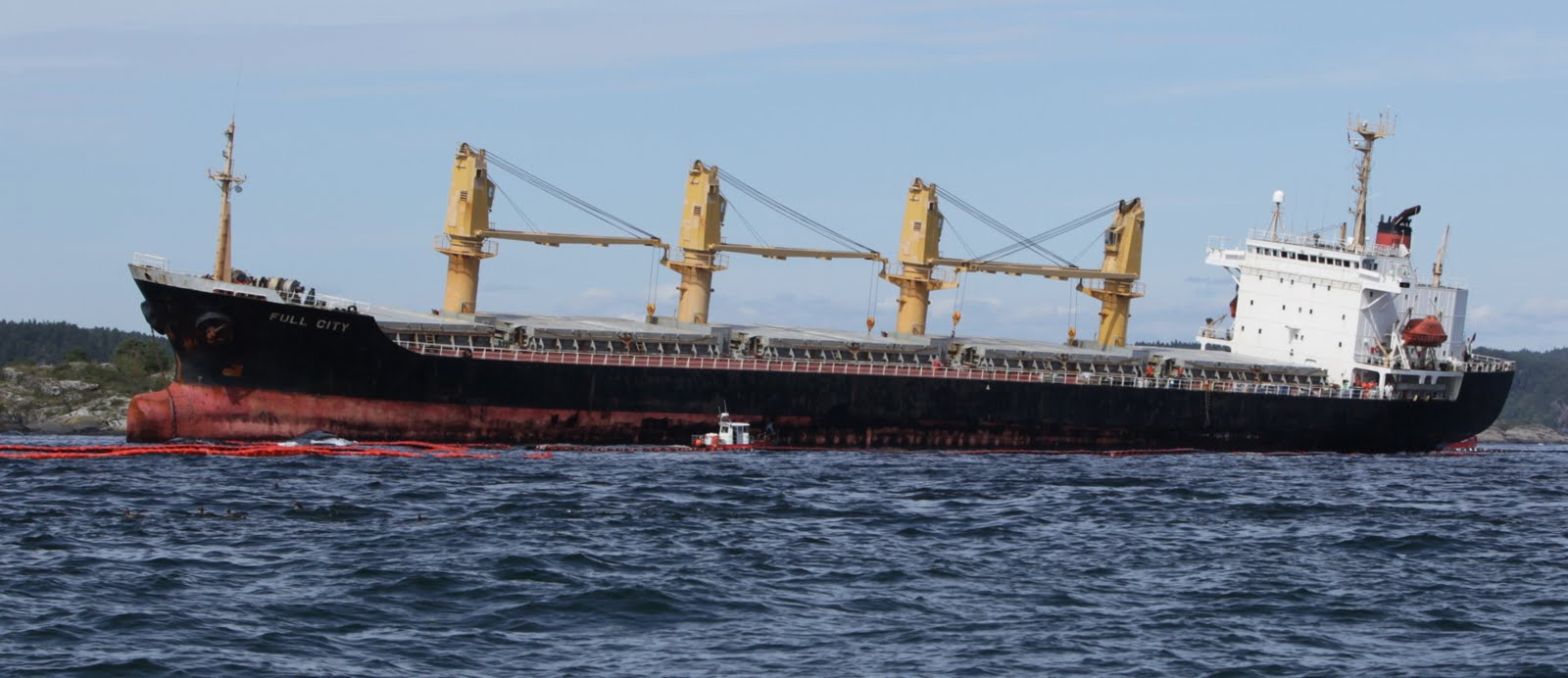
- Full City aground on the island of Saastein / Såstein
- Coordinates: 58.970833°N 9.710556°E
- Date: 31 July 2009

Cause
- Cause: The ships anchor slipped, the vessel crew failed to start the main engine during a storm, and the vessel ran aground on Lille Såstein Bird Sanctuary.
- Operator: COSCO HK

Spill characteristics
- Volume: 200,000 kg
- Shoreline impacted: 75 km (47 mi)

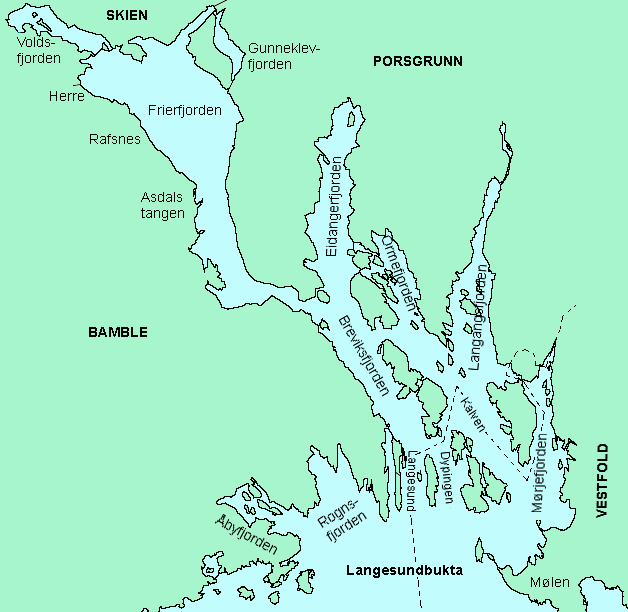
Såstein is the island to the left of the text Rognsfjorden

The Full City oil spill was a major fuel oil spill incident that occurred on July 31, 2009 when the bulk carrier Full City ran aground on the island of Såstein, south of Langesund, Telemark, Norway. The ship, said to be operated by a HK subsidiary of COSCO with 23 crew members on board, spilled around 200 tons of IFO-380 heavy fuel oil, as well as 120 tons of diesel fuel. The oil contaminated 75 kilometers of Norwegian coastline, including Langesund, Vestfold, and the Lille Såstein Bird Sanctuary. There were oil slicks in approximately 200 locations along the shoreline between Larvik Municipality and Lilles.

Days before the incident, ships were alerted about a gale in Skagerrak. The following day there were warning alerts for gale of Beaufort scale level 10 towards the southeast, which persisted throughout the day. The ship suffered engine failure and ran aground in stormy conditions that evening. The winds started to decrease and eventually stop a couple hours after the oil spill. The Norwegian Safety Investigation Authority informed that the Full City drifted toward Såstein approximately at 9:50 pm, due to strong winds and waves from southwest. Conservationists critiqued how authorities prioritized the 23 crew members instead of acting rapidly to set up barriers.

After the accident the wind speed suddenly decreased, with calm conditions being present on the first of August. Decreased wind allowed for the oil to be contained more easily. Significant oil slicks were seen north-northeast of the accident. Areas southeast of the accident contained a large amount of oil approximately two days after the spill. Exact details regarding the amount of oil spilled remains unknown, and further observations of the southwest amount of oil remains undetermined. The amount of oil found was low in the southeast 50 km range from the spill.

The oil spill was reported at night and the oil spill response actions started working the next day. A large amount of the oil spilled in ecologically sensitive areas, including a sea bird sanctuary that was home to 2000 eider, covering thousands of the birds in oil. Although volunteers made efforts to save them, many of the birds had to be euthanized due to the irreversible damage to their health. On Sunday August 2, 2009 a group of environmental specialists began working at a rapid rate to clean up the disaster that was left behind from the oil. It took over 16,000 weekdays to restore the coastline and clean the entirety of the oil spill. The total estimated cost for all of this work to reverse the harm of the spill was about 25 million Euros. 2 million Euros were used for a program of environmental monitoring of the affected area until 2014.

The Institute of Marine Research ran tests on the affected areas to track any significant ecological impacts but noted that the marine and fish life suffered no significant impacts. The research was included in a study of four oil spills that occurred in the Norwegian coastal area, including the Rocknes Oil Spill, the Server Oil Spill, and the Godafoss Oil Spill.

The Master and Third Officer of the ship were both charged with violating the Pollution Control Act due to their failure to take adequate measures to prevent pollution of the marine environment from this accident. The master was also found guilty of violating the Ship Safety and Security Act. The Master was sentenced to 6 months with 120 days suspended, and the Third Officer was sentenced to 60 days with 39 days suspended. Officials feared that they would evade punishment, however, both of these individuals were detained in Norway for four and a half months. However, they were released on bail; coming back to Norway from China, presenting themselves in front of the Supreme Court. As of April 2010 the ship was in Gothenburg for repairs in dry dock.

== See also ==
- List of oil spills
- MARPOL 73/78 - Environmental agreement
