= Crissy Field =

Former U.S. Army airfield, now part of Golden Gate National Recreation Area

Coordinates: 37.8042°N 122.4597°W

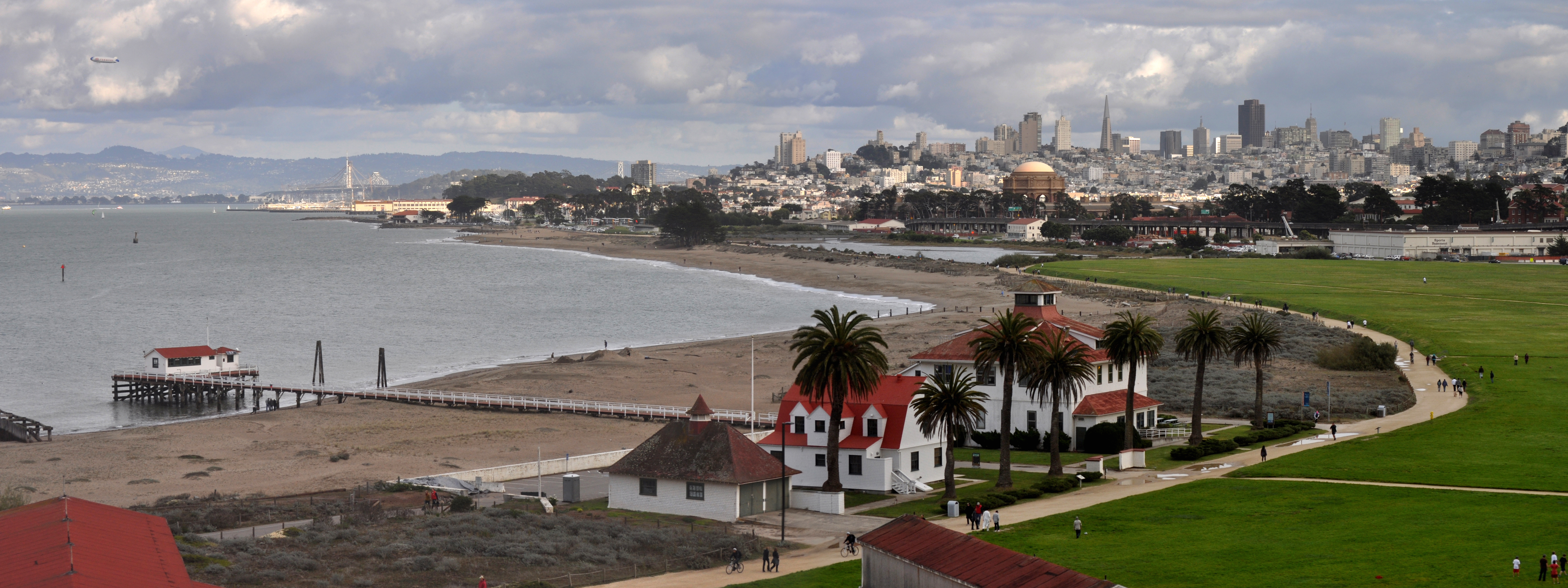
Crissy Field and the San Francisco skyline in 2011. The remaining structures of the former USCG Fort Point Life Boat Station (LBS) are in the foreground.

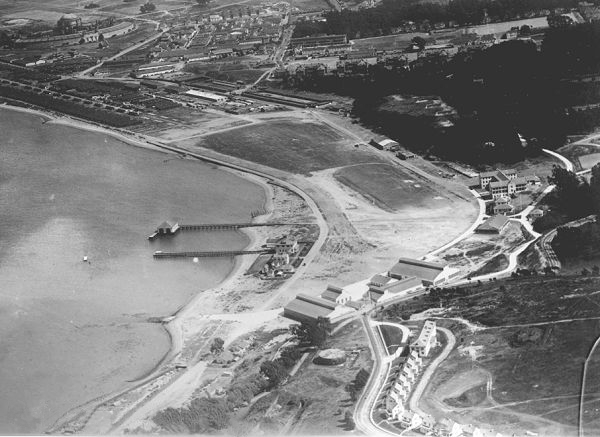
Aerial view of Crissy Field 1922–23, hangars and quarters in lower center. The H-shaped building at right center is the enlisted barracks.

Crissy Field is a public recreation area on the northern shore of the San Francisco Peninsula in California, United States, located just east of the Golden Gate Bridge. It includes restored tidal marsh and beaches.

Crissy Field is a former United States Army airfield which is now part of the Golden Gate National Recreation Area. Historically part of the Presidio of San Francisco, Crissy Field closed as an airfield after 1974. Under Army control, the site was affected by dumping of hazardous materials. The National Park Service took control of the area in 1994 and, together with the Golden Gate National Parks Conservancy, worked to restore the site until 2001, when the Crissy Field Center was opened to the public. While most buildings have been preserved as they were in the 1920s, some have been transformed into offices, retail space, and residences.

== History ==
The land Crissy Field resides on is an ancient 130 acres (53 ha) salt marsh and estuary. Prior to European settlement, the Ohlone people used the area for harvesting shellfish and fish. They also lived in seasonal camps in the area, leaving behind shell middens in the archaeological record. The Spanish arrived in 1776 and called the area El Presidio. They began to use the area for livestock grazing and agriculture. The 127 acres (51 ha) marsh site was filled in during the 1870s. This alteration was finished in time for the 1915 Panama Pacific International Exposition nearby. The U.S. Army took control of the Presidio in 1846, using the tidal wetland as a wasteland for dumping and draining. After filling in the marshlands, the Army covered over it and created an aerodrome.

=== Air Service and Air Corps facility ===
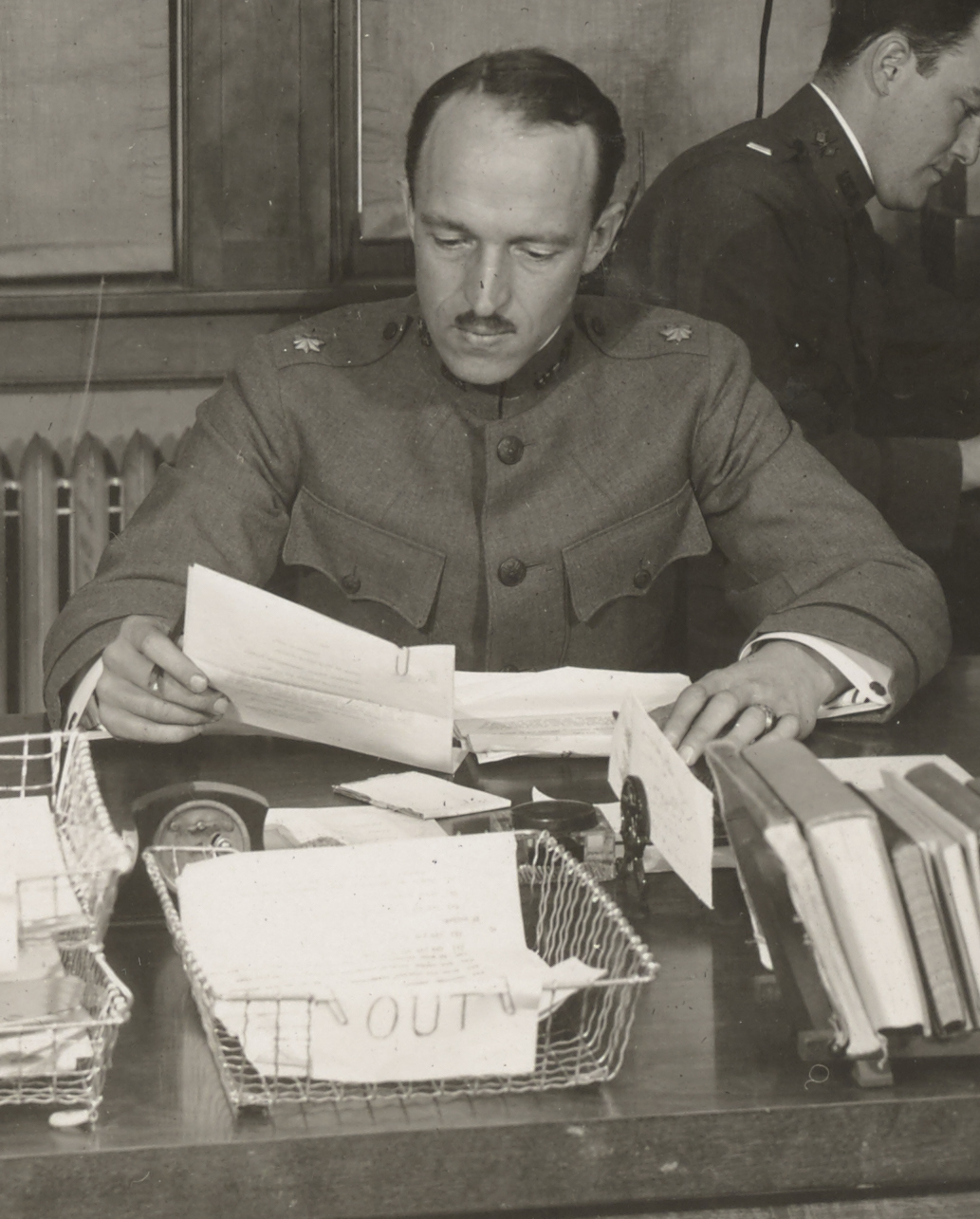
Major Dana H. Crissy on December 20, 1917, at the School of Military Aeronautics of Princeton University

During World War I, the Army constructed numerous temporary buildings on the site of the 1915 Panama–Pacific International Exposition at the Presidio of San Francisco and linked it to Fort Mason with a rail spur. In July 1918, Congress passed Public Law 189 to establish eight "air coast defense stations" and appropriated $1.5 million for the construction of one of them at the Presidio, to protect San Francisco Bay. In June 1919, the Army assigned Colonel Henry H. Arnold of the Air Service as Air Officer, Western Department, and directed him to convene a board of four officers to select the site. The board chose the former exposition site as much for its sheltered beach to protect seaplane operations as the fact that the infield of its racetrack was already in use as an aviation field. Although the wartime appropriations were reduced by the end of the war, demolition of buildings posing a landing hazard began in the fall of 1919.

The east–west clay and sand landing field was kidney-shaped with the outline of the racetrack still visible. The western end of the field featured hangars, workshops and a garage for the army. To the immediate east along the southern edge was the guardhouse in Classical/Mediterranean Revival Style architecture, the administrative building in American Craftsman/Mediterranean Revival, and a two-story enlisted barracks in Mission Revival Style. The bluff overlooking the field had the row of officer's quarters. Arnold led the effort to name the facility "Crissy Field" in memory of Major Dana H. Crissy, the base commander of Mather Field, California. Crissy and his observer died on 8 October 1919 in the crash of their de Havilland DH-4B while attempting a landing at Salt Lake City, Utah, during a 61-airplane "transcontinental reliability and endurance test" conducted by the Air Service from the Presidio's field and Roosevelt Field, New York. Construction proceeded throughout 1920, including a seaplane ramp adjacent to the Coast Guard Station on the grounds, and the Army accepted the facility on June 24, 1921, as a sub-post of the Presidio. The first unit assigned to the field, the 91st Observation Squadron, arrived from Mather in August, and its first commanding officer, Major George H. Brett, arrived in October.

In the early years, Crissy Field involved mainly the viewing of artillery fire, aerial photography, liaison flights for headquarter personnel, special civilian missions such as publicity flights and search and rescues, and a support field for U.S. Air Mail. The first Western aerial forest fire patrols took place from Crissy Field.

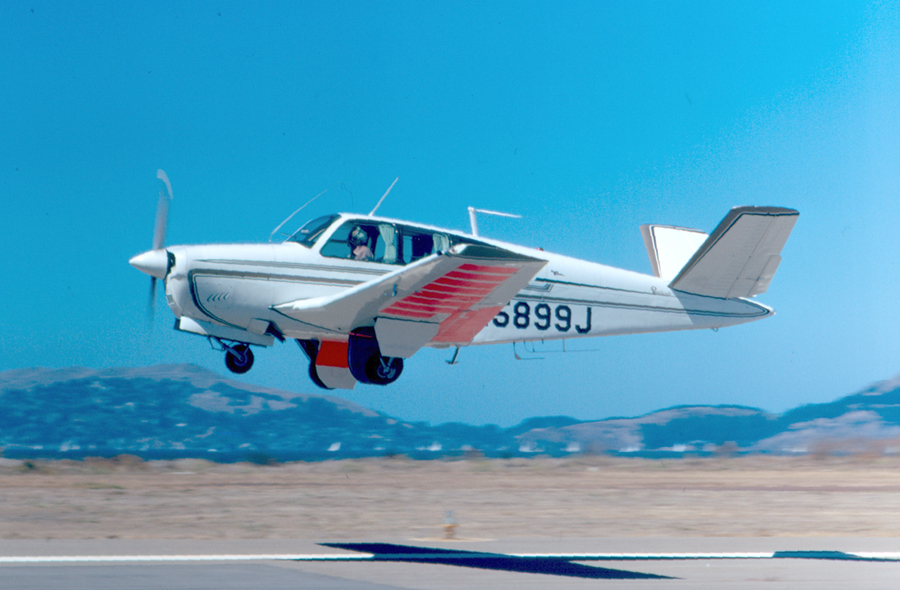
General aviation takeoff at Crissy Field in 1972

The first successful dawn-to-dusk transcontinental flight across the United States ended at Crissy Field in June 1924. That same year, the army's first aerial circumnavigation of the world stopped at Crissy Field, and Lowell H. Smith, who was stationed at the field, led the flyers upon their return. In 1925, two Navy flying boats led by Commander John Rodgers took off from Crissy Field, marking the first attempt to fly from the continental United States to Hawaii. The flight was expected to take 26-hours, but it took twelve days when the PN-9 ran out of fuel short of land, and crew and aircraft had to be rescued at sea. Two years later Air Corps Lieutenants Lester Maitland and Albert Hegenberger flew non-stop to Hawaii in the Bird of Paradise, a specially modified transport plane, after staging at Crissy Field.

Originally, Crissy Field was considered ideal for air operations. However, wind and fog often made for poor flying conditions, construction of the Golden Gate Bridge threatened to make local flights more difficult, and the 3,000-foot (910 m) runway was too short for more heavily loaded aircraft. The Army also considered Crissy Field vulnerable to possible enemy ship attacks due to its location on the water's edge of the San Francisco Bay. In 1936, Hamilton Field opened in Marin County, and while Crissy Field ceased to be a first-line air base, air operations continued until the 1970s.

=== After the air corps and closure ===
When the air corps left, the administration building served as the headquarters for the 30th Infantry Regiment, and the landing field was used as an assembly area for troop mobilization. During World War II, temporary wooden barracks and classrooms were built on site for the army's Military Intelligence Service Language School. Nisei soldiers were also trained as battlefield interpreters, as well.

After World War II, a paved runway replaced the grass landing field and the Sixth Army Flight Detachment used Crissy Field for light utility and passenger planes, and helicopter operations. During the Vietnam war, the Army used Crissy Field for liaison flights and MedEvac flights to transport wounded Vietnam soldiers 40 miles (64 km) from Travis Air Force Base to the Presidio's Letterman Army Hospital, as a trip by ambulance on surface roads would take too long and possibly be delayed by traffic into San Francisco. At the end of the Vietnam war in 1974, the Army closed Crissy Field to airplanes, though helicopter operations continued for several years.

As part of a national reduction in the number of functioning military bases, the Army decommissioned the Presidio in 1994, leaving Crissy Field “a jumble of asphalt and forsaken buildings” in the hands of the National Park Service."

== National Park Service ==
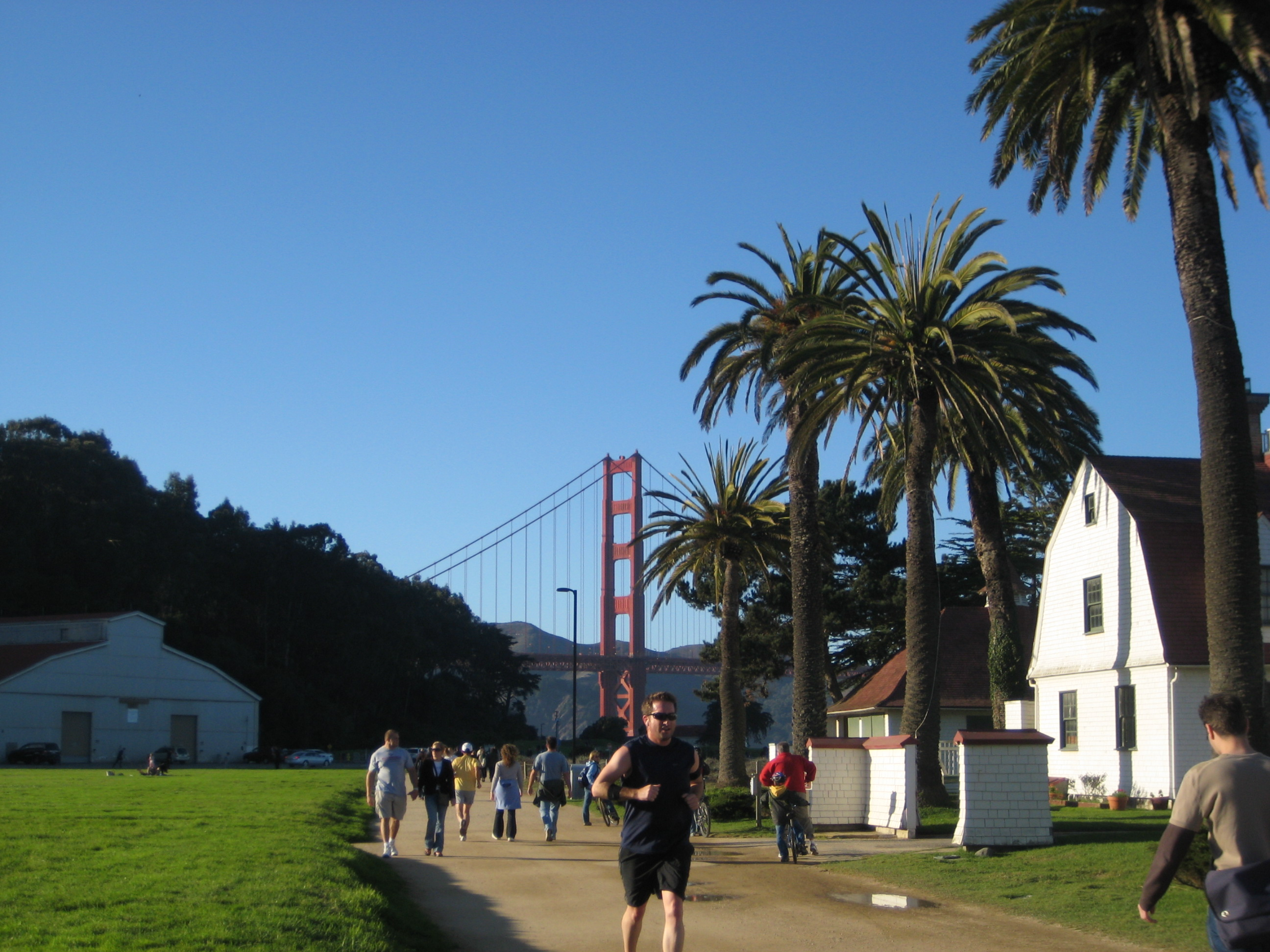
Crissy Field in 2007. The structures at right were the quarters of the Coast Guard Station, and the seaplane hangar is in the background.

In 1994, the National Park Service (NPS) took over the Presidio, and Crissy Field was declared a "derelict concrete wasteland" by NPS. Due to environmental concerns about the former airfield, NPS and the Environmental Protection Agency used funds to monitor the area's chemical, biological and physical variables. NPS eventually worked with the Golden Gate National Parks Conservancy to revitalize the area, and the Crissy Field Center was opened to the public in 2001.

== Restoration ==
San Francisco landscape architecture firm Hargreaves Associates was in charge of restoration of Crissy Field. The principal landscape architects were George Hargreaves and Mary Margaret Jones. Hargreaves and Jones advocated an "ecological approach to planning, the preservation and restoration of natural systems, and the notion of sustainable landscape." During the planning stages of the project, Hargreaves and Associates participated in public meetings and feedback session to interface with the local community.

The largest contribution for the restoration of Crissy Field came from the Evelyn and Walter Haas Jr. and Harold and Mimi Haas Foundations, totaling $18 million ($13.5 million from the Haas Jr. Fund and $4.5 million from Colleen and Robert Haas), surpassing the NPS's $16 million. Pledged in 1997 this grant was the largest cash gift in National Park Service history at that time. The rest of the money came from members of the public. Some 2,400 people made donations towards the $34.4 million raised for Crissy Field, of which 2,200 were $100 or less. The Haas Fund granted an additional $1.5 million in 2007 and $2.5 million in 2015.

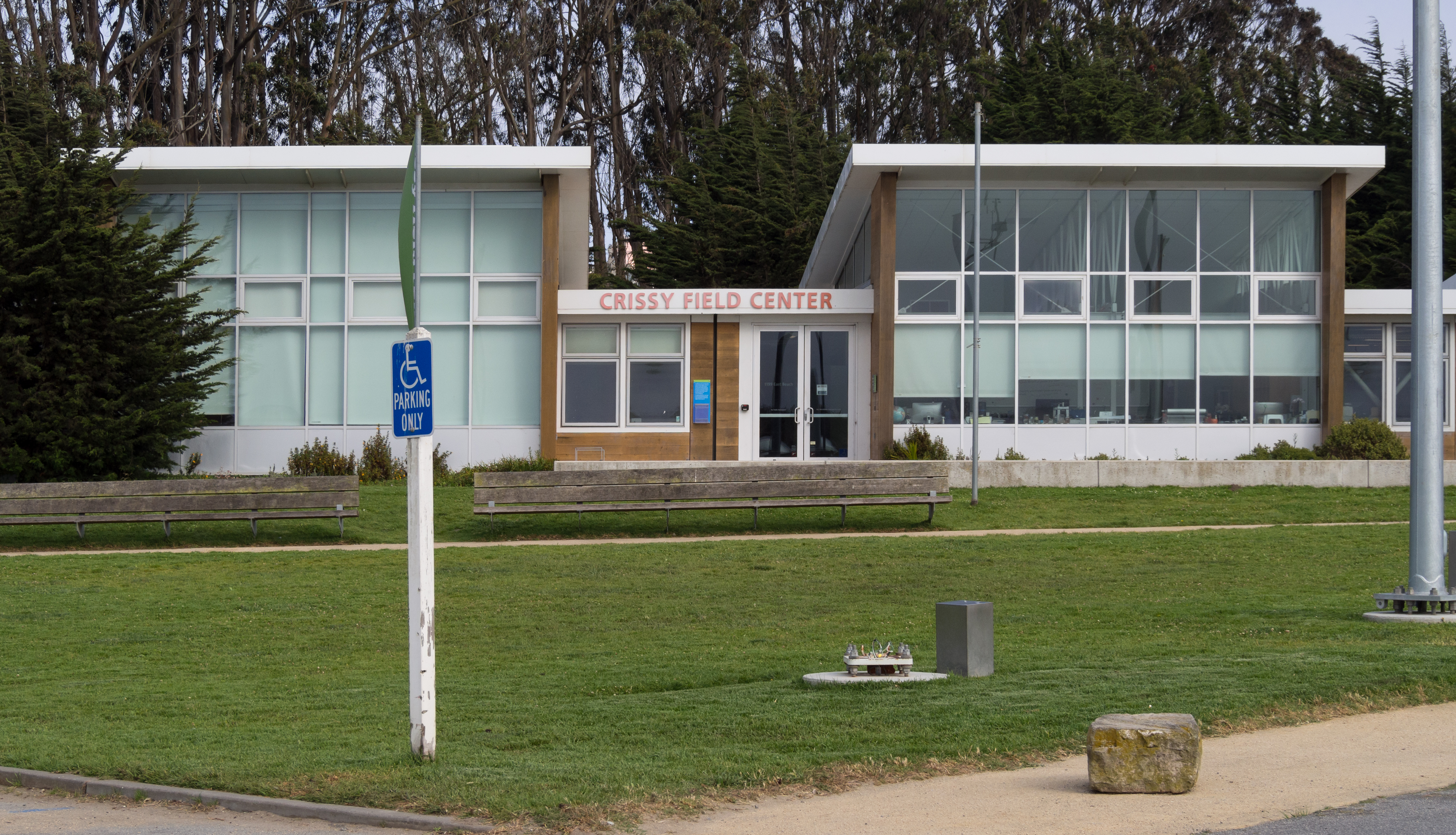
Crissy Field Center

Experts handled specialized work such as the design and construction process, removal of hazardous materials, and testing and monitoring of the estuary and marsh, but those parts of the project that could be shared were delegated to the wider community of stakeholders. Approximately 3,000 volunteers, ranging from neighbors to elementary students, spent 2,400 hours planting 100,000 plants representing 73 native species.

Crissy Field presented the challenge of the “restoration of a culturally significant grass military airfield” overlapping much of the same landscape as the tidal marsh, affecting “the ability to restore the marsh to the pre-military configuration, to an idealized ‘natural’ condition." In order to create the new site, 87,000 tons of hazardous materials were removed from the site itself and the tidal wetlands were redesigned to simulate the wetlands that existed before the military appropriated the site and used the area as a dump and landfill location. The site provides great views of the San Francisco bay area, Alcatraz and the Golden Gate Bridge.

The completed Crissy Field reopened in 2001. New and rebuilt sidewalks, boardwalks, and trails connect the field north to Fort Point, the Warming Hut (a cafe), and south to the Crissy Field Center, an environmental education center, and the Marina District.

== Description ==
Crissy Field is now part of an urban national park, which, due to its location and scenic views, is visited by both locals and tourists.

=== Features ===
1. West Bluff — the westernmost part of Crissy Field, which includes a picnic area, the Warming Hut cafe, and connector paths and trails to the Golden Gate Bridge and Fort Point.
2. Beach and dunes — the shoreline along Crissy Field has been restored, including the creation of sand dunes which provide habitat for several native species.
3. Promenade and trails — The Golden Gate Promenade runs from the Crissy Field Center adjacent to the beach to the Warming Hut. This is also a section of the San Francisco Bay Trail, which runs along the coast of the San Francisco Bay.
4. Crissy Marsh — The restored tidal marsh hosts 17 fish species and 135 species of birds have been seen there. Around the tidal marsh, native vegetation has been planted and a boardwalk across the marsh has been constructed, providing views of the wildlife.
5. Crissy Field Center — An environmental education center for youth that provides school-year and summer programs.
6. Cross Country Course — Home to the USF Men's and Women's cross country teams.
7. Warming Hut Park Store — Shop with books, souvenirs, drinks and snacks for sale. Purchases support the Parks Conservancy and Crissy Field Center.

=== Mark di Suvero Sculptures ===
In May 2013, SFMOMA, in partnership with the National Park Service and Golden Gate National Parks Conservancy, displayed eight of Mark di Suvero's sculptures on Crissy Field.

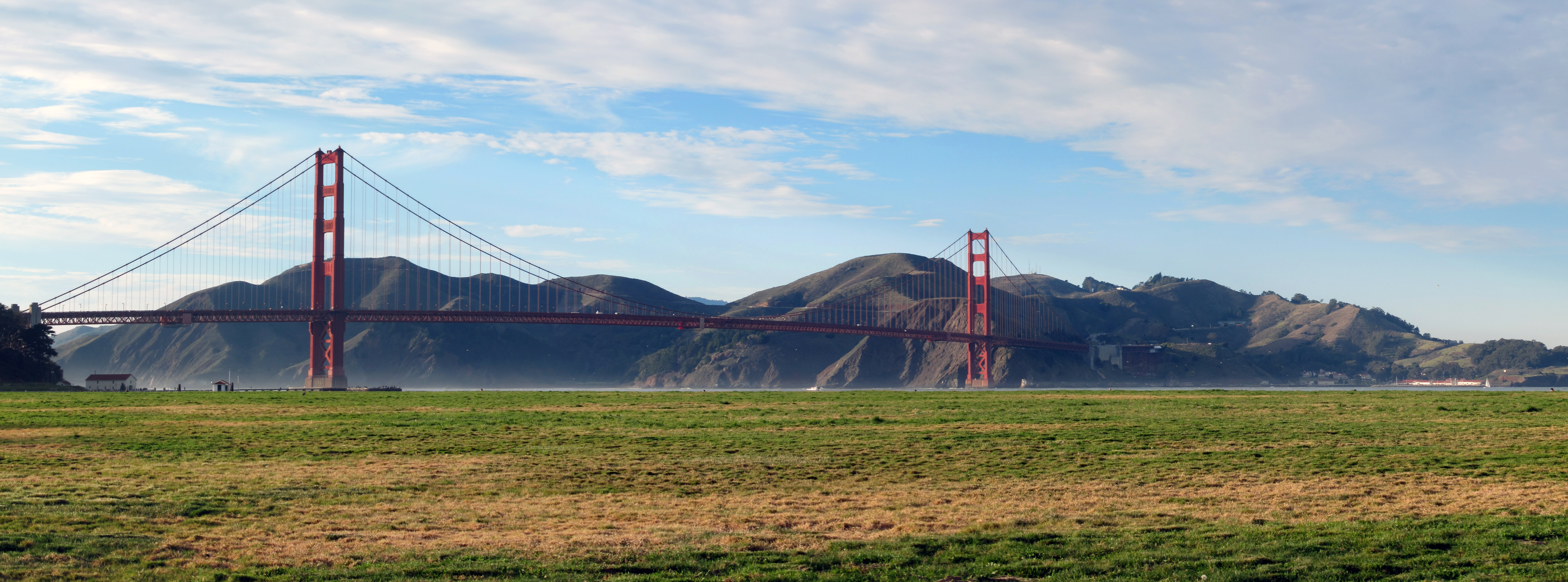
Panoramic image of Crissy Field with the Golden Gate Bridge and the Marin Headlands seen in the background

== See also ==
- 49-Mile Scenic Drive
- List of beaches in California
- List of California state parks
