= Heavy fuel oil =

Fuel oils of a tar-like consistency

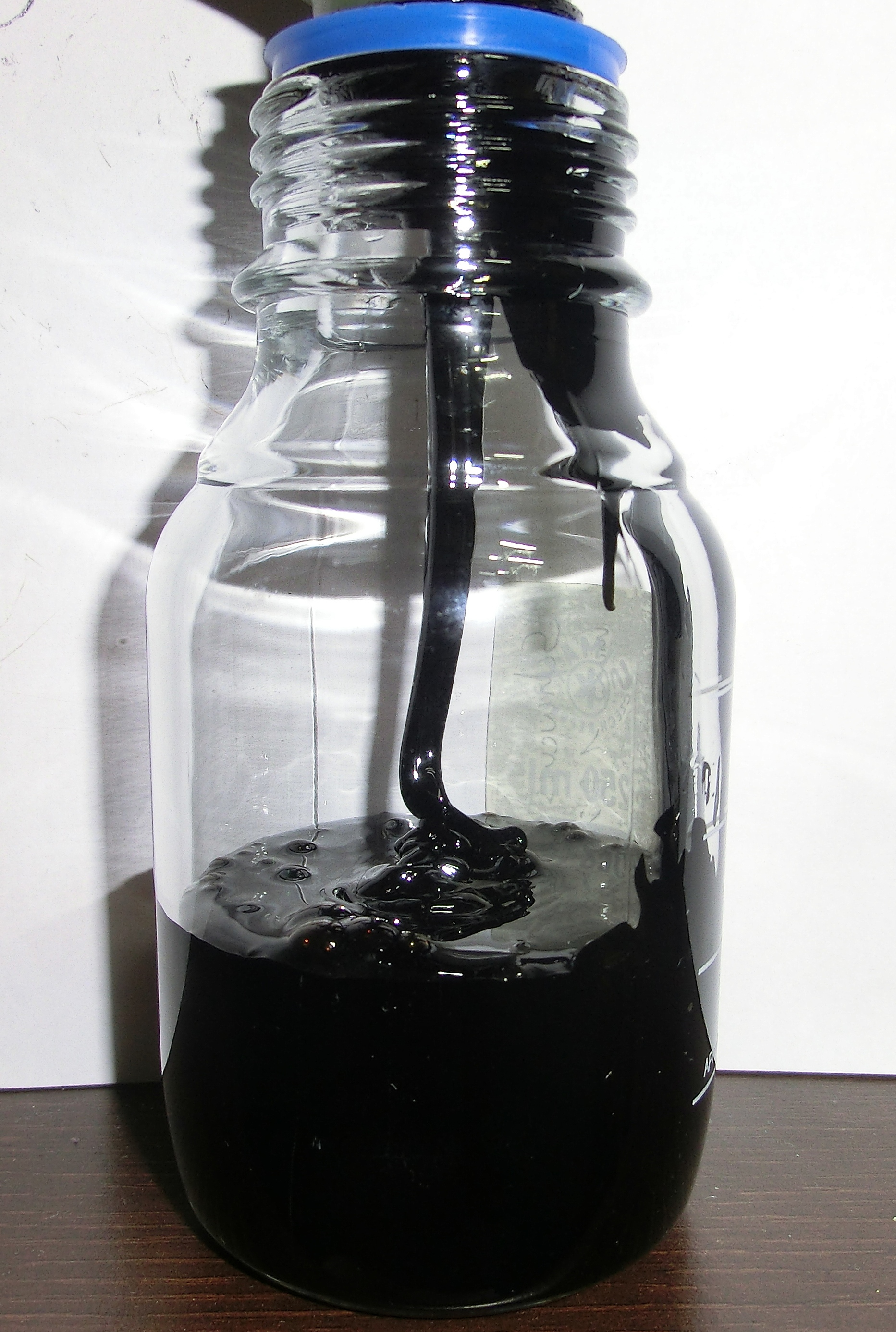
Tar-like consistency of heavy fuel oil

Heavy fuel oil (HFO) is a fuel oil of a tar-like consistency. Also known as bunker fuel or residual fuel oil, HFO is the residual mixture left over from the distillation and cracking of crude oil in oil refineries. Generally, it has a boiling temperature between 350 and 500 °C and is significantly more viscous than diesel fuel. As it is created through the extraction of more valuable components of its petroleum precursor, HFO contains various undesirable compounds and elements, which include aromatics, sulfur, nitrogen, vanadium, and others. These non-hydrocarbon contaminants significantly increase toxic gas and particulate emissions upon combustion, such as sulfur dioxide, carbon monoxide, and nitrogen oxides.

It is predominantly used for marine vessel propulsion in marine diesel engines because it is cheaper than cleaner fuel sources such as diesel fuel or distillates. The emission-heavy nature of the fuel also contributes to this method of usage; marine vessels, such as oil tankers and cruise ships, are generally distant from population centers, sailing in open seas and oceans for the majority of the time, minimizing the exposure of humans to harmful aerosols and gaseous emissions. Ships utilizing heavy fuel oil may switch to cleaner alternatives such as diesel when approaching land. The use and carrying of HFO in seafaring vessels presents several environmental concerns, such as accidental oil spills due to adverse weather or routine handling.

After the International Maritime Organization (IMO) implemented a global sulfur emissions cap in 2020, a growing number of ships have been equipped with scrubbers, which allow ships to continue using high-sulfur heavy fuel oil while meeting air quality regulations, shifting the environmental burden from air to water.

HFOs are banned as fuel for ships travelling in the Antarctic as part of the IMO's International Code for Ships Operating in Polar Waters (the Polar Code). For similar reasons, an HFO ban in Arctic waters came into force in 2024.

== Heavy fuel oil characteristics ==
HFO consists of the remnants, or residual, of petroleum once the hydrocarbons of higher quality are extracted via processes such as thermal and catalytic cracking. Thus, HFO is also commonly referred to as residual fuel oil. The chemical composition of HFO is highly variable due to the fact that HFO is often mixed or blended with cleaner fuels; blending streams can include carbon numbers from C_{20} to greater than C_{50}. HFOs are blended to achieve certain viscosity and flow characteristics for a given use. As a result of the wide compositional spectrum, HFO is defined by processing, physical and final-use characteristics. Being the final remnant of the cracking process, HFO also contains mixtures of the following compounds to various degrees: paraffins, cycloparaffins, aromatics, olefins, and asphaltenes as well as molecules containing sulfur, oxygen, nitrogen or organometals. HFO is characterized by a maximum density of 1010 kg/m^{3} at 15 °C, and a maximum viscosity of 700 mm^{2}/s (cSt) at 50 °C according to ISO 8217.

=== Combustion and atmospheric reactions ===
Given HFO's elevated sulfur contamination (maximum of 5% by mass), the combustion reaction results in the formation of sulfur dioxide (SO_{2}).

== Heavy fuel oil use and shipping ==
Since the middle of the 20th century, HFO has been used primarily by the shipping industry due to its low cost compared with all other fuel oils, being up to 30% less expensive, as well as the historically lax regulatory requirements for emissions of nitrogen oxides (NO_{x}) and sulfur dioxide (SO_{2}) by the IMO. For these two reasons, HFO is the single most widely used engine fuel oil on-board ships. Data available until 2007 for global consumption of HFO at the international marine sector reports total fuel oil usages of 200 million tonnes, with HFO consumption accounting for 174 million tonnes. Data available until 2011 for fuel oil sales to the international marine shipping sector reports 207.5 million tonnes total fuel oil sales with HFO accounting for 177.9 million tonnes.

Marine vessels with combustion engines can use a variety of different fuels for the purpose of propulsion, which are divided into two broad categories: residual oils or distillates. In contrast to HFOs, distillates are the petroleum products created through refining crude oil and include diesel, kerosene, naphtha and gas. Residual oils are often combined to various degrees with distillates to achieve desired properties for operational and/or environmental performance. Table 1 lists commonly used categories of marine fuel oil and mixtures; all mixtures including the low sulfur marine fuel oil are still considered HFO.

Table 1: Types of marine HFO and composition
Category of marine HFO	Marine HFO composition
Bunker C/Fuel oil No. 6	Residual oil
Intermediate fuel oil (IFO) 380	Distillate combined with 98% residual oil
Intermediate fuel oil (IFO) 180	Distillate combined with 88% residual oil
Low-sulfur marine fuel oils (HFO derivative)	Distillate–residual-oil blend (higher ratio of distillate)

== Arctic environmental concerns ==
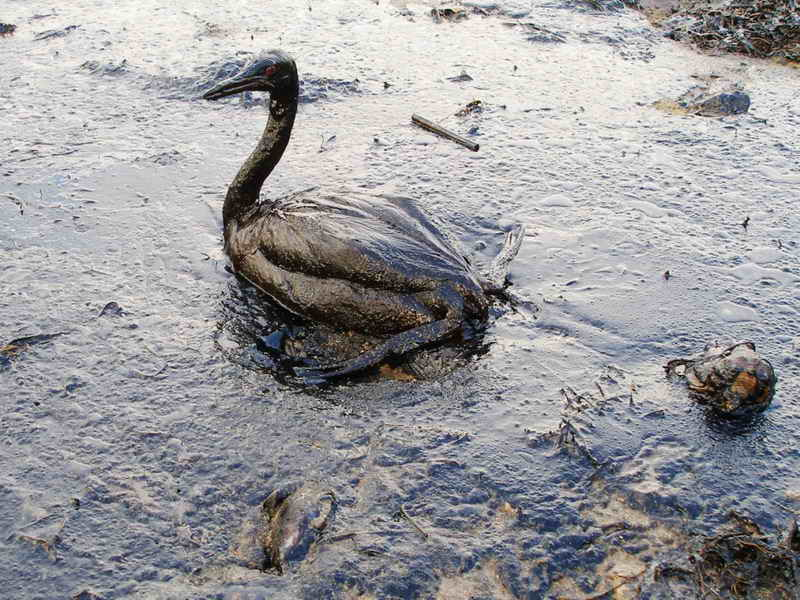
Wildlife suffering from a tanker oil spill. Tar-like HFO coats and persistently sticks to feathers.

The use and carriage of HFO in the Arctic is a commonplace marine industry practice. In 2015, over 200 ships entered Arctic waters carrying a total of 1.1 million tonnes of fuel with 57% of fuel consumed during Arctic voyages being HFO. In the same year, trends in carriage of HFO were reported to be 830,000 tonnes, representing a significant growth from the reported 400,000 tonnes in 2012. A report in 2017 by Norwegian Type Approval body DNV GL (Det Norske Veritas) calculated the total fuel use of HFO by mass in the Arctic to be over 75% with larger vessels being the main consumers.

In the light of increased area traffic, and given that the Arctic is considered to be a sensitive ecological area with a higher response intensity to climate change, the environmental risks posed by HFO present concern for environmentalists and governments in the area. The two main environmental concerns for HFO in the Arctic are the risk of spill or accidental discharge and the emission of black carbon as a result of HFO consumption.

=== Environmental effects of heavy fuel oil spills ===
Due to its very high viscosity and elevated density, HFO released into the environment is a greater threat to flora and fauna compared to distillate or other residual fuels. In 2009, the Arctic Council identified the spill of oil in the Arctic as the greatest threat to the local marine environment. Being the remnant of the distillation and cracking processes, HFO is characterized by an elevated overall toxicity compared to all other fuels. Its viscosity prevents breakdown into the environment, a property exacerbated by the cold temperatures in the Arctic resulting in the formation of tar-lumps, and an increase in volume through emulsification. Its density, tendency to persist and emulsify can result in HFO polluting both the water column and seabed.

Table 2: Characteristics and effects of marine HFO spills
Category of marine HFO	Immediate effects of spills	Environmental effects	Cleanup characteristics
Bunker C / fuel oil No. 6	May emulsify, form into tar balls, remain buoyant or sink to the seabed	Tar-like consistency of HFO sticks to feathers and fur, with short- and long-term effects on marine flora and fauna (benthic, intertidal and shoreline species).	Water recovery of spill is limited; cleanup consists mainly of shoreline and oiled substrate remediation.
Intermediate fuel oil (IFO) 380	Emulsifies up to triple the original spill volume, may sink to seabed or remain buoyant.	Tar-like consistency of HFO sticks to feathers and fur, with short- and long-term effects on marine flora and fauna (benthic, intertidal and shoreline species).	Skimmers are used to recover on-water spill until the oil emulsifies, making its removal more difficult. Once coating a surface, the oil is difficult to remove from substrate and sediment.
Intermediate fuel oil (IFO) 180	Emulsifies up to triple the original spill volume, may sink to seabed or remain buoyant.	Tar-like consistency of HFO sticks to feathers and fur, with short- and long-term effects on marine flora and fauna (benthic, intertidal and shoreline species).	Skimmers are used to recover on-water spill until the oil emulsifies, making its removal more difficult. Once coating a surface, the oil is difficult to remove from substrate and sediment.
Low-sulfur marine fuel oils (HFO-derived)	No ground data to determine immediate effects of spills. Laboratory tests suggest behaviors regarding environmental persistence and emulsification similar to those of other HFO mixtures.	Limited information. Likely to have effects similar to those of IFO with increased initial toxicity due to the larger distillate fraction causing immediate dispersal and evaporation.	Limited information. Likely to have effects similar to those of other HFO mixtures.

==== History of major HFO spills from 2000 onward ====
For a more complete list, see List of oil spills.

The following HFO specific spills have occurred since the year 2000. The information is organized according to year and ship name and includes amount released and the spill location:

Date	Link/Reference	Vessel	Flag/State	Location	Tonnes	Notes
2000		Janra	Germany	Sea of Åland	40	
2001		Baltic Carrier	Marshall Islands	Baltic Sea	2350	
2002	Prestige oil spill	MV Prestige	Athens, Greece	Spain, Atlantic Ocean	60000	
2003		Fu Shan Hai	China	Baltic Sea	1680	
2004		Selendang Ayu	Malaysia	Unalaska Island - near Arctic	1300	
2007	Cosco Busan oil spill	Cosco Busan	Germany	San Francisco Bay	191	IFO 380
2009	Full City oil spill	Full City	Panama	Langesund, Norway	200	
2011-02-17		Godafoss	Iceland	Hvaler Islands, Norway	125	
2011		Golden Trader	Panama	Skagerrak, Denmark	205	IFO 180

=== Environmental impacts of heavy fuel oil use ===
The combustion of HFO in ship engines results in the highest amount of black carbon emissions compared to all other fuels. The choice of marine fuel is the most important determinant of ship engine emission factors for black carbon. The second most important factor in the emission of black carbon is the ship load size, with emission factors of black carbon increasing up to six times given low engine loads. Black carbon is the product of incomplete combustion and a component of soot and fine particulate matter (<2.5 μg). It has a short atmospheric lifetime of a few days to a week and is typically removed upon precipitation events. Although there has been debate concerning the radiative forcing of black carbon, combinations of ground and satellite observations suggest a global solar absorption of 0.9W·m^{−2}, making it the second most important climate forcer after CO_{2.} Black carbon affects the climate system by: decreasing the snow/ice albedo through dark soot deposits and increasing snowmelt timing, reducing the planetary albedo through absorption of solar radiation reflected by the cloud systems, earth surface and atmosphere, as well as directly decreasing cloud albedo with black carbon contamination of water and ice found therein. The greatest increase in Arctic surface temperature per unit of black carbon emissions results from the decrease in snow/ice albedo which makes Arctic specific black carbon release more detrimental than emissions elsewhere. To mitigate the atmospheric emissions, many vessels have installed exhaust gas cleaning systems, known as scrubbers. While scrubbers reduce air pollution, especially the predominant open-loop scrubbers discharge large volumes of acidic, contaminated washwater containing heavy metals and harmful organic compounds directly into the sea, raising concerns about significant marine pollution and ecological damage.

== IMO and the Polar Code ==
The International Maritime Organization (IMO), a specialized arm of the United Nations, adopted into force on 1 January 2017 the International Code for Ships Operating in Polar Waters or Polar Code. The requirements of the Polar Code are mandatory under both the International Convention for the Prevention of Pollution from Ships (MARPOL) and the International Convention for the Safety of Life at Sea (SOLAS). The two broad categories covered by the Polar Code include safety and pollution prevention related to navigation in both Arctic and Antarctic polar waters.

The carriage and use of HFO in the Arctic is discouraged by the Polar Code while being banned completely from the Antarctic under MARPOL Annex I regulation 43. The ban of HFO use and carriage in the Antarctic precedes the adoption of the Polar Code. At its 60th session (26 March 2010), The Marine Environmental Protection Committee (MEPC) adopted Resolution 189(60) which went into effect in 2011 and prohibits fuels of the following characteristics:

1. crude oils having a density at 15°C higher than 900 kg/m^{3};
2. oils, other than crude oils, having a density at 15°C higher than 900 kg/m^{3} or a kinematic viscosity at 50°C higher than 180 mm^{2}/s; or
3. bitumen, tar and their emulsions.

IMO's Marine Environmental Protection Committee (MEPC) tasked the Pollution Prevention Response Sub-Committee (PPR) to enact a ban on the use and carriage of heavy fuel in Arctic waters at its 72nd and 73rd sessions. This task is also accompanied by a requirement to properly define HFO taking into account its current definition under MARPOL Annex I regulation 43. The adoption of the ban is anticipated for 2021, with widespread implementation by 2023.

=== Resistance to heavy fuel oil phase-out ===
The Clean Arctic Alliance was the first IMO delegate nonprofit organization to campaign against the use of HFO in Arctic waters. However, the phase-out and ban of HFO in the Arctic was formally proposed to MEPC by eight countries in 2018: Finland, Germany, Iceland, the Netherlands, New Zealand, Norway, Sweden and the United States. Although these member states continue to support the initiative, several countries have been vocal about their resistance to an HFO ban on such a short time scale. The Russian Federation has expressed concern for impacts to the maritime shipping industry and trade given the relatively low cost of HFO. Russia instead suggested the development and implementation of mitigation measures for the use and carriage of HFO in Arctic waters. Canada and Marshall Islands have presented similar arguments, highlighting the potential impacts on Arctic communities (namely remote indigenous populations) and economies.

To appease concerns and resistance, at its 6th session in February 2019, the PPR sub-committee working group developed a "draft methodology for analyzing impacts" of HFO to be finalized at PPR's 7th session in 2020. The purpose of the methodology being to evaluate the ban according to its economic and social impacts on Arctic indigenous communities and other local communities, to measure anticipated benefits to local ecosystems, and potentially consider other factors that could be positively or negatively affected by the ban.

== See also ==
- Mazut
