= Altos de Pemehue National Reserve =

- IUCN category IV (habitat/species management area)
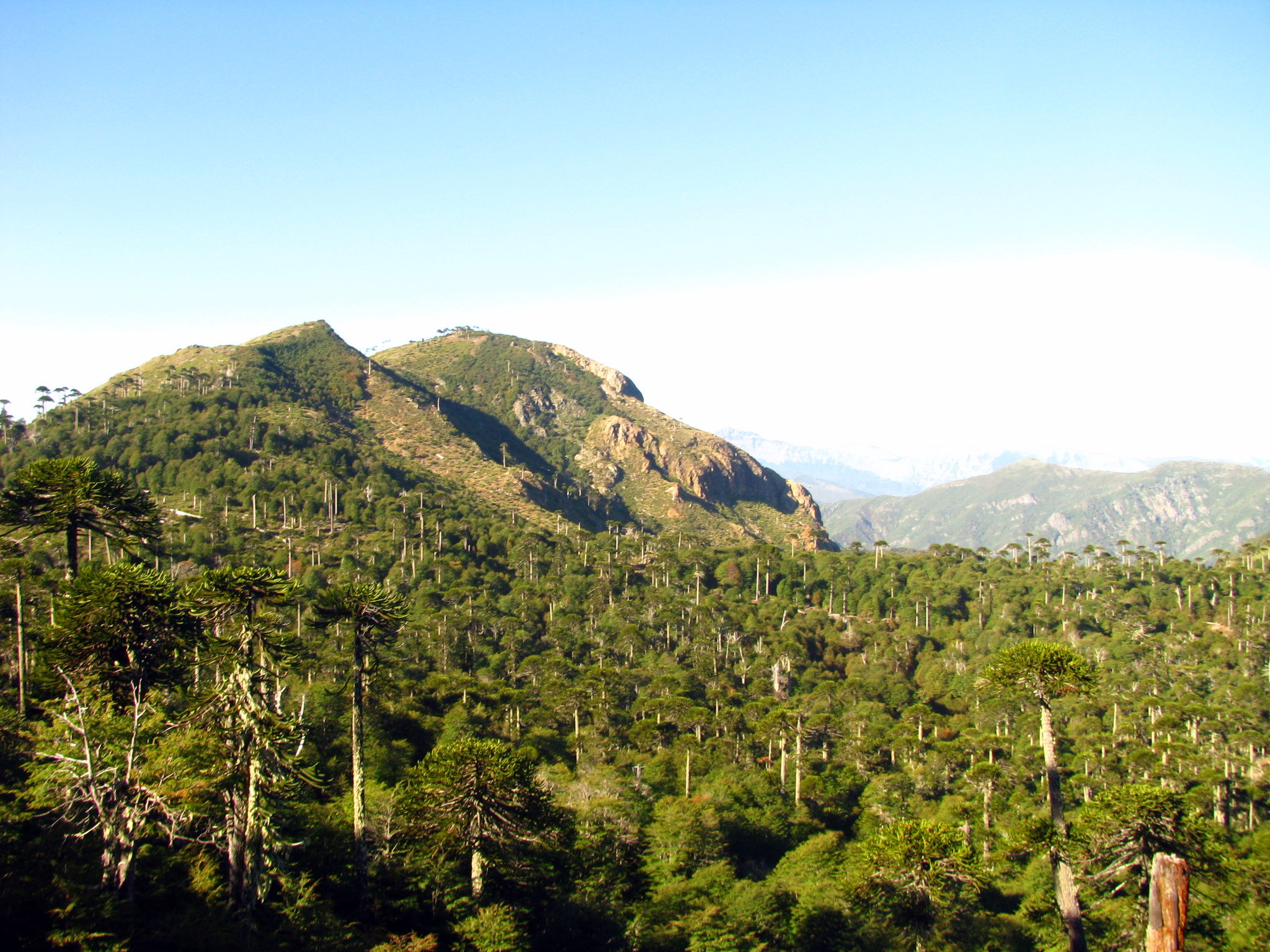
- Interactive map of Altos de Pemehue National Reserve
- Location: Biobío Region, Chile
- Coordinates: 37.98°S 71.65°W
- Area: 188.56 km^{2} (72.80 sq mi)
- Designation: National reserve
- Authorized: 2009
- Administrator: Corporación Nacional Forestal (CONAF)

Altos de Pemehue National Reserve is a protected area in Biobío Region of Chile. It covers an area of 188.56 km^{2} in the Andes.
