= Crissy Marsh =

Coordinates: 37.8046°N 122.4566°W

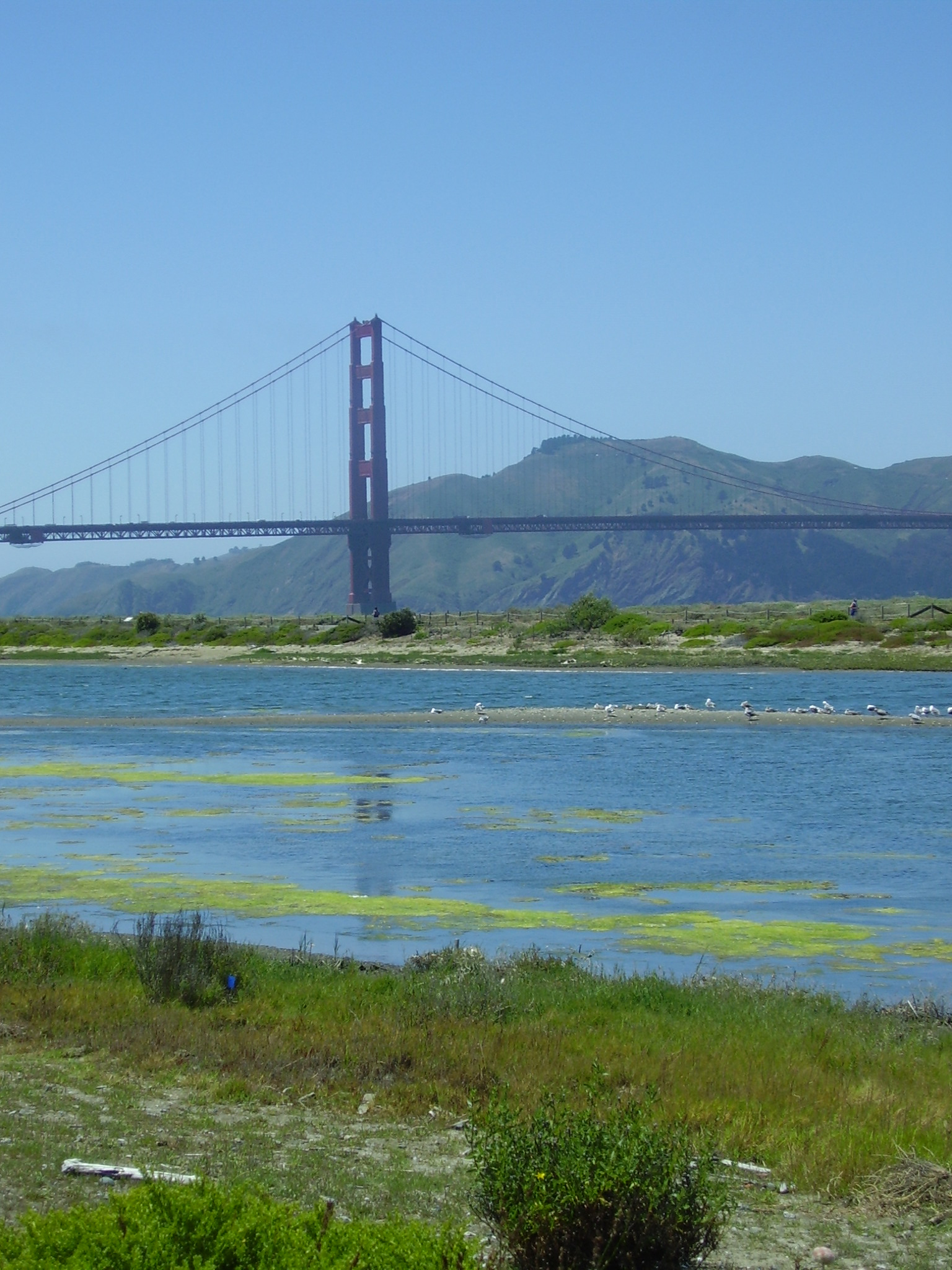
View of the Golden Gate Bridge from Crissy Field.

Crissy Marsh is a wetland area in San Francisco, California, United States. Crissy Marsh has brackish waters, making an ideal habitat for many bird species along the Pacific Flyway. Here, freshwater runoff meets the salt water of the bay. It is 130-acres and located on the northern end of the San Francisco Peninsula. This salt marsh was largely destroyed to build Crissy Field, an airfield used during World War I and World War II. It has since been restored, with the airfield being removed. It now hosts abundant and recovering wildlife on the northern San Francisco coast.

== History ==
The Ohlone, a Native American people, used this area to harvest food from the bay in the late 18th century. The name Presidio originated when the Spanish arrived in 1776 and called the area “El Presidio”. In 1846, the U.S. Army took control of the area and used it for dumping of hazardous materials and then later transformed it into an aviation airfield. Crissy Marsh was used as military land throughout World War I and World War II. This former U.S. Army airfield was named in honor of the Presidio Army artilleryman, Major Dana Crissy. In 1997 the cleanup of the hazardous waste began and restoration took place between 1998 and 2000.

== Restoration Project ==
The San Francisco Bay has lost more than 90% of its wetland acreage since the mid-1800s due to land modifications such as shoreline expansion and development, which has led to the decline in coastal habitat, connectivity, species diversity, and water quality. In 1994, vision of the restoration plan of Crissy Field began under the Presidio General Management Plan (GMPA). The goals of the restoration project were to restore the area to a sustainable tidal wetland as a habitat for plants and wildlife increase the recreational opportunities for residents and visitors to the Presidio. The restoration of Crissy Marsh began in 1997. Since then, almost 90,000 tons of hazardous materials had been removed from the area. Between 1997 and 2000, 40 acres of natural habitat has been restored. This included 18 acres of tidal marsh and 22 acres of dune and dune swale habitat. The expected amount of hazardous waste to be removed was 15,000 tons. After the removal of the waste was completed, it was actually 87,000 tons of hazardous materials that was removed.

Through this restoration project, there were about 100,000 native plants representing 73 native species planted or seeded. The project involved the planting of 104 Cypress trees, the removal of 230,000 cubic yards of soils, 15,000 tons of rubble removed, 130,000 plugs of salt grass grown, and 1 1/3 miles of shoreline promenade created. Additionally, there was 70 acres of asphalt and concrete that had been removed and recycled. The Crissy Field Restoration Project is managed by the National Park Service, Golden Gate National Recreation Area (GGNRA) and the Golden Gate National Parks Conservancy (Parks Conservancy). In 2001 the restored Crissy Field reopened.

=== Monitoring Program ===
From the Parks Service and Environmental Protection Agency, a monitoring program was implemented that involved hydrology, geomorphology, water quality, sedimentation, soil, and vegetation monitoring over a five-year period. Since November 1999, the hydrologic and morphological monitoring in the Crissy Marsh was conducted by the hydrology firm of Philip Williams and Associates, Ltd. (PWA). They monitored water level measurements, beach profile surveys, cross section surveys, marsh elevation transects, detailed 13 topographic surveys of the ebb and flood shoals, bathymetric surveys, and digital terrain modeling. They found that the greatest morphological change was observed in the first 18 months following the restoration. To monitor water quality, a continuous logger was installed underneath the footbridge in May 2001, and it has been constantly recording water temperature, dissolved oxygen (DO), and salinity every 30 minutes. The monitoring of sedimentation has been conducted by Dr. John Callaway of the University of San Francisco (USF) with the use of Sedimentation Erosion Tables (SETs) and feldspar marker horizons that were established in August 2000. Every year since 2000, the vegetation has been monitored in both the dunes and the marsh.

=== Plants and Wildlife ===
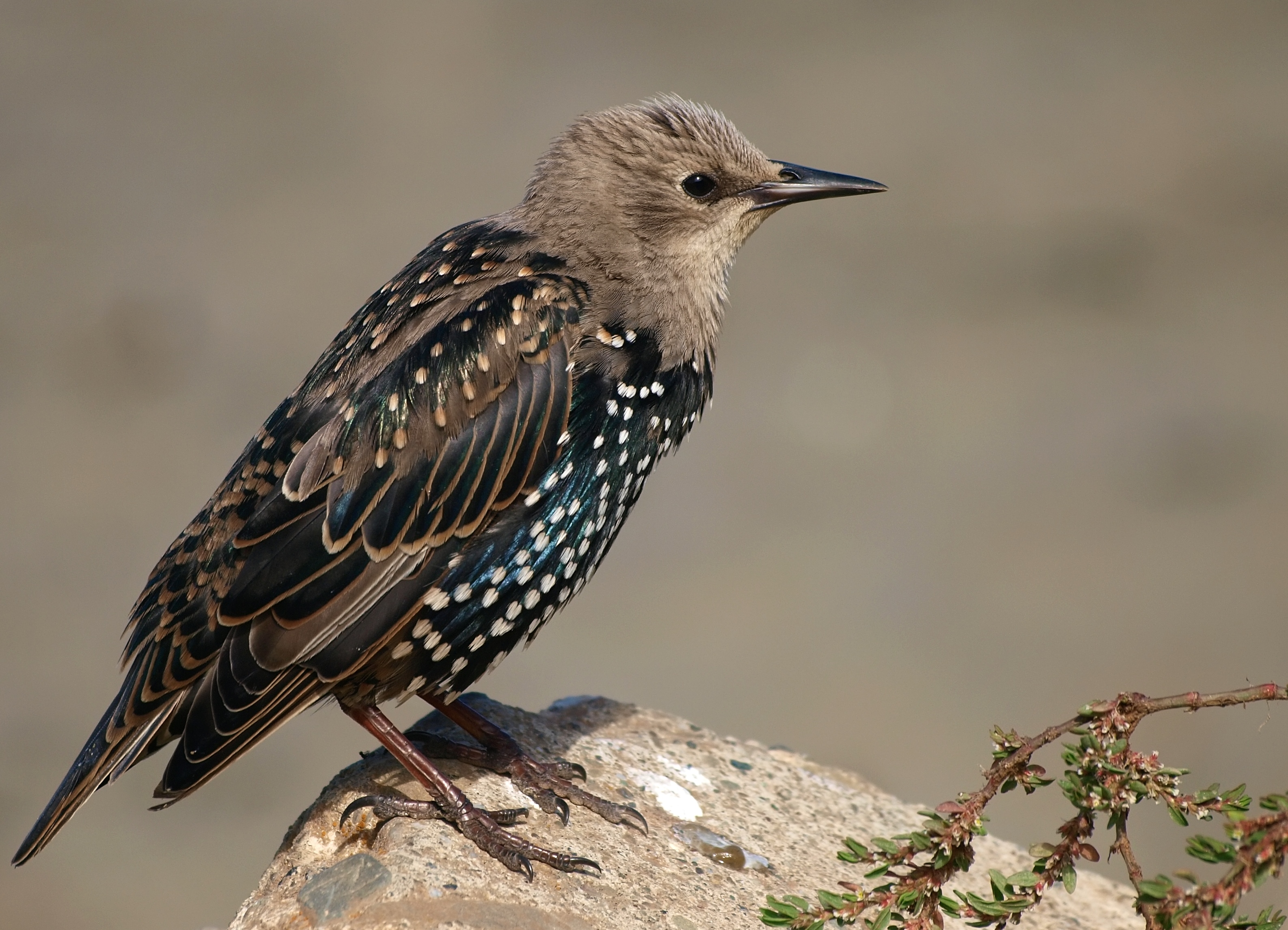
A picture of a starling (Sturnus vulgaris) at Crissy Field.

The restored salt marshes and dunes of the Presidio has become a sustainable habitat for a diverse array of flora and fauna. A major challenge the restoration projects have faced is the abundance of invasive species. There are various invasive plant species in the area that are outcompeting the native plant species. The Presidio is home to over 200 different bird species. Crissy Marsh now attracts many bird watchers that come view the diverse array of bird species. There are also as many as 35 endangered, rare, and threatened species in the area as well including the California Red Legged Frog, the Mission Blue Butterfly, and the San Francisco Garter Snake.
