= Hanjin Venezia =

Scrapped container ship notable for causing a San Francisco Bay oil spill in 2007

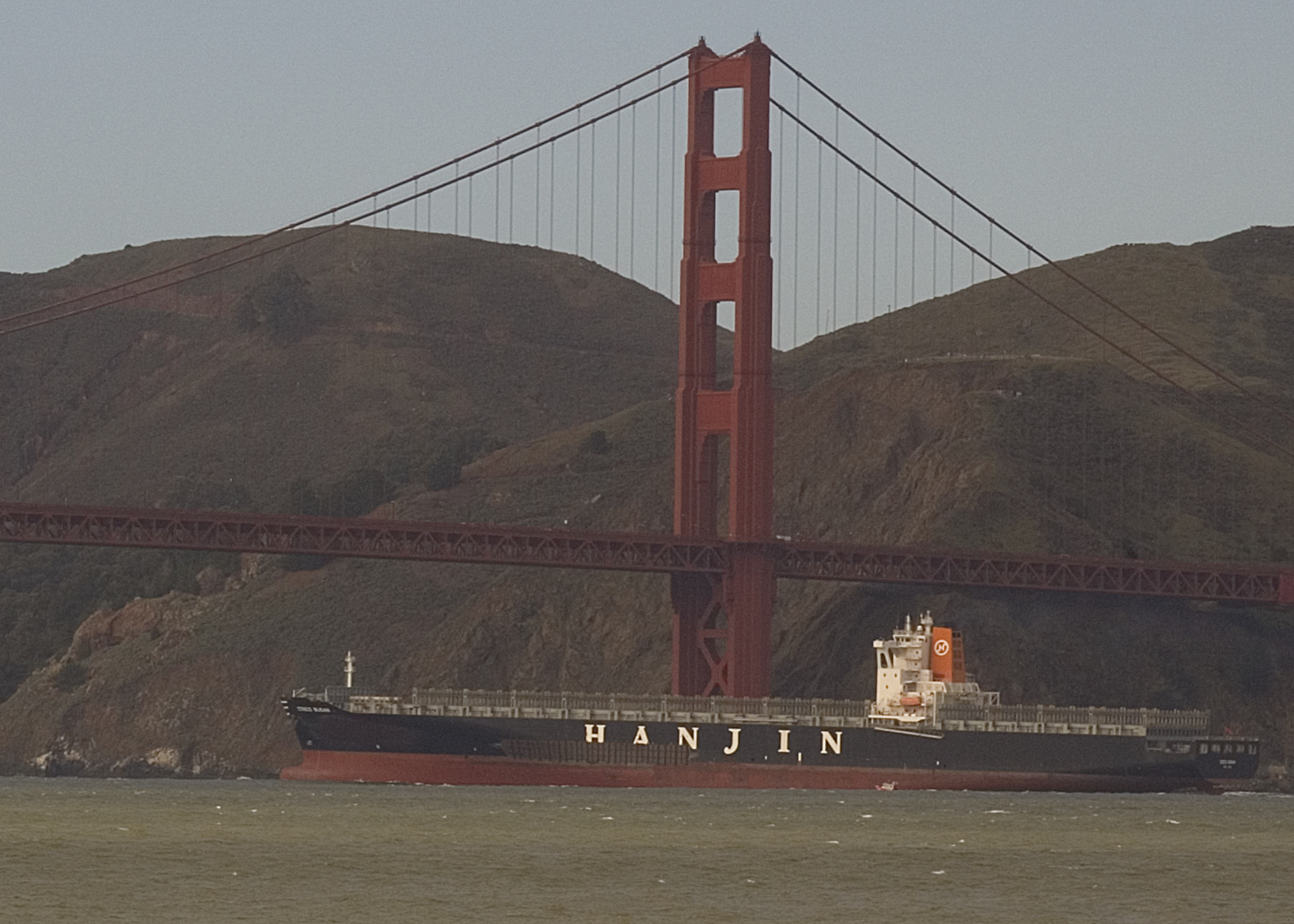
- The then-named Cosco Busan, pictured in December 2007, with repairs of the damaged hull from the Bay Bridge collision visible.

History
- Name: (Hong Kong) Venezia; (Hong Kong) Hanjin Venezia (2010); (Hong Kong) MSC Venezia (2008); (Hong Kong) Hanjin Venezia (2008); (Germany) Cosco Busan (2006); (Marshall Islands) (Germany) Hanjin Cairo (2001)
- Owner: Regal Stone Ltd.
- Operator: Synergy Management Ltd.
- Builder: Hyundai Heavy Industries Co., Ltd.; Ulsan, South Korea
- Yard number: 1381
- Launched: 20 September 2001
- Completed: December 2001
- Identification: Call sign: VRDI6; CGMIX ID: 512403; IMO number: 9231743; MMSI no.: 477968900
- Fate: January 2017 scrapped in Chittagong

General characteristics
- Tonnage: 68,086 DWT; 65,131 GT
- Length: 265 m (869 ft)
- Beam: 40 m (130 ft)
- Draught: 14 m (46 ft)
- Speed: 25.9 kn (48.0 km/h; 29.8 mph)
- Capacity: 5,551 TEU

Hanjin Venezia, formerly named the Cosco Busan, was a 275 m (902 ft) container ship. On 7 November 2007, it collided with the protective fender of the Delta Tower of the San Francisco–Oakland Bay Bridge in heavy fog. The collision sliced open two of its fuel tanks and led to the Cosco Busan oil spill in San Francisco Bay. She was renamed the Hanjin Venezia after the accident.

The vessel was initially built in 2001 by Hyundai Heavy Industries at Ulsan, South Korea. In December 2001, the vessel was placed under long-term charter to Hanjin Shipping Co., Ltd. of Seoul, South Korea and named Hanjin Cairo. The vessel called on various ports of Europe, Asia, and along the West Coast of the United States, specifically the Ports of Long Beach and Oakland, California.

In November 2006, the ship's owners renamed the vessel from the Hanjin Cairo to the Cosco Busan. After a 3-year absence from U.S. ports, the Cosco Busan called upon the Port of Long Beach on December 29, 2006. On October 24, 2007, the vessel was sold to Regal Stone Ltd. of Hong Kong and was re-flagged and sailed under the national flag of Hong Kong. The Cosco Busan's new owners contracted with Fleet Management to supply an all-Chinese crew and to manage her technical operations on behalf of the owners. Despite named after Cosco, Cosco claimed that the ship has no relation to the company.

Through the changes in flag, ownership, and managing operator, the vessel has remained under charter to Hanjin Shipping Company. In January 2017, it was sold for scrap.

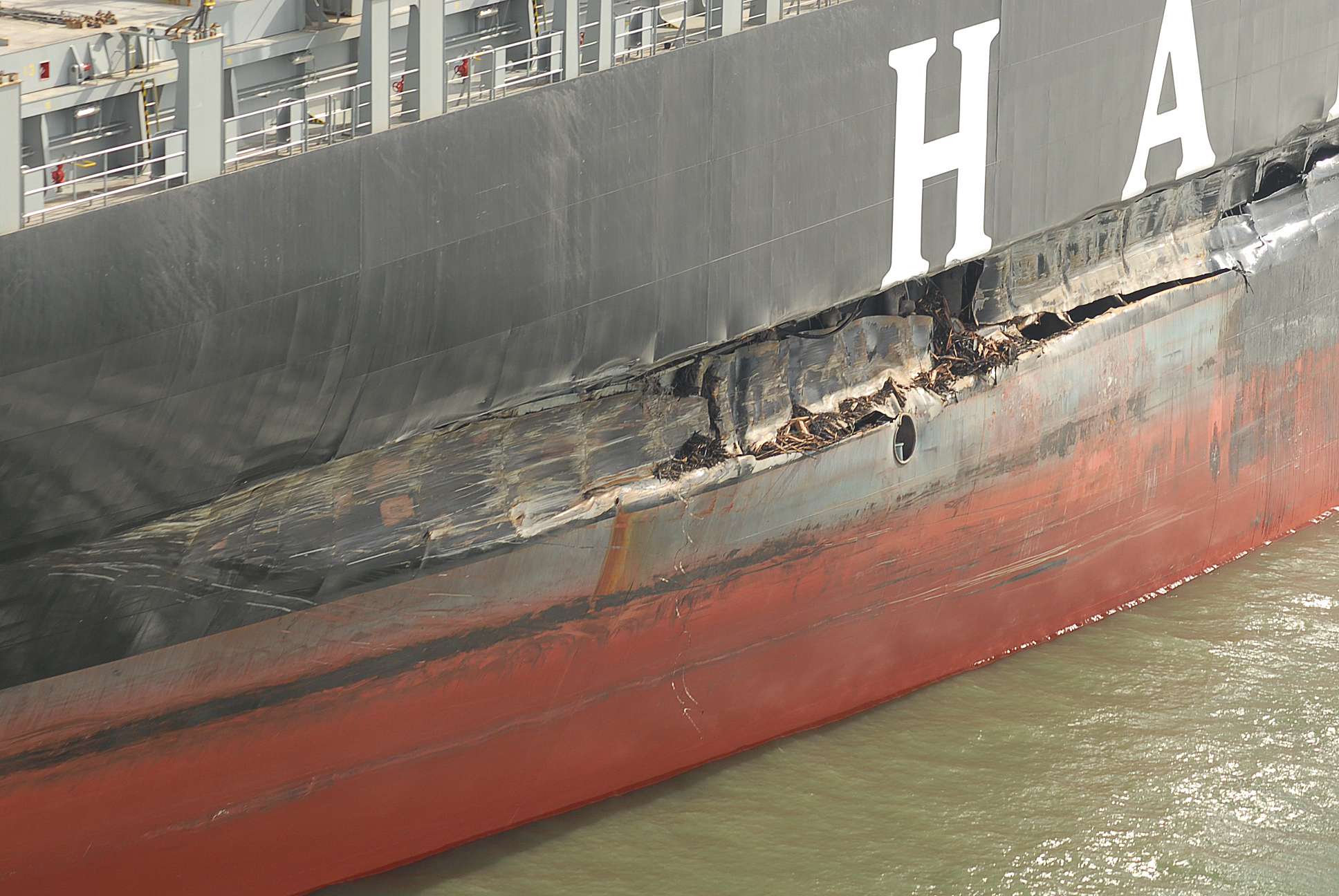

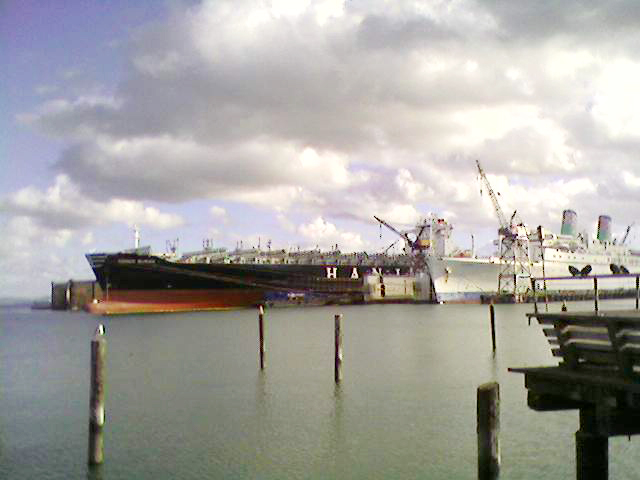
