= 1971 San Francisco Bay oil spill =

Oil tanker collision spill

Coordinates: 37°45′34″N 122°20′31″W

The 1971 San Francisco Bay oil spill occurred when two Standard Oil Company of California tankers, the Arizona Standard and the Oregon Standard, collided on January 18, 1971, in the San Francisco Bay. The resulting 800,000-gallon spill, the largest in Bay Area history, threatened sensitive natural habitats both inside and outside the bay, including the Bolinas Lagoon, and contributed to the growth of activism against pollution, after thousands of Bay Area residents volunteered to clean up beaches and rescue oil-soaked birds. Several environmental organizations had their origins in the spill cleanup. Standard Oil spent more than $1 million on the clean-up.

== Inception of International Bird Rescue and volunteerism ==
In March 1971, California's Fish and Game Department estimated that 7,000 birds were oiled during the incident, most of which died before collection or while being taken care of. At the end of January 1971, roughly 200 of the 1,600 birds "brought in" were still alive. Ultimately less than 80 of those survived.

The resulting environmental destruction from the spill, specifically the avian population, prompted volunteers to rescue some 4,300 birds. At the time, knowledge on how to care for oiled birds was low. Despite best efforts, only 300 or so animals were deemed fit to be released. The remnants of this volunteer force eventually resulted in the creation of the International Bird Rescue to increase knowledge and research in bird rescue. One of the largest volunteer turnouts since the 1906 San Francisco earthquake came of this event.

== See also ==
- Cosco Busan oil spill
- List of oil spills
- John Francis, an environmentalist whose career began with the spill
