= Fleet Management Limited =

Ship management company

- Industry: Ship Management
- Founded: 1994
- Headquarters: Hong Kong
- Area served: Worldwide
- Key people: Harindarpal Banga (Chairmman and CEO)
- Parent: The Caravel Group Limited
- Website: http://www.fleetship.com/

Fleet Management Limited, established in 1994, provides ship management services like technical management, ship building, marine insurance, maritime training and crew management to ship owners worldwide. They have their headquarters in Hong Kong, one of the biggest hubs for shipping operations.

The company manages and looks after cargo vessels, multipurpose vessels, cellular container vessels, different type of bulk carriers, reefer vessels, chemical tankers, gas carriers, product tankers, crude oil, roll-on/roll-off vessels, and pure car carriers.

The company is accredited ISO 9001, ISO 14001, OHSAS 18001 and ISM code compliance certificates from DNV.

Currently Fleet Management Limited has 7000 offshore employees and over 600 onshore staff..

They have established their technical management offices in Hong Kong, India (Mumbai), United Kingdom (London), Singapore and Cyprus. Their crew manning office is primarily located in India, Philippines (Manila) and China (Dalian). In India they have crew manning offices at places like Mumbai, Delhi, Kochi, Kolkata, Chennai, Vizag, Patna, Lucknow and Chandigarh.

During this tenure, Fleet Management Limited has won awards like Best Foreign Employer of 'the Indian Seafarer Award by National Maritime Day Celebrations on 5 April 2012', Green Awareness Award 2012, Excellence Award and 'Recruit – Most Innovative Award' by Hong Kong Management Association Awards for Fleet's SafeR+ program, "Best Performing Ship Management Company in Port State Control Inspection" by Pi Xiu Management Award 2011 and many more.

On 7th October 2024, Fleet Management has appointed Captain Rajalingam Subramaniam, the former president and group CEO of MISC, as its new CEO effective October 21, succeeding founder Kishore Rajvanshy, who will transition to a senior advisory role.

== Fleet Management Training Institute ==
The Fleet Management Training Institute (FMTI) was established in 1997 by Fleet Management Limited. It is located at Nerul, India. It provides various marine courses such as Bridge Team Management, Engine Room Simulator for Marine Engineering (at Management Level), Engine Room Simulator for Marine Engineering (at Operational Level), ISPS Familiarization, Ship Manoeuvring Simulator and others.

== FMLWorld ==
FML World Logo

Fleet Management Limited launched a personalized website for seafarers, shore staff and their family members around the globe. The website is known as FMLWorld. This project has become one of the significant elements of the company. The website provides assorted information on events, seminars, training institute, job opportunities and additionally various facilities such as ship tracking. Participants can contribute content in the form of their poems, artwork, photographs, sketches and others.

== See also ==
- List of freight ship companies at Hong Kong
