= Shicuo =

Village in Fujian, China

Shicuo (Chinese: 施厝村; pinyin: Shīcuò Cūn; Pe̍h-ōe-jī: Sì-chhù-chhoan) is a village in the Quangang District of Fujian's Quanzhou Municipal Region. It is administered under Nanpu Town.

== Shicuo in the News ==
The village neighbours the Fujian Refining and Petrochemical Company (FJRPCo) plant, a joint venture of Sinopec and the Fujian provincial government on the one hand, and ExxonMobil and Saudi Aramco at 2% each. By design it refines 4-12 million tons of oil a year.

Thousands of Shicuo villagers are poised to move away and settle in Tuling Town, whose centre is more than 10 kilometres (6.2 mi) away. Their move pends approval by the Quangang district government.

Shicuo is about 15 kilometres (9.3 mi) away from Chengping Village, the centre of the August 31 Fengwei mass incident. In the weeks following, reporters initially drawn to Fengwei Town fanned out over Quanggang District. Residents of Shicuo spoke to a Hong Kong reporter; two of them were quoted translated in an English newspaper published Sept 14.

A Ms. Zheng, in her 50s, said of FJRPCo:

- "The stench emitted by the nearby `integrated chemical plant' is so vigorous all day long that I can't get rid of it, even though I tightly shut the door and all the windows in my home. With regard to the unpleasant smell, we don't know where to lodge our complaints. We have no way out."
- The noise made by the plant is so loud that she and other villagers frequently could not hear one another talk.

A Mr. Shi (施) Bixiang, 46, said:

- "The flames, sometimes as high as 20 metres ... were so bright that there was no need for my family to switch on any lighting in the evening for months. Just like many of my fellow villagers, I moved my bed in an effort to hide myself away from the light pollution, or I would never be able to sleep."
- The flames also radiate an unbearable amount of heat. During even the hot summers, he has never felt that hot before. "(Since the plant opened) I found myself unable to cool down at home, even when I turned on two electric fans in full swing".
- One elderly villager has reached his tolerance level with the "highly disturbing noise and smashed almost everything in his home".
- Mr. Shi called the provincial environmental protection hotline in June. "The guy at the other end asked whether I was calling from Quangang district as soon as he picked up the phone. He said that he had already received a large number of complaints about the oil refinery since it began operating in May." The man told him that nothing could be done at that level, as the plant was one of the leading chemical enterprises in the nation. (Approved by State Council in 2007)
