= List of environmental disasters =

Cataloging of environmental disasters

This article is a list of environmental disasters. In this context it is an annotated list of specific events caused by human activity that results in a negative effect on the environment.

== Environmental disasters by category ==
=== Agricultural ===
- Africanized bees, known colloquially as "killer bees"
- Mismanagement and shrinking of the Aral Sea
- Drying up of the Colorado River Delta due to extensive diversion of the Colorado River, mainly for agriculture
- "Dirty dairying" in New Zealand
- Dust Bowl in central United States (1930s)
- Great sparrow campaign; sparrows were eliminated from Chinese farms, which caused locusts to swarm the farms and contributed to a famine which killed 38 million people.
- Gulf of Mexico dead zone
- Salinity in Australia
- Salinization of the Fertile Crescent
- Salton Sea California, U.S.

=== Biodiversity ===
- 2006 Zakouma elephant slaughter
- Chestnut blight
- Indian vulture crisis due to Diclofenac
- Deforestation of Easter Island
- Destruction of the old growth forests
- Devil facial tumour disease
- Dutch Elm Disease
- Emerald Ash Borer
- Environmental threats to the Great Barrier Reef
- Extinction of Australian megafauna
- Four Pests Campaign of China, 1958
- Ghost nets
- Grounding of SS Makambo on Lord Howe Island
- Gulf of Mexico dead zone
- Invasive species in New Zealand
- Introduction of the Nile perch into Lake Victoria in Africa, devastating indigenous fish species
- Introduction of nutria to Louisiana
- Kudzu in the United States
- Loss of Louisiana Wetlands
- Mercury contamination in Grassy Narrows
- Rabbits in Australia
- Red imported fire ants
- Reduction in the number of the American bison
- Shark finning
- The Saemangeum Seawall
- The loss of biodiversity of New Zealand

=== Human health ===
- Agent Orange use by the United States during the Vietnam War, resulting in lasting serious health effects on the Vietnamese population, such as cancer, nervous system disorders, and countless related fatalities
- Cancer Alley
- Goiânia accident, human deaths resulting from dismantling a scrapped medical machine containing a source of radioactivity
- Health effects arising from the September 11 attacks
- Introduction of infectious diseases by Europeans causing the death of indigenous people during European colonization of the Americas
- Introduction of the bubonic plague (the Plague of Justinian) in Europe from Africa in the 7th century resulting in the death of up to 60% (100 million) of the population.
- Introduction of the bubonic plague (the Black Death) in Europe from Central Asia in the 14th century resulting in the death of up to 60% (200 million) of the population and recurring until the 18th century.
- Mercury contamination in Grassy Narrows
- Guadalajara explosions in Mexico, April 1992

=== Industrial ===
- 1912 Itai-itai disease, due to cadmium poisoning in Japan
- 1948 Donora smog
- 1952 The Great Smog in London
- 1962 to 1970 Mercury contamination in Grassy Narrows
- 1970 Ontario Minamata disease in Canada
- 1976 Seveso disaster, chemical plant explosion, caused highest known exposure to 2,3,7,8-tetrachlorodibenzo-p-dioxin (TCDD) in residential populations
- 1983 Times Beach, Missouri the town was completely evacuated due to a dioxin contamination
- 1984 Bhopal disaster (December 3, 1984, India), leak of methyl isocyanate resulted in more than 22,000 deaths.
- 1986 Sandoz chemical spill into the Rhine river
- 1989 Phillips Disasters
- 1990, Release of cyanide, heavy metals and acid into the Alamosa River, Colorado, from the Summitville mine, causing the death of all aquatic life 17 miles downstream.
- 1991, California's largest hazardous chemical spill: A 19,000-gallon (72,000 L) tank railroad car containing the pesticide/herbicide metam sodium derails from a northbound Southern Pacific freight train, tumbling off the bridge over the Sacramento River at the Cantara Loop near Dunsmuir, California, and rupturing on the rocks below, spilling the car's entire load into the river. Virtually every aquatic organism on a 40-mile (64 km) stretch of river was killed.
- 2000 Baia Mare cyanide spill of a gold mine in Romania, January 2000
- 2001 Bellevue hazardous waste fire, Australia, contaminated the Helena River and groundwater used for freshwater by substantial parts of the Perth metropolitan region.
- 2001 AZF Toulouse chemical factory explosion
- 2003 Release of sulfur dioxide at the Al-Mishraq plant in Iraq
- 2005 Jilin chemical plant explosions
- 2007 Release of lead dust into Esperance Harbour
- 2008 Guangxi chemical plant explosions China
- 2008 Kingston Fossil Plant coal fly ash slurry spill
- 2011 Bohai Bay oil spill China
- 2012 Guangxi cadmium spill China, when toxic cadmium contaminated the Guangxi Longjiang river (龙江河) and water supply.
- 2015 Shenzhen landslide China, a landslide of construction waste at Shenzhen.
- 2018 West Footscray warehouse fire, Australia
- 2018 Fujian Quangang Carbon Nine leakage event China
- 2019 Campbellfield factory fire, Australia
- Baogang Tailings Dam China
- Cancer Alley
- Environmental issues with the Three Gorges Dam
- Health issues on the Aamjiwnaang First Nation due to chemical factories
- Love Canal toxic waste site
- Minamata disease (1950s and 1960s) mercury poisoning in Japan
- Kodaikanal mercury poisoning in India
- Release of CFCs resulting in ozone depletion
- Spring Valley, which was used as a chemical weapons testing ground during World War I.
- Sydney Tar Ponds and Coke Ovens sites in the city of Sydney, Nova Scotia, Canada, known as the largest toxic waste site in North America.
- United States Environmental Protection Agency Superfund sites in the United States

==== Mining ====
- Summitville mine in Colorado, from 1870 to 1992
- Iron Mountain Mine in California, from 1879 to 1963
- Argonaut Mine in California, from 1893 to 1942
- Lead & Zinc mining in northeast Oklahoma / southeast Kansas / southwest Missouri, from 1900s to 1960s
- Copper mining in Tasmania, from 1893 to 1994
- Phosphate mining in Nauru, from 1906 to the 1990s
- Phosphate mining in St. Pierre Island from 1906 to 1972
- 1947 Centralia mine disaster, a coal mine in Illinois
- Centralia mine fire, Pennsylvania, burning since 1962
- Mountaintop removal mining in the US since the 1960s
- Aberfan disaster, collapse of a coal mining waste pile in Wales, 1966
- Tui mine, tailings dam from the now abandoned in New Zealand, 1966 to 2013
- Darvaza gas crater in Derweze, Turkmenistan, burning since 1971
- Uranium mining controversy in Kakadu National Park in Australia, 1981 to 2009
- Ok Tedi environmental disaster in Papua New Guinea beginning in 1984
- Omai gold mine tailing dam breach in Guyana, 1995
- Marcopper mining disaster in the Philippines, March 1996
- Doñana disaster, tailings dam breach of the Los Frailes zinc/silver mine in Spain, April 1998
- Aitik mine, tailings dam failure in Sweden, September 2000
- Martin County sludge spill in Kentucky, October 2000
- Magellan Metals mine, lead dust in Australia, 2006
- Upper Big Branch Mine disaster in West Virginia, April 2010
- Padcal tailings spills of August-September 2012
- Talvivaara gypsum pond leak, Finland, 2012
- Obed Mountain coal mine spill in Alberta, Canada, October 2013
- 2015 Gold King Mine waste water spill in Colorado, August 2015
- Mariana dam disaster, Samarco iron ore mine tailings dam failure, Minas Gerais and Espirito Santo to the Atlantic sea. Brazil, November 2015
- Orinoco Mining Arc, Venezuela, February 2016
- Brumadinho dam disaster of an iron ore mine in Brazil, January 2019
- Hpakant jade mine disaster landslide of tailings into waterway in Myanmar, July 2020

==== Oil industry ====
- Lakeview Gusher oil spill in California, 1910 –1911
- Leaded gasoline introduced 1920s; phased out globally by 2012.
- Greenpoint oil spill in Brooklyn, New York, 1940s–1980
- Mississippi River oil spill (1962–1963)
- Torrey Canyon oil spill off the SW coast of the United Kingdom, February 1967
- Lago Agrio oil field spills in Ecuador, since 1972 (possibly the worst of all)
- MV Sea Star and Horta Barbosa tankers collision and oil spill into the Gulf of Oman, December 1972
- Jakob Maersk oil spill off the coast of Portugal, January 1975
- Environmental issues in the Niger Delta relating to the oil industry, 1976–1996
- Arctic Refuge drilling controversy, since 1977
- Amoco Cadiz shipwreck and oil spill off the coast of Brittany, France, March 1978
- Ixtoc I oil spill into the Gulf of Mexico, June 1979
- SS Atlantic Empress collision and spill near Trinidad and Tobago, August 1979
- MT Independența collision and spill near Istanbul, November 1979
- Nowruz oil spills into the Persian Gulf, March 1983
- Castillo de Bellver oil spill off the coast of South Africa, August 1983
- Odyssey tanker shipwreck and oil spill, off the coast of Nova Scotia, November 1988
- Exxon Valdez oil spill in the Prince William Sound, Alaska, March 1989
- Gulf War oil spill into the Persian Gulf, January 1991
- MT Haven explosion and oil spill of the coast of Italy, April 1991
- ABT Summer explosion and oil spill off the coast of Angola, May 1991
- Mingbulak oil spill in Uzbekistan, March 1992
- MV Braer shipwreck and oil spill at the Shetland Islands, January 1993
- Taylor oil spill off the coast of Louisiana, since 2004
- Sidoarjo mud flow triggered by Lapindo Brantas gas exploration in 2006; East Java, Indonesia
- Deepwater Horizon oil spill in the Gulf of Mexico, April to July 2010
- 2010 ExxonMobil oil spill in the Niger Delta in Nigeria, May 2010
- Jebel al-Zayt oil spill in the Red Sea, June 2010
- Xingang Port oil spill into the Yellow Sea, July 2010
- Sanchi oil tanker collision in the East China Sea, January 2018
- Norilsk oil spill in Siberia in Russia in between May and June 2020.
- MV Wakashio oil spill in south Mauritius, since July 2020
- El Palito oil spill off the coast of Venezuela, since July 2020

=== Nuclear ===
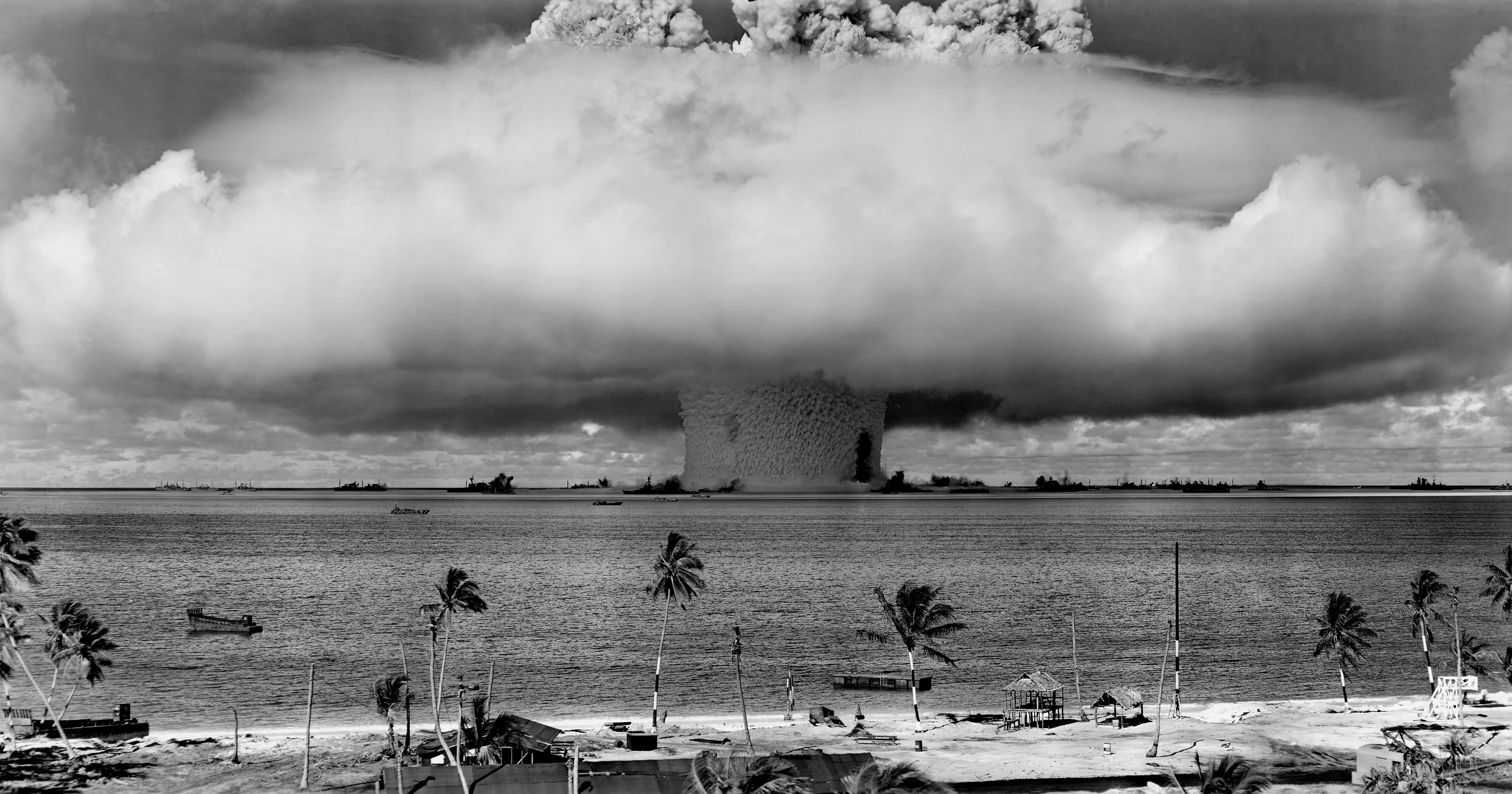
Mushroom-shaped cloud and water column from the underwater nuclear explosion of July 25, 1946, which was part of Operation Crossroads

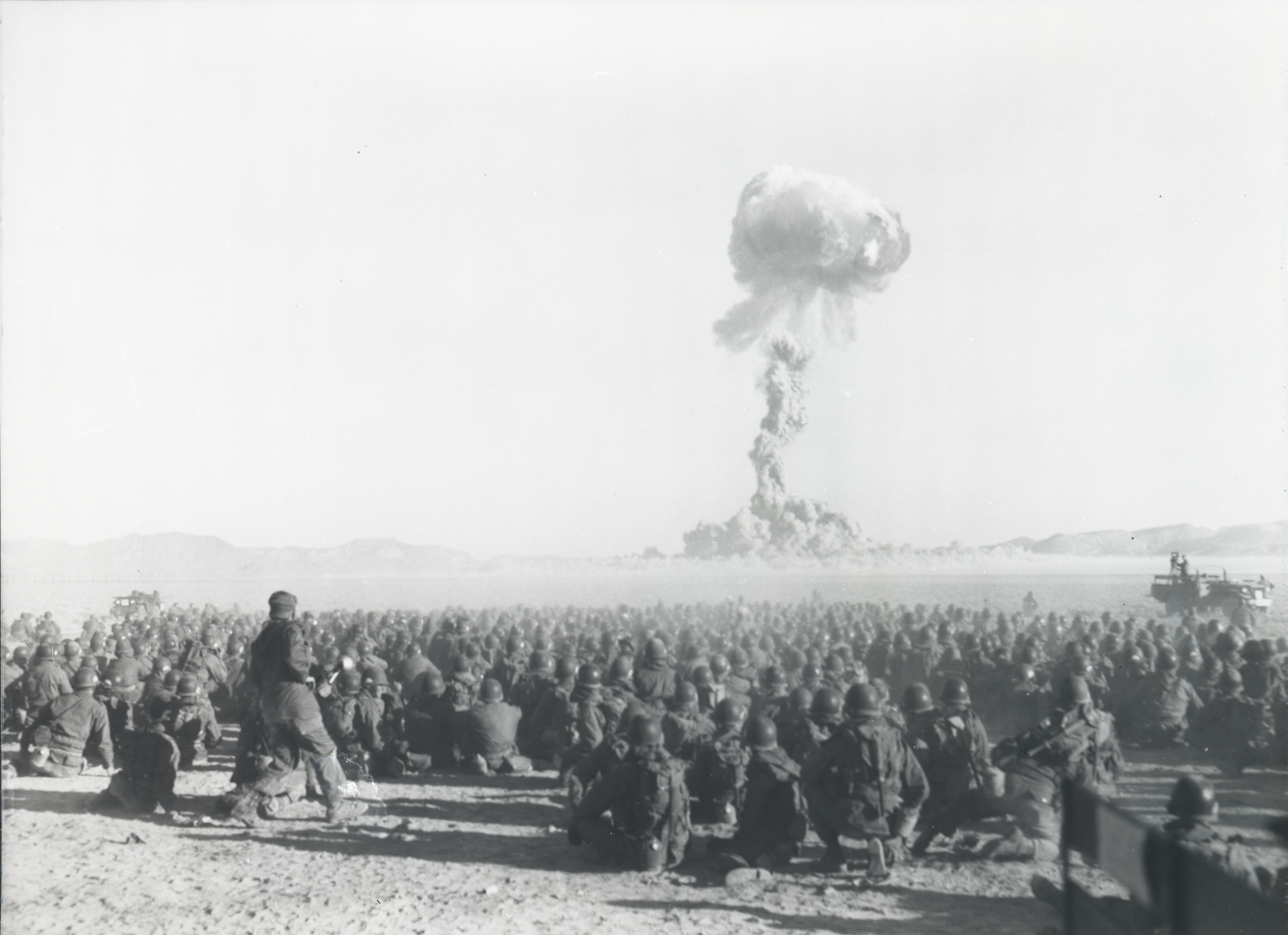
November 1951 nuclear test at the Nevada Test Site, from Operation Buster, with a yield of 21 kilotons. It was the first U.S. nuclear field exercise conducted on land; troops shown are 6 mi (9.7 km) from the blast.

- Chernobyl disaster in 1986 in Chernobyl, Ukraine killed 49 people and was estimated to have damaged almost $7 billion of property". Radioactive fallout from the accident concentrated near Belarus, Ukraine and Russia and at least 350,000 people were forcibly resettled away from these areas. After the accident, "traces of radioactive deposits unique to Chernobyl were found in nearly every country in the northern hemisphere".
- Fukushima Daiichi nuclear disaster: Following an earthquake, tsunami, and failure of cooling systems at Fukushima I Nuclear Power Plant and issues concerning other nuclear facilities in Japan on March 11, 2011, a nuclear emergency was declared. This was the first time a nuclear emergency had been declared in Japan, and 140,000 residents within 20 km of the plant were evacuated. Explosions and a fire have resulted in dangerous levels of radiation, sparking a stock market collapse and panic-buying in supermarkets.
- Mayak nuclear waste storage tank explosion, (Chelyabinsk, Soviet Union, September 29, 1957), 200+ people died and 270,000 people were exposed to dangerous radiation levels. Over thirty small communities had been removed from Soviet maps between 1958 and 1991.
- Windscale fire, United Kingdom, October 8, 1957. Fire ignites plutonium piles and contaminates surrounding dairy farms.
- Soviet submarine K-431 accident, August 10, 1985 (10 people died and 49 suffered radiation injuries).
- Soviet submarine K-19 accident, July 4, 1961 (8 deaths and more than 30 people were over-exposed to radiation).
- Nuclear testing at Moruroa and Fangataufa in the Pacific Ocean
- Fallout from the Castle Bravo nuclear test at Bikini Atoll in the Marshall Islands
- The health of Downwinders
- Atomic bombings of Hiroshima and Nagasaki Within the first two to four months of the bombings, the acute effects killed 90,000–166,000 people in Hiroshima and 60,000–80,000 in Nagasaki, with roughly half of the deaths in each city occurring on the first day.
- Three Mile Island, 1979 - It is the most significant accident in U.S. commercial nuclear power plant history. On the seven-point International Nuclear Event Scale, it is rated Level 5 – Accident with Wider Consequences.
- Hanford Nuclear, 1986 – The U.S. government declassifies 19,000 pages of documents indicating that between 1946 and 1986, the Hanford Site near Richland, Washington, released thousands of US gallons of radioactive liquids. Radioactive waste was both released into the air and flowed into the Columbia River (which flows to the Pacific Ocean). In 2014, the Hanford legacy continues with billions of dollars spent annually in a seemingly endless cleanup of leaking underground

=== Air/land/water ===
- Proliferation of plastic shopping bags
- Hong Kong Plastic Disaster

==== Air ====
- The 1983 Melbourne dust storm
- The 1997 Southeast Asian haze
- The 2005 Malaysian haze
- The 2006 Southeast Asian haze
- The 2016 Great Smog of Delhi
- The 2019 Amazon rainforest wildfires
- Cancer Alley
- The Donora Smog of 1948
- The Great Smog of 1952
- Health problems due to the Jinkanpo Atsugi Incinerator
- Kuwaiti oil fires
- Yokkaichi asthma

==== Land ====
- Dust Bowl in central United States (1930s)
- Contaminated soils in Māpua, New Zealand, due to the operation of an agricultural chemicals factory from 1932 to 1989
- Basin F, a disposal site in the United States created in 1956 for contaminated liquid wastes from the chemical manufacturing operations of the Army and its lessee Shell Chemicals company
- Coastal erosion in Louisiana
- Nigeria gully erosion crisis, since before 1980
- Exide lead contamination at seven locations in the United States, since 1989
- Electronic waste in Guiyu, since the 1990s
- 2006 Côte d'Ivoire toxic waste dump
- In Thathri Disaster 2023, the land and residential houses started cracking in Nayi Basti Thathri of Jammu and Kashmir, India.

==== Water ====
- Amoco Cadiz oil spill off the coast of France in 1978
- Cheakamus River derailment which polluted a river with caustic soda
- Deepwater Horizon oil spill
- Diamond Alkali dumping of "bad batches" of the herbicide Agent Orange and byproducts of its production into the Passaic River during the 1960s and 1970s, contaminating river sediments with 2,3,7,8-Tetrachlorodibenzodioxin, PCBs, and PAHs. Diamond Alkali was added to the EPA's National Priorities List in 1987 and cleanup of the Lower Passaic is still underway.
- Draining and development of the Everglades
- Draining of the Mesopotamian Marshes in the 1990s
- DuPont dumping of perfluorooctanoic acid (PFOA) in Parkersburg, West Virginia, USA 1951-2003.
- Effects of polluted water in the Berkeley Pit in the United States
- Gulf of Mexico dead zone
- Ignition and conflagration (13 times from 1868 to 1969) of the Cuyahoga River in Ohio, United States
- The Jiyeh Power Station oil spill in the Mediterranean region
- Lake Okeechobee is heavily polluted and during extreme events releases large volumes of polluted water into the St. Lucie River estuary and the Caloosahatchee River estuary.
- Loss of Louisiana Wetlands due to Mississippi River levees, saltwater intrusion through manmade channels, timber harvesting, subsidence, and hurricane damage.
- Mercury contamination in Grassy Narrows pollution of Wabigoon River
- Oder environmental disaster in 2022
- Red Hill water crisis in Hawaiʻi, United States beginning in November 2021
- Sandoz chemical spill, severely polluting the Rhine in 1986
- Selenium poisoning of wildlife due to farm runoff used to create Kesterson National Wildlife Refuge, and the artificial wetland

===== Marine =====
- Coral bleaching
- Gulf of Mexico Dead Zone due to high-nutrient fertilizer runoff from the Midwest that is drained through the Mississippi River.
- The artificial Osborne Reef off the coast of Fort Lauderdale, Florida, in the United States
- Dumping of conventional and chemical munitions in Beaufort's Dyke, a sea trench between Northern Ireland and Scotland
- Marine debris
- Environmental threats to the Great Barrier Reef
- Nurdles, plastic pellet typically under 5mm in diameter
- The Great Pacific Garbage Patch
- Minamata disease, mercury poisoning in Japan
- Mercury in fish
- Ocean acidification due to anthropogenic greenhouse gas emissions
- 2022 Caspian seal die-off
- Industrial waste dumping in Central Vietnam from Formosa Ha Tinh Steel, which kills tons of marine creatures and destroys the ecosystem

== See also ==
- Natural disaster
- List of environmental issues
- Timeline of environmental events
- Index of environmental articles
- Ecophagy, the consuming of an ecosystem
- List of Superfund sites in the United States
