= List of shipwrecks in 1972 =

The list of shipwrecks in 1972 includes ships sunk, foundered, grounded, or otherwise lost during 1972.

table of contents
1972
Jan	Feb	Mar	Apr
May	Jun	Jul	Aug
Sep	Oct	Nov	Dec
Unknown date

== January ==
=== 4 January ===
List of shipwrecks: 4 January 1972
Ship	State	Description
Cydonia	United States	The 63-gross register ton, 68-foot (20.7 m) motor vessel sank near Point Hugh (57°34′10″N 133°48′30″W) in Stephens Passage in the Alexander Archipelago in Southeast Alaska.

=== 9 January ===
List of shipwrecks: 9 January 1972
Ship	State	Description
Dona Anita	Somalia	The cargo ship foundered off British Columbia, Canada with the loss of all hands.
Seawise University	Hong Kong	Seawise University The university ship, formerly the ocean liner Queen Elizabeth, caught fire in Victoria Harbour, Hong Kong. She capsized the next day. The fire was extinguished on 13 January. She was scrapped in situ in 1974.

=== 11 January ===
List of shipwrecks: 11 January 1972
Ship	State	Description
Kay	United States	The motor vessel was destroyed by fire at Pennock Island in the Alexander Archipelago in Southeast Alaska near Ketchikan, Alaska.

=== 13 January ===
List of shipwrecks: 13 January 1972
Ship	State	Description
Bab	United States	The 36-gross register ton, 103.7-foot (31.6 m) barge was wrecked in Cook Inlet on the south-central coast of Alaska.
Hydrophane	Romania	The cargo ship collided with Mozdak (flag unknown) off Odesa, Soviet Union. Both vessels sank.
Owenduv	Panama	The refrigerated coaster capsized and sank in the Atlantic Ocean 10 nautical miles (19 km) off Leixões, Portugal after her cargo shifted.She was on a voyage from "Villagarcia" to a Moroccan port.

=== 17 January ===
List of shipwrecks: 17 January 1972
Ship	State	Description
Maersk Fighter	Denmark	The oil rig supply vessel foundered in the North Sea 12 nautical miles (22 km) west of the Vyl Lightship with the loss of nine of her nineteen crew.

=== 18 January ===
List of shipwrecks: 18 January 1972
Ship	State	Description
Delfini	Greece	The fishing trawler ran aground on the Oukacha Rocks, off Casablanca, Morocco. She was declared a total loss

=== 27 January ===
List of shipwrecks: 27 January 1972
Ship	State	Description
Queen Frederica	Greece	The cruise ship was diven aground in the Fowey Estuary after breaking free from her moorings in a storm.

== February ==
=== 1 February ===
List of shipwrecks: 1 February 1972
Ship	State	Description
V. A. Fogg	United States	The T2 tanker sank in the Gulf of Mexico 50 nautical miles (93 km) off Galveston, Texas (28°36′N 94°49′W) after an on-board explosion.

=== 4 February ===
List of shipwrecks: 4 February 1972
Ship	State	Description
Asian Logger	Philippines	The barge struck a submerged object (14°40′N 122°22′W) and was beached on Jomalig Island, where the wreck was apparently abandoned.

=== 6 February ===
List of shipwrecks: 6 February 1972
Ship	State	Description
Citta di Alessandria	Liberia	The cargo ship ran aground at Cape Apostolos Andreas, Cyprus. Seven crew rescued by a RAF helicopter.

=== 7 February ===
List of shipwrecks: 7 February 1972
Ship	State	Description
Trinity I	United States	The tug struck Lincoln Rock in Clarence Strait in the Alexander Archipelago in Southeast Alaska, then sank after slipping off the rock. Her two crewmen were rescued by the buoy tender USCGC Bittersweet ( United States Coast Guard).

=== 11 February ===
List of shipwrecks: 11 February 1972
Ship	State	Description
USS Hopewell	United States Navy	The decommissioned Fletcher-class destroyer was sunk as a target off San Clemente Island, California.
Lindblad Explorer	Norway	Ran aground near La Plaza Point, Antarctica. She was towed to Buenos Aires, Argentina and then to Kristiansand, Norway for repairs.

=== 13 February ===
List of shipwrecks: 13 February 1972
Ship	State	Description
Clio	Liberia	The ship caught fire off the coast of Angola and was abandoned. She sank on 21 February.
Ermioni	Greece	The cargo ship foundered in the Mediterranean off Cyprus. All 14 crew rescued by helicopters from HMS Bulwark (Royal Navy).
Vishva Kusum	India	The cargo ship was sunk by a mine in Chittagong Roads.

=== 17 February ===
List of shipwrecks: 17 February 1972
Ship	State	Description
Olympic Athlete	Greece	Ran aground, River Thames.

=== 18 February ===
List of shipwrecks: 18 February 1972
Ship	State	Description
Katmai	United States	While en route from Mobile, Alabama, where she had been built, to Kodiak, Alaska, the newly constructed crab-fishing vessel disappeared in the Gulf of Mexico with the loss of all four people – the owner, his wife, their eight-year-old child, and a crewman – aboard. Her wreck was discovered lying in 8,920 feet (2,720 m) of water approximately 200 nautical miles (370 km; 230 mi) off the United States Gulf Coast in 2012, and it was positively identified in 2013.

=== 19 February ===
List of shipwrecks: 19 February 1972
Ship	State	Description
Marcello G	Italy	The Empire Cadet-class coastal tanker capsized and sank at Naples. Declared a constructive total loss but later repaired and returned to service.

=== 21 February ===
List of shipwrecks: 21 February 1972
Ship	State	Description
SS-44	Soviet Navy	The rescue ship ran aground off Cape Korovyi whilst assisting with the refloating of the landing craft MDK-253 (Soviet Navy). She was refloated on 18 May and towed in to Murmansk. She was declared a constructive total loss.

=== 23 February ===
List of shipwrecks: 23 February 1972
Ship	State	Description
Philippos	Greece	The coaster caught fire, exploded and was beached at Keratsini. She was refloated on 6 March but declared a constructive total loss and was consequently scrapped.

=== 29 February ===
List of shipwrecks: 29 February 1972
Ship	State	Description
Benefit	Panama	The cargo ship foundered 160 nautical miles (300 km) south of Muroto, Japan. Her captain went down with the ship, the rest of her crew were rescued by two patrol boats (Japan Maritime Self-Defense Force).

=== Unknown date ===
List of shipwrecks: Unknown date in February 1972
Ship	State	Description
MDK-253	Soviet Navy	The landing craft was driven ashore at Cape Korovyi before 21 February.

== March ==
=== 1 March ===
List of shipwrecks: 1 March 1972
Ship	State	Description
Royal Fisher	United States	The crab-fishing vessel sank at Dutch Harbor, Alaska, after a runaway barge struck her.
Stenso	Sweden	Foundered in the Bay of Biscay (45°17′N 2°46′W).

=== 7 March ===
List of shipwrecks: 7 March 1972
Ship	State	Description
Gloria Jean	United States	During a voyage from Ketchikan to Metlakatla, Alaska, the 41-gross register ton, 50-foot (15.2 m) seiner disappeared near Walden Rocks (55°16′15″N 131°36′20″W) in Nichols Passage in the Alexander Archipelago in Southeast Alaska with the loss of her entire crew of three.
Katie H	United Kingdom	The coaster sank in the North Sea after colliding with an unnamed fishing boat (Belgium). One of her seven crew was killed.

=== 8 March ===
List of shipwrecks: 8 March 1972
Ship	State	Description
Lex	United States	The fishing vessel was destroyed by fire in the Shelikof Strait between mainland Alaska and the Kodiak Archipelago near Alligator Island (58°28′30″N 152°47′10″W) off the northern end of Afognak Island. The fishing vessel Rosemary (United States) rescued her crew of four.

=== 13 March ===
List of shipwrecks: 13 March 1972
Ship	State	Description
Escorpion	Mexico	The tug caught fire at Manzanillo whilst towing the burning T2 tanker Mary Ellen Conway (Panama) out of port.
Mary Ellen Conway	Panama	The T2 tanker exploded and caught fire at Manzanillo. Consequently scrapped.
Torodd	Norway	The fishing vessel/cargo ship was destroyed in a fire in Langevåg, Norway. Wreck scrapped in Trondheim, Norway in May 1975.

=== 19 March ===
List of shipwrecks: 19 March 1972
Ship	State	Description
USS Gansevoort	United States Navy	The decommissioned Benson-class destroyer was sunk as a target off Florida.

== April ==
=== 5 April ===
List of shipwrecks: 5 April 1972
Ship	State	Description
C-69	Vietnam People's Navy	Vietnam War: The blockade runner was scuttled when she was intercepted by enemy vessels near the border between Cambodia and South Vietnam. Six of her crewmen were killed. It is unclear whether the intercepting vessels were Cambodian, South Vietnamese, or both.

=== 6 April ===
List of shipwrecks: 6 April 1972
Ship	State	Description
Alasco 2	United States	The 17-gross register ton, 43-foot (13.1 m) fishing vessel sank off David Island (57°02′N 156°30′W) off the south coast of the Alaska Peninsula in Alaska.

=== 7 April ===
List of shipwrecks: 7 April 1972
Ship	State	Description
Avlis	Greece	Wrecked off Santorini.
Spruce	United States	The motor vessel was lost in bad weather at Point Manby (55°53′15″N 132°35′45″W) west of Yakutat, Alaska.

=== 21 April ===
List of shipwrecks: 21 April 1972
Ship	State	Description
Patriot	United States	After becoming disabled and drifting for six days, the fishing vessel came ashore at Gore Point (59°12′00″N 150°57′30″W) on the south-central coast of Alaska and was wrecked. A United States Coast Guard helicopter rescued her entire crew of three and a dog.

=== 22 April ===
List of shipwrecks: 22 April 1972
Ship	State	Description
Gilani	Canada	The Empire F type coaster capsized and sank at Montreal, Quebec, Canada. She was later refloated, repaired, and returned to service.

=== 23 April ===
List of shipwrecks: 23 April 1972
Ship	State	Description
USNS Cowanesque	United States Navy	The Suamico-class replenishment oiler ran aground off Henza, Japan (26°24′N 127°56′E). She was refloated and taken in to Sasebo. She was consequently scrapped.

=== 24 April ===
List of shipwrecks: 24 April 1972
Ship	State	Description
Nicolo Martini	Italy	The cargo ship struck a submerged object off Portoscuso, Sardinia, and was holed. She was beached to prevent her from sinking. She later was refloated but was declared a constructive total loss.

== May ==
=== 10 May ===
List of shipwrecks: 10 May 1972
Ship	State	Description
Shun Wing	Hong Kong	The cargo ship broke from her mooring and was driven into the ferry Macau (Hong Kong) at Hong Kong. Consequently scrapped.

=== 11 May ===
List of shipwrecks: 11 May 1972
Ship	State	Description
Royston Grange	United Kingdom	The 7,113-ton, British cargo liner, wrecked in Punta Indio Channel, Uruguay after colliding with the oil tanker Tien Chee (Liberia) and subsequent fire. She was the first British ship to be lost with all hands since World War II. 74 fatalities.

=== 12 May ===
List of shipwrecks: 12 May 1972
Ship	State	Description
USS Wilkes-Barre	United States Navy	The decommissioned Cleveland-class light cruiser was sunk as a target during tests of explosives.

=== 14 May ===
List of shipwrecks: 14 May 1972
Ship	State	Description
USS Fred T. Berry	United States Navy	The decommissioned Gearing-class destroyer was scuttled as an artificial reef off Key West, Florida, at 24°27.8′N 81°33.3′W.

=== 18 May ===
List of shipwrecks: 18 May 1972
Ship	State	Description
Toni Jean	United States	The 14-gross register ton, 32.5-foot (9.9 m) fishing vessel sank in the Gulf of Alaska approximately 12 nautical miles (22 km; 14 mi) east of Cape Saint Elias on the southern tip of Kayak Island in Alaska. One crewman swam to shore, but the other died.

=== 21 May ===
List of shipwrecks: 21 May 1972
Ship	State	Description
Victoria	Dominican Republic	The cargo ship was driven ashore at Rio Haina, Dominica. She was refloated and consequently scrapped in 1973.

=== 27 May ===
List of shipwrecks: 27 May 1972
Ship	State	Description
Addington	United States	The 40-gross register ton, 54-foot (16.5 m) fishing vessel sank with the loss of three lives in the Shelikof Strait near Cape Uganik (57.9666667°N 153.5058333°W) on the coast of Alaska′s Kodiak Island.

== June ==
=== 2 June ===
List of shipwrecks: 2 June 1972
Ship	State	Description
Traveler	United States	The motor vessel sank in Clarence Strait in the Alexander Archipelago in Southeast Alaska.

=== 9 June ===
List of shipwrecks: 9 July 1972
Ship	State	Description
Galinda	unknown	The cargo ship sank in the South China Sea. Ten crewmen died, 38 were rescued.
Helen B	United States	The 105-gross register ton 72.3-foot (22.0 m) fishing vessel was destroyed by fire in Peril Strait in the Alexander Archipelago in Southeast Alaska, halfway between Saook Bay (57.4453°N 135.1902°W) and Rodman Bay (57.4736°N 135.3648°W).

=== 15 June ===
List of shipwrecks: 15 July 1972
Ship	State	Description
Lucette		The schooner sank in the Pacific Ocean about 200 nautical miles (370 km) west of the Galapagos Islands after being holed by a pod of killer whales. All six people on board escaped in a life raft and a dinghy and drifted for 38 days before being rescued.

=== 18 June ===
List of shipwrecks: 18 June 1972
Ship	State	Description
Icebreaker II	United States	The speedboat was swamped and lost on the Yukon River in Alaska 23 miles (37 km) north of Ruby with the loss of one life.

=== 19 June ===
List of shipwrecks: 19 June 1972
Ship	State	Description
"Yukon Fisher"	United Kingdom	The 70.5-foot (21.5 m) fishing vessel struck a submerged object, flooded, and sank in the North Sea. Crew rescued by trawler "Hans Sme" (Netherlands).

=== 25 June ===
List of shipwrecks: 25 June 1972
Ship	State	Description
Debby	United States	The 12-gross register ton, 30-foot (9.1 m) fishing vessel was destroyed by fire at False Pass, Alaska.
Marcella	United States	The 14-gross register ton, 39.8-foot (12.1 m) fishing vessel sank at Stephens Island in Southeast Alaska.

=== 26 June ===
List of shipwrecks: 26 June 1972
Ship	State	Description
Leading Lady	United States	The 57-gross register ton, 57.8-foot (17.6 m) crab-fishing vessel sank quickly off the northeast coast of Montague Island at the entrance to Prince William Sound on the south-central coast of Alaska after striking an unidentified object. Her crew of three reached shore in a life raft.

=== Unknown date ===
List of shipwrecks: Unknown Date 1972
Ship	State	Description
Falcon Lady	United States	The tanker ran aground on Triton Island in the Paracel Islands in the South China Sea during a voyage from Da Nang, South Vietnam, to Subic Bay, the Philippines. The rescue and salvage ship USS Reclaimer (United States Navy) pulled her off on 3 July.

== July ==
=== 1 July ===
List of shipwrecks: 1 July 1972
Ship	State	Description
Lefteria	Denmark	The schooner was in collision with an unnamed weather ship (France) and sank with the loss of seven of her eleven crew.

=== 4 July ===
List of shipwrecks: 4 July 1972
Ship	State	Description
S. A. Vanguard	South Africa	The Victory ship capsized and sank at off Karachi, Pakistan due to her cargo shifting.

=== 10 July ===
List of shipwrecks: 10 July 1972
Ship	State	Description
London Statesman	United Kingdom	Vietnam War: The cargo ship was sunk by Viet Cong sabotage at Nha Trang, South Vietnam.

=== 12 July ===
List of shipwrecks: 12 July 1972
Ship	State	Description
Oriental Falcon	Liberia	The Victory ship ran aground on the Pratas Reef, in the South China Sea (23°37′N 116°53′E). She was on a voyage from Kaohsiung, Taiwan to Hong Kong. The vessel was subsequently extensively looted and declared a total loss.

=== 13 July ===
List of shipwrecks: 13 July 1972
Ship	State	Description
USS O'Brien	United States Navy	The decommissioned Allen M. Sumner-class destroyer was sunk as a target in the Pacific Ocean off California.

=== 20 July ===
List of shipwrecks: 20 July 1972
Ship	State	Description
Montclair	United States	The 7-gross register ton, 28.6-foot (8.7 m) fishing vessel was destroyed by fire at Kvichak (56°38′30″N 133°15′30″W), Alaska.

=== 22 July ===
List of shipwrecks: 22 July 1972
Ship	State	Description
Simos	Greece	The cargo ship ran aground near Cape St. Vincent, Portugal. She was on a voyage from "Ashod" to a French port. She was refloated on 22 August and put in to Setúbal, Portugal, where she was laid up. Scrapped at Bilbao, Spain in September 1973.

=== 24 July ===
List of shipwrecks: 24 July 1972
Ship	State	Description
Abasin	Pakistan	The cargo ship struck the wreck of the Victory ship S. A. Vanguard (South Africa) at Karachi and was beached.

=== Unknown date ===
List of shipwrecks: Unknown date 1972
Ship	State	Description
Rustringen	West Germany	Sank off Margate, Kent. Later raised and scrapped.
Vermont	Ecuador	The tanker ran aground off Guayaquil and wrecked. Later scrapped in situ.

== August ==
=== 6 August ===
List of shipwrecks: 6 August 1972
Ship	State	Description
Stade	West Germany	The coaster was cut in two when in collision with Ciudad di Manizales (Colombia) in the English Channel and sank with the loss of eleven of her 13 crew. The stern section sank, but the bow section remained afloat. It was sunk by the French Navy as it was a hazard to navigation.

=== 9 August ===
List of shipwrecks: 9 August 1972
Ship	State	Description
Amoy	Somalia	The cargo ship ran aground near Cape Negrais, India and was declared a constructive total loss. She was on a voyage from Penang, Malaysia to Calcutta.

=== 21 August ===
List of shipwrecks: 21 August 1972
Ship	State	Description
Texanita	Liberia	The supertanker collided with the supertanker Oswego Guardian (Liberia) 20 nautical miles (37 km) south of Cape Agulhas, South Africa, suffered a massive explosion, and sank with the loss of 46 of her 50 crew members.

=== 27 August ===
List of shipwrecks: 27 August 1972
Ship	State	Description
T-319	Vietnam People's Navy	Vietnam War: The T-333/Project 123K-class motor torpedo boat was damaged by gunfire by the heavy cruiser USS Newport News and guided-missile destroyer USS Robison and finished off by aircraft from the aircraft carrier USS Coral Sea (all United States Navy) off Haiphong, North Vietnam.
T-349	Vietnam People's Navy	Vietnam War: The T-333/Project 123K-class motor torpedo boat was damaged by gunfire by the heavy cruiser USS Newport News and guided-missile destroyer USS Robison and finished off by aircraft from the aircraft carrier USS Coral Sea (all United States Navy) off Haiphong, North Vietnam.

== September ==
=== 3 September ===
List of shipwrecks: 3 September 1972
Ship	State	Description
Unidentified cabin cruiser	Unknown	The cabin cruiser sank when a wave capsized it after its engine failed in the Indian Ocean off Lourenço Marques, Mozambique. Three of the four people on board drowned. The only survivor was a South African woman who swam 25 nautical miles (46 km; 29 mi) to safety on a buoy and reported that two dolphins protected her from sharks and helped her stay afloat when she tired during her swim.

=== 4 September ===
List of shipwrecks: 4 September 1972
Ship	State	Description
Taoyuno	Republic of China	The fishing vessel was sunk with the loss of 22 of her 23 crew when it was in collision with the bulk carrier Marylisa (Greece) 600 nautical miles (1,100 km) west of the Cape of Good Hope.

=== 5 September ===
List of shipwrecks: 5 September 1972
Ship	State	Description
Southland	United States	The motor vessel was wrecked in Berners Bay near Point Bridget (58°40′45″N 134°59′20″W) in Southeast Alaska.

=== 16 September ===
List of shipwrecks: 16 September 1972
Ship	State	Description
Peregrin II	United States	The motor vessel sank in Horton Cove (59°14′10″N 135°26′15″W) at Haines, Alaska.

=== 19 September ===
List of shipwrecks: 19 September 1972
Ship	State	Description
HMSAS Natal	South African Navy	The decommissioned Loch-class frigate was sunk as a target off the Cape of Good Hope by gunfire from the frigate SAS President Steyn ( South African Navy}) and depth charges dropped by South African Air Force Avro Shackleton maritime patrol aircraft.

=== 27 September ===
List of shipwrecks: 27 September 1972
Ship	State	Description
Tradewind	United States	The motor vessel was destroyed by fire in Sergius Narrows (57°24′20″N 135°38′00″W) north of Sitka, Alaska.

== October ==
=== 1 October ===
List of shipwrecks: 1 October 1972
Ship	State	Description
Genimar	Liberia	The cargo ship sank in the English Channel off Kent after it was in collision with Larry L (Greece). All 24 crew were rescued by Larry L.

=== 6 October ===
List of shipwrecks: 6 October 1972
Ship	State	Description
Algorail	Canada	The bulk carrier collided with a pier at Holland, Michigan in bad weather. A 12-foot (4 m) hole was torn in the vessel's bow and the ship sank. The ship was later refloated, repaired and returned to service.

=== 11 October ===
List of shipwrecks: 11 October 1972
Ship	State	Description
La Sirène	Marine Nationale	The submarine sank in an accident at Lorient naval base. All seven crew on board escaped.

=== 16 October ===
List of shipwrecks: 16 October 1972
Ship	State	Description
USS Stanton	United States Navy	The decommissioned Edsall-class destroyer escort was sunk as a target off Puerto Rico.

=== 22 October ===
List of shipwrecks: 22 April 1972
Ship	State	Description
Ballyginniff	United Kingdom	The Troubles: The barge was bombed and sunk by a Provisional Irish Republican Army unit.
Lough Neagh	United Kingdom	The Troubles: The barge was bombed and sunk by a Provisional Irish Republican Army unit.

=== 24 October ===
List of shipwrecks: 24 October 1972
Ship	State	Description
Frisco	United States	The 26-gross register ton, 46.3-foot (14.1 m) fishing vessel sank in the Gulf of Alaska approximately 11 nautical miles (20 km; 13 mi) southeast of Kodiak, Alaska.

== November ==
=== 1 November ===
List of shipwrecks: 1 November 1972
Ship	State	Description
Lazarette	United States	The crab-fishing vessel sank with the loss of two lives in Peril Strait in the Alexander Archipelago in Southeast Alaska.
Siang-Yung	Taiwan	The Victory ship was scuttled south of Balboa, Panama (7°44′N 79°21′W.

=== 13 November ===
List of shipwrecks: 13 November 1972
Ship	State	Description
Metric	Denmark	The coaster ran aground off Texel, Netherlands. Nine people and two dogs were rescued by Royal Netherlands Navy helicopters.
Wan Chun	People's Republic of China	Wan Chun. The cargo ship ran aground north of IJmuiden, Netherlands in a storm. All 27 crew were rescued.

=== 14 November ===
List of shipwrecks: 14 November 1972
Ship	State	Description
Ypoploiarchos Merlin	Royal Hellenic Navy	The vehicle carrier sank with the loss of 45 crew after a collision with the supertanker World Hero (Greece).

=== 19 November ===
List of shipwrecks: 19 November 1996
Ship	State	Description
Dora R	United States	The 60-foot (18.3 m) purse seine fishing vessel sank in Peril Strait in the Alexander Archipelago in Southeast Alaska, 75 nautical miles (139 km; 86 mi) south of Juneau, Alaska, with the loss of two lives. Her lone survivor, her captain, was rescued from the water by a helicopter.

=== 27 November ===
List of shipwrecks: 27 November 1972
Ship	State	Description
Tor Hugo	Norway	The fishing vessel sank off West Africa after suffering leaks and disastrous hull failure.

=== 30 November ===
List of shipwrecks: 30 November 1972
Ship	State	Description
Burtonia	United Kingdom	The coaster capsized and sank 40 nautical miles (74 km) off Lowestoft, Suffolk with the loss of four of her eight crew.

== December ==
=== 12 December ===
List of shipwrecks: 12 December 1972
Ship	State	Description
Pelias	Greece	The cargo ship sprang a leak and foundered 250 nautical miles (460 km) south of Durban, South Africa. Her crew survived. Pelias was on a voyage from Maceió, Brazil to Saigon, South Vietnam.
Tyke IV	United States	The 9-gross register ton, 30.2-foot (9.2 m) fishing vessel was destroyed by fire at Hoonah, Alaska.

=== 15 December ===
List of shipwrecks: 15 December 1972
Ship	State	Description
Rumba	West Germany	The cargo ship was abandoned when its cargo of railway locomotives broke free of their chains, causing the ship to list when she was 200 nautical miles (370 km) south east of Cape Race. Newfoundland.
Lincoln Express	Panama	The cargo ship foundered off Puerto Rico. All 21 crew rescued by the United States Coast Guard.
Nova	Sweden	The cargo ship sank after it was in collision with Teofani-Livanos (Greece) in the Baltic Sea. One crewman was killed.

=== 18 December ===
List of shipwrecks: 18 December 1972
Ship	State	Description
Namhae	South Korea	The Victory ship ran aground at Pusan. She was on a voyage from Ulsan to Saigon, Vietnam. She broke her back and was declared a constructive total loss.

=== 19 December ===
List of shipwrecks: 19 December 1972
Ship	State	Description
Arctic Sea	United States	The 57-gross register ton, 49.9-foot (15.2 m) motor vessel sank in Prince William Sound on the south-central coast of Alaska.
T-906	Vietnam People's Navy	Vietnam War: The Project 183R missile boat was sunk by aircraft in Ha Long, North Vietnam.

=== 22 December ===
List of shipwrecks: 22 December 1972
Ship	State	Description
Argus V	West Germany	The tug capsized and sank in the English Channel 7 nautical miles (13 km) off Cap Griz Nez, France. All five crew were rescued.

=== 24 December ===
List of shipwrecks: 24 December 1972
Ship	State	Description
Pacrover	Liberia	The bulk carrier, a converted T2 tanker, disappeared in the North Pacific Ocean 760 nautical miles (1,410 km) south of Kodiak Island and 800 nautical miles (1,500 km; 920 mi) south of Kodiak, Alaska, with the loss of her entire crew of 30 South Korean nationals. Searchers found only four overturned lifeboats, some debris, and an oil slick.
Sea Star	South Korea	After burning for five days following a 19 December collision with the tanker Horta Barbosa (Brazil), the supertanker sank in the Persian Gulf after a series of explosions.

=== 26 December ===
List of shipwrecks: 19 December 1972
Ship	State	Description
Sea Star	Denmark	The cargo ship ran aground in a gale near the Cascais Lighthouse, Cabo Raso, Portugal and broke in two .

=== 27 December ===
List of shipwrecks: 27 December 1972
Ship	State	Description
St. Ives	Italy	The 938 GRT bucket dredger capsized and sank northwest of Ferrol, Spain (44°21′N 08°57′W) while under tow by Smit Pioneer (Netherlands). St. Ives was being towed from Portsmouth, Hampshire, United Kingdom to Palermo, Sicily.

== Unknown date ==
List of shipwrecks: Unknown date 1972
Ship	State	Description
Allah Mina	Unknown	The cement barge sank in the Persian Gulf in approximately 1972.
Eager	Ghana	The 88-foot (27 m), 102-ton trawler was sunk sometime in 1972.
Fran S	United States	After the 84-foot (25.6 m) tug had sunk during dredging operations and then been refloated, she was scuttled as an artificial reef in the North Atlantic Ocean south of Long Island off Atlantic Beach, New York, in 80 feet (24 m) of water sometime in 1972.
Helen	United States	The 9-gross register ton 30.3-foot (9.2 m) fishing vessel was destroyed by fire at Cordova, Alaska.
Nasr	Egyptian Navy	The corvette was sunk as a target c. 1972 by P-15 Termit (NATO reporting name "SS-N-2" and "Styx") anti-ship missiles.
P. T. Teti	United States	The 80-foot (24 m) tug sank during a storm in 100 feet (30 m) of water in the Atlantic Ocean off Sakonnet Point, Rhode Island, at 41°20.9′N 071°14.5′W sometime in 1972.

== Sources ==
- Chernyshev, Alexander Alekseevich (2012). Погибли без боя. Катастрофы русских кораблей XVIII–XX вв [They died without a fight. Catastrophes of Russian ships of the XVIII-XX centuries] (in Russian). Veche.
- Du Toit, Allan (1992). South Africa's Fighting Ships: Past and Present. Rivonia, South Africa: Ashanti Publishing. ISBN 1-874800-50-2.
- Lane, Anthony (2009). Shipwrecks of Kent. Stroud: The History Press. ISBN 978-0-7524-1720-2.
- Mitchell, WH; Sawyer, LA (1990). The Empire Ships (Second ed.). London, New York, Hamburg, Hong Kong: Lloyd's of London Press Ltd. ISBN 1-85044-275-4.
- Oterhals, Leo (1997). Båter, baser og barske menn (in Norwegian). Molde: Lagunen. p. 75. ISBN 8290757115.
- Sawyer, L. A.; Mitchell, W. H. (1974). Victory Ships and Tankers. Newton Abbot: David and Charles. ISBN 0 7153 6036 1.
