= Sea star (disambiguation) =

A sea star is an echinoderm belonging to the class Asteroidea and otherwise known as a starfish.

Sea star or seastar may also refer to:

- Sea Star Festival, summer music festival in Umag, Croatia
- AAC SeaStar, a two-seat biplane from Canada
- Dornier Seastar, an amphibious aircraft with two engines in a push-pull configuration
- MV Sea Star, a supertanker
- Sea Star Awards, Argentine entertainment awards
- SeaStar, or OrbView-2, the satellite hosting the SeaWiFS instrument
- SeaStar, the communications processors in Cray XT3 and XT4 supercomputers
- Lockheed T2V SeaStar
- Sea Star (film), a Canadian short drama film
