= Shangba =

Shangba 上坝村
- Village
- Location in Guangdong
- Coordinates: 24°27′39″N 113°48′48″E
- Country: People's Republic of China
- Province: Guangdong
- Prefecture-level city: Shaoguan
- County: Wengyuan
- Town: Xinjiang

Shangba
- Traditional Chinese: 上壩村
- Simplified Chinese: 上坝村
Transcriptions
Standard Mandarin
- Hanyu Pinyin: Shàngbà Cūn

Shangba is a village of about 3,300 people administered by Xinjiang Town in Wengyuan County, Guangdong. It is an agricultural village, with rice and sugar cane being major crops. In 2007 the village acquired the nickname China's "Village of Death" due to the extremely high incidence of cancer in its population.

In addition, the local river, the Hengshui River, known locally as "The Dead River", is Shangba's only water supply, and it has become so polluted that it is endangering the health of those living nearby. One of the major pollutants in the river and well water is lead, which a provincial research institute reported as being present in the well water at some fifteen times what the national government set as a maximum acceptable rate for drinking water.

The presumed source of the pollution is the Dabaoshan Mine for zinc, once Asia's largest mine for this mineral. The village's crops are also highly contaminated.

In 2020 it was reported that over 1 billion Yuan was spent on soil remediation and improved mining processes, reducing the level of pollutants considerably.
