= Longxian, Guangdong =

Town in Guangdong, China

Coordinates: 34°54′N 106°51′E

Longxian Town (Chinese: 龙仙镇) is the county town of Wengyuan County, one of the counties of Shaoguan city in Guangdong province, China. Longxian Town has been developing over hundreds of years. During the late Qing dynasty, it had a population of approximately 300 people; as of January 2014, its population has increased to over 130,000 people. Though considered a small town by Chinese standards, it has its own industrial development, regional fruit, and tourist attractions.

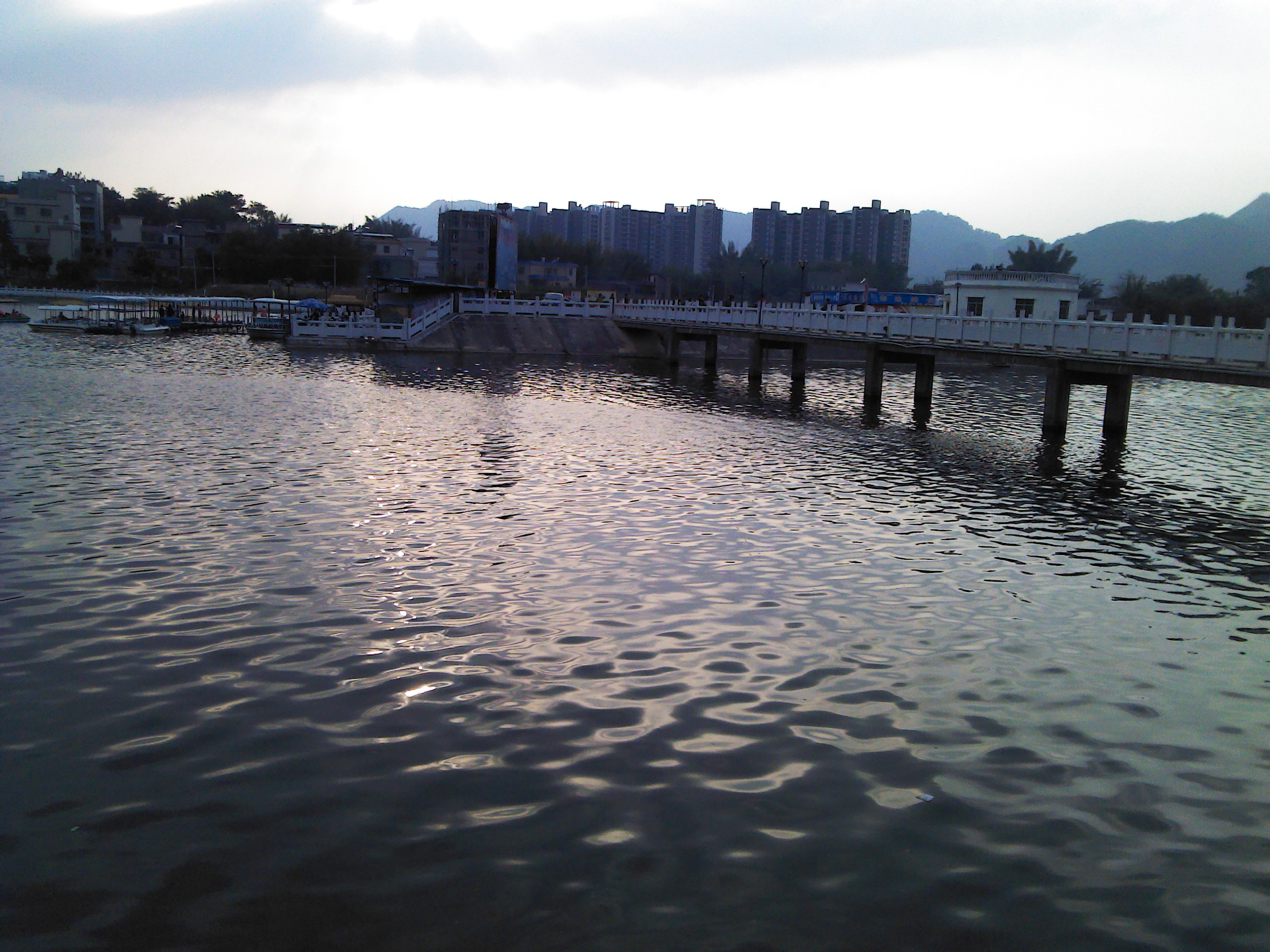
It is the Long Lake of Longxian Town and part of the area of Longxian Town around the lake.

== History ==
In the late Qing dynasty, Longxian Town was just a small countryside fair with about 300 people. In the winter of 1939, the original county town of Wengyuan County was destroyed by Japanese plane bombing. Therefore, in the following spring, Longxian Town became the county town of Wengyuan County.

Since 1940s, Longxian Town has become the political, economic, and cultural center of Wengyuan County.

In December 2004, Longxian Town combined the old Longxian Town, Nanpu Town (Chinese: 南浦镇) and Sanhua Town (三华镇) together. Now the new Longxian Town covers an area of 427.3 square kilometers with a population of over 130,000. Among others, 65 thousand people are urban residents while another 65 thousand are rural population.

== Economy ==
Longxian Town's economy mainly has two parts: agriculture and industry.

In terms of agriculture, Longxian Town develops sericulture, sugar cane, rice, vegetable, fruit, fishery and animal husbandry.

As for the industry, it mainly has coal industry, hydropower industry, construction industry, furniture industry and textiles industry. During these years, these industries have been developing quickly. Until now, there are more than 4000 enterprises and some 10,000 employees.

== Regional fruit ==
=== Sanhua plum ===
First grew in the period of Chinese Jiajing Emperor (Chia-ching Emperor; Chinese: 嘉靖,16 September 1507 – 23 January 1567) in Ming dynasty, Sanhua plum 三华李) has already had a long history of 500 years now. It origins in the Sanhua Town and is one of the famous regional fruits in Longxian Town. What's more, it has become one of the most famous fruits in China's Guangdong and Guangxi provinces.

On June 25, 1992, Wengyuan County held the first "Sanhua Plum Festival", which attracted many businessmen to visit Longxian Town and invest to Sanhua plum business.

=== Jiuxian peach ===
Jiuxian peach (Chinese: 九仙桃) named after its original habitat, the Jiuxian village in Jiangwei Town of Wengyuan County. It was first cultivated in the time of China's Jiajing Emperor in Ming dynasty. It has had 500 years' history up till now. Jiuxian peach is famous for its large fruit, small kernel, and its sweet taste. The weight of each peach varies from 100 grams to 300 grams.

== Tourist Attraction ==
=== Donghua Temple ===
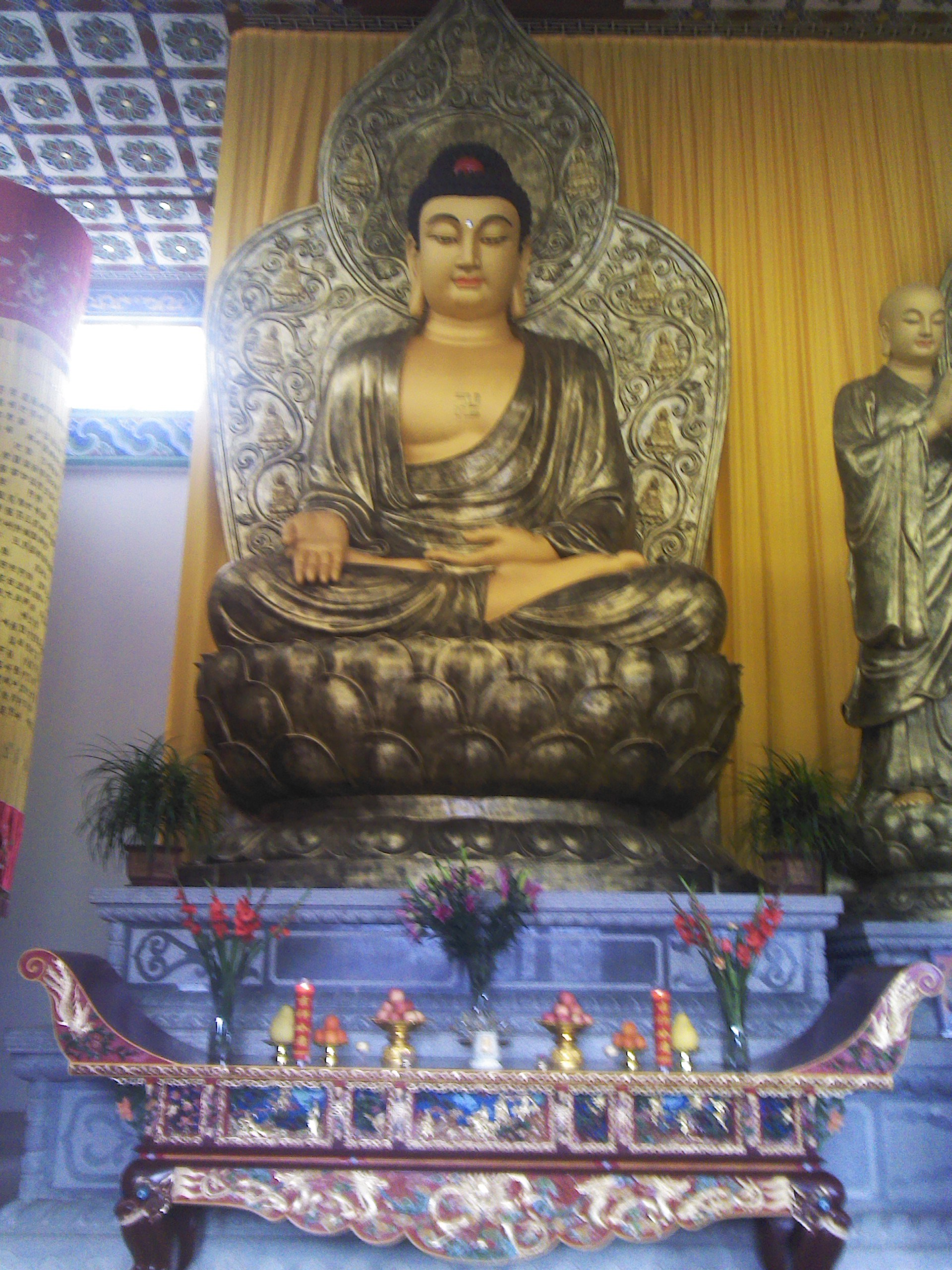
A buddha statue in Donghua Temple.

Donghua Temple is a Buddhist temple. It grew out of the Lingjiu Temple, which was built by an honorific Indian Buddhist monk, Zhiyaosanzang (Chinese: 智药三藏) in China's Southern Dynasties(420AD-589AD) in 502 AD.

In 661 AD in China's Tang dynasty, the Sixth Patriarch rebuilt the Lingjiu Temple. However, it was ruined by wars during China's Yuan dynasty. In the Ming dynasty, a monk named Gengwu rebuilt the Lingjiu Temple again and changed its name into Donghua Temple. Until now, Donghua Temple has had a long history of 1489 years. What's more, Donghua Temple has a longer history than Nanhua Temple, which is an important temple in Shaoguan city as well as in China. The word "The bell of Nanhua Temple, and the wind of Donghua Temple" is eulogized by people now and in the past dynasties.

In 1996, the project of Donghua Temple Resort District began. Until now, the Donghua Temple has built up many great buildings such as the Great Buddha's Hall, Memorial Archway, Guanyin Zen Gardens and so on.
