= Qianhuang =

Qianhuang (simplified Chinese: 前黄; traditional Chinese: 前黃) may refer to the following towns in China:

- Qianhuang, Fujian, in Quanzhou, Fujian
- Qianhuang, Jiangsu, in Changzhou, Jiangsu
