= Xinjiang, Wengyuan County =

Xinjiang 新江镇
- Town
- Location in Guangdong
- Coordinates: 24.4585°N 113.8338°E
- Country: People's Republic of China
- Province: Guangdong
- Prefecture-level city: Shaoguan
- County: Wengyuan County
- Time zone: UTC+8 (China Standard)

Xinjiang (Chinese: 新江; pinyin: Xīnjiāng) is a town under the administration of Wengyuan County, Shaoguan, Guangdong, China. As of 2018, the town administers one neighbourhood committee and 19 village committees, including Shangba, which in 2007 acquired the nickname of "China's Village of Death".
