= Typhoon Vicente =

Pacific typhoon in 2012

Typhoon Vicente (Ferdie)
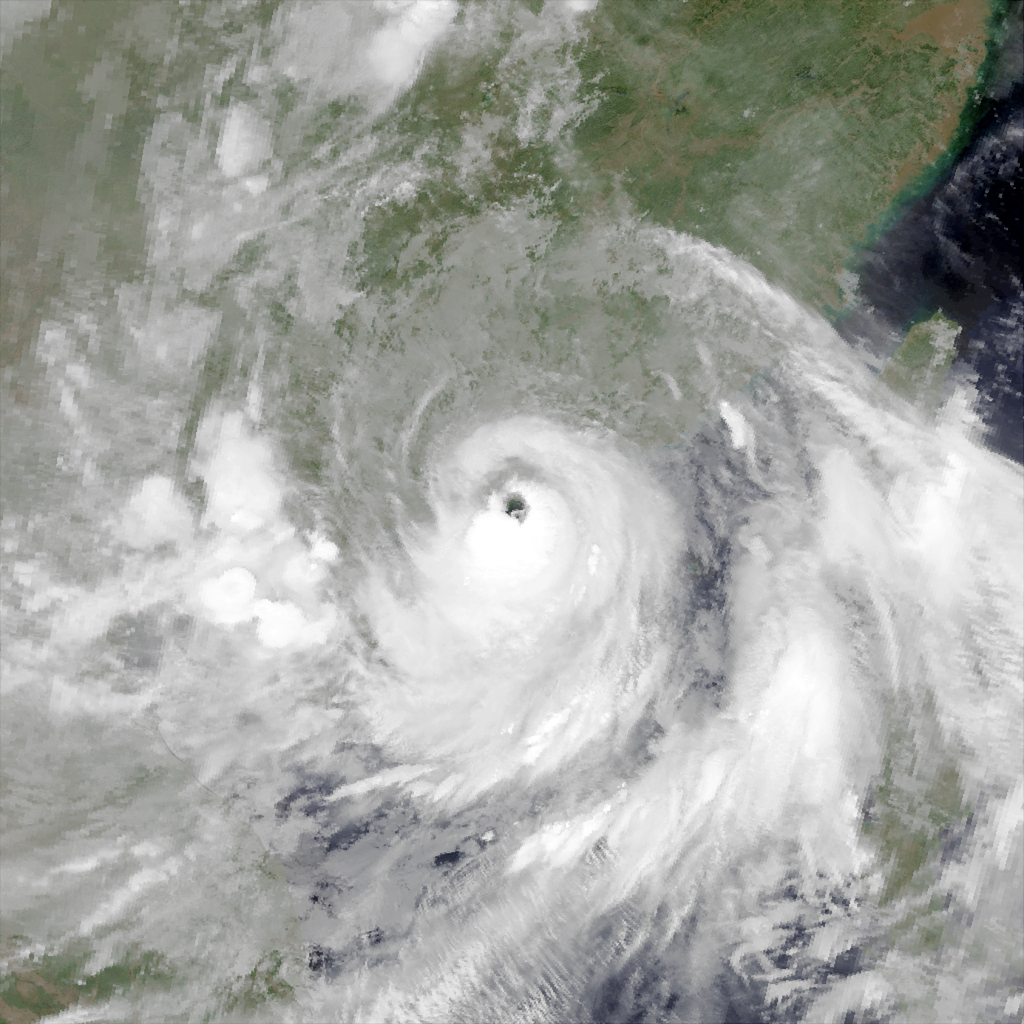
- Vicente approaching Guangdong at peak intensity on July 23

Meteorological history
- Formed: July 18, 2012
- Dissipated: July 25, 2012

Typhoon
- 10-minute sustained (JMA)
- Highest winds: 150 km/h (90 mph)
- Lowest pressure: 950 hPa (mbar); 28.05 inHg

Category 4-equivalent typhoon
- 1-minute sustained (SSHWS/JTWC)
- Highest winds: 215 km/h (130 mph)
- Lowest pressure: 937 hPa (mbar); 27.67 inHg

Overall effects
- Fatalities: 32 total
- Damage: $351 million (2012 USD)
- Areas affected: Philippines, Hong Kong, Macau, South China, Vietnam, Laos
- IBTrACS
- Part of the 2012 Pacific typhoon season

Typhoon Vicente, (Note: The name Vicente (Chamorro: Vicente, [visente]) was contributed by the United States and is a masculine given name in Chamorro.) known in the Philippines as Tropical Depression Ferdie, was the strongest tropical cyclone to strike the Chinese province of Guangdong since Typhoon Hagupit in 2008, and was regarded as the strongest storm to affect Hong Kong and Macau in more than ten years. The eighth named storm and third typhoon of the 2012 Pacific typhoon season, Vicente began as a tropical depression on July 18 northeast of the Philippines.

Vicente soon steadily moved into the South China Sea, and began to intensify over warm sea waters and weak vertical wind shear, and began explosive intensification early on July 23, and started to charge toward the Guangdong region prompting the Hong Kong Observatory (HKO) to issue the Hurricane Signal, No. 10, the first since York in 1999. The Macao Meteorological and Geophysical Bureau also hoisted Signal No. 9 for the first time since York and after the transfer of sovereignty over Macau. Late on the same day, Vicente made landfall over Taishan in Guangdong, China.

The storm caused extensive damage throughout its path. Vicente’s precursor enhanced the southwest monsoon in the Philippines, leading to widespread rain and gusty winds in Luzon and the Visayas. In Hong Kong, 138 people were injured; however, no deaths were reported. Vicente also caused the Hong Kong plastic disaster, which resulted in containers filled with polypropylene pellets falling into and floating on the water. In China, Vicente caused 11 fatalities and significant infrastructural damage. Its remnants later moved into northeastern Vietnam, resulting in flash flooding and multiple landslides. Overall, Vicente caused an estimated US$321 million in damage in China and US$29.9 million in Vietnam.

== Meteorological history ==
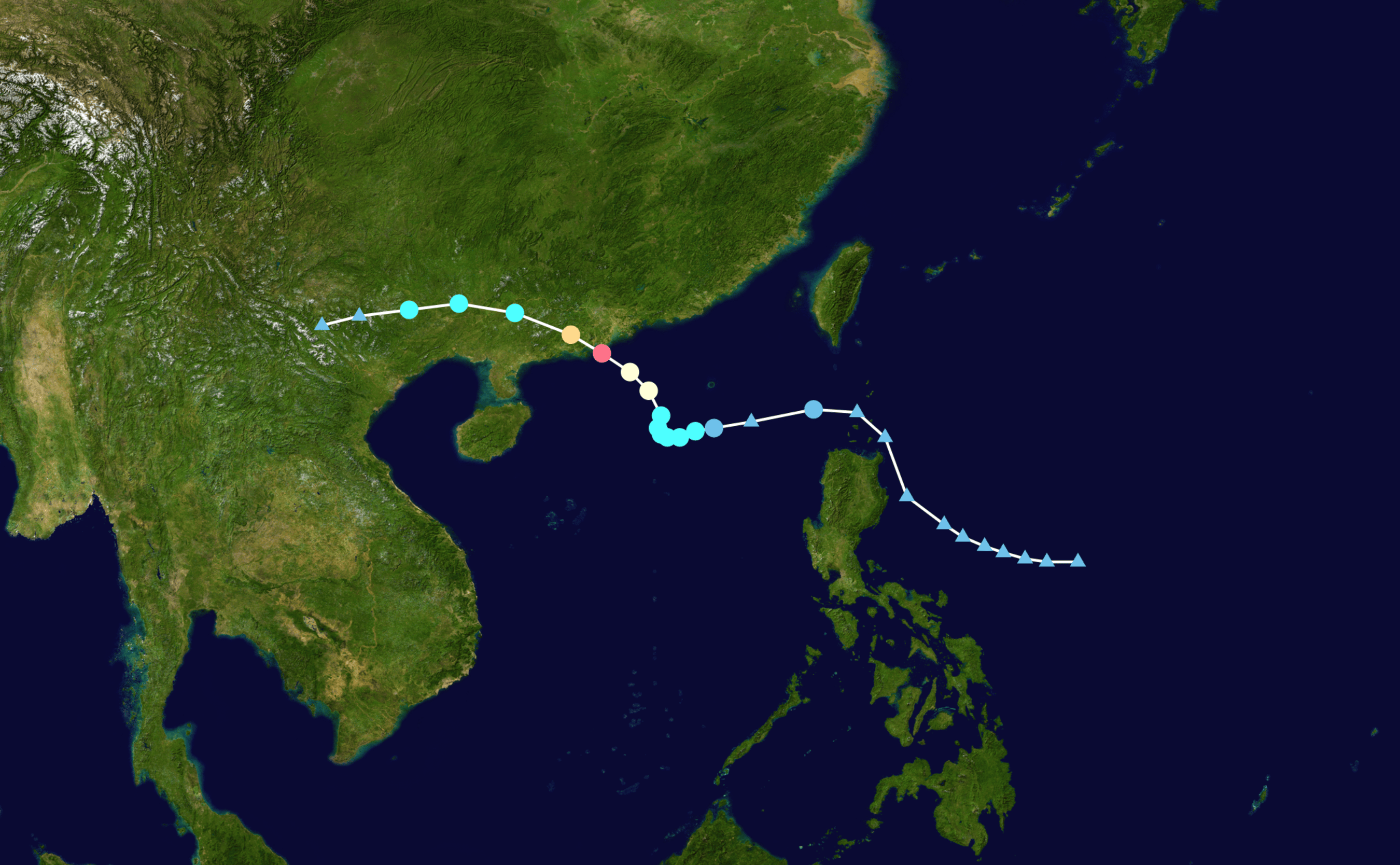
Map plotting the storm's track and intensity, according to the Saffir–Simpson scale Map key Saffir–Simpson scale Tropical depression (≤38 mph, ≤62 km/h) Tropical storm (39–73 mph, 63–118 km/h) Category 1 (74–95 mph, 119–153 km/h) Category 2 (96–110 mph, 154–177 km/h) Category 3 (111–129 mph, 178–208 km/h) Category 4 (130–156 mph, 209–251 km/h) Category 5 (≥157 mph, ≥252 km/h) Unknown Storm type Tropical cyclone Subtropical cyclone Extratropical cyclone, remnant low, tropical disturbance, or monsoon depression

After Khanun became a tropical storm on July 16, its large area of convection associated with a tropical wave in the south began to split, and it was transformed into a tropical disturbance on July 17.Japan Meteorological Agency (JMA) upgraded the system to a tropical depression on July 18. On July 20, the tropical depression became more organized; however, due to moderate vertical wind shear, and dry air coming from the north of the system, the low-level circulation center became exposed, as it developed three multiple circulation centers. Later that day, the JTWC issued a Tropical Cyclone Formation Alert on the system; soon, PAGASA upgraded it to a tropical depression and named it Ferdie. The JTWC also upgraded the system to a tropical depression late on the same day.

After the system moved into the South China Sea on July 21, the JMA upgraded the system to a tropical storm and named it Vicente, while the storm moved out of the Philippine Area of Responsibility. As the system's convection began wrapping around the circulation center, the JTWC upgraded Vicente to a tropical storm late on July 21. On July 22, Vicente slowed down and looped, for the subtropical ridge northeast to the storm suddenly weakened. Late on the same day, the JMA upgraded Vicente to a severe tropical storm. On July 23, because of weak vertical wind shear and high sea surface temperature, Vicente's structure became better organized, and it started to form an eye when it moved towards Guangdong, China, prompting the JTWC upgrading Vicente to a Category 1 typhoon. As system continued to strengthen, it developed a few hot towers, reaching 9.3 mi (15.0 km) high. Soon after, Vicente began a phase of rapid intensification near the Pearl River Delta, leading the JTWC to amend their advisory at 12Z from a Category 1 typhoon to a Category 4 typhoon in six hours, and the JMA upgraded Vicente to a typhoon around the same time. When Vicente was located about 110 kilometres south-southwest of Hong Kong at 16:45 UTC on July 23, the Hong Kong Observatory (HKO) issued the Hurricane Signal, No. 10, the first since York in 1999 and the farthest from Hong Kong on record. Then, Typhoon Vicente made landfall over Taishan, Guangdong, China at 20:15 UTC, 111 kilometers west of Hong Kong, as a Category 4 typhoon with winds of 213 km/h (132 mph). On July 24, Vicente was still holding typhoon strength over land, as a Category 3 typhoon, with winds of 185 km/h (115 mph), as the JMA downgraded Vicente to a severe tropical storm. Later, the JMA downgraded Vicente to a tropical storm, then downgraded it to a tropical depression later that day.

== Preparations and impact ==
=== Philippines ===
The depression caused widespread rains and gusty winds in Luzon and Visayas region due to the enhancement of southwest monsoon. On July 20, classes were suspended from pre-school to high school level due to heavy rain and severe flooding. Some were stranded to their offices and residents were advised to seek in higher ground. About eleven provinces in Luzon were hoisted the signal warnings as the depression crossed extreme northern Luzon. Rainfall exceeding 40 mm/h was recorded under the 400 diameter of the depression. On the same time, Philippine Atmospheric, Geophysical and Astronomical Services Administration released a red warning throughout Metro Manila and nearby provinces as the depression was expected to pour down a 3 - 4pm equivalent rainfall of Typhoon Ketsana of 2009. Classes in tertiary level were cancelled. Airports and seaports were advised to not engage with the weather as zero visibility in air and sea was expected. Gale warnings were also released. At least 2 people died and 6 others were officially missing.

=== Hong Kong ===
On July 21 at 15:40 Hong Kong Time (HKT) (07:40 UTC) after Tropical Depression 09W had come to within 800 km (500 mi) of Hong Kong, the Hong Kong Observatory, issued the Standby Signal Number 1 for the Special Administrative Region. The Standby Signal Number 1 was kept in force for the next 37 hours, before as Vicente started to move towards the Southern China coast, it was replaced with the Strong Wind Signal Number 3 at 05:20 HKT on July 23 (21:20 UTC, July 22). During that day, as the system moved closer to Hong Kong, local winds gradually strengthened and reached gale force offshore and on high ground, before the HKO issued the Northeast Gale or Storm Signal Number 8 at 17:40 HKT (09:40 UTC). Local winds continued to strengthen after the Northeast Gale or Storm Signal No. 8 was issued with gales recorded generally in Hong Kong and were reaching storm force over waters in southern Hong Kong. The Increasing Gale or Storm Signal No. 9 was subsequently hoisted at 23:20 HKT (15:20 UTC), when Vicente was located about 110 km (70 mi) to the south-southwest of Hong Kong, and had just intensified abruptly into a severe typhoon.

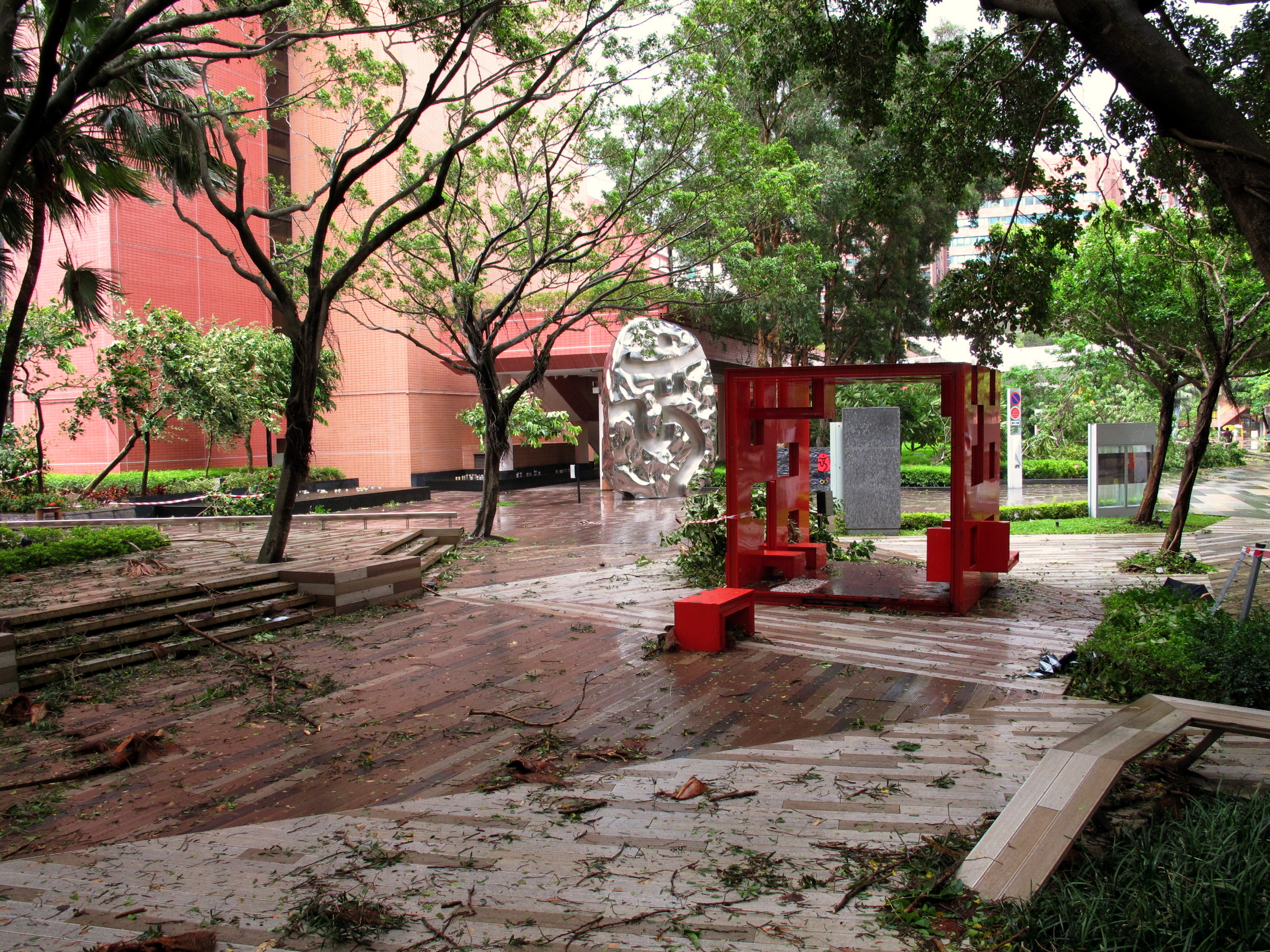
Fallen tree branches and debris in Sha Tin Park, near Sha Tin Centre, Hong Kong

During that night after Signal No. 9 had been issued, Vicente continued to move closer to Hong Kong and its eyewall came close to the south-western part of Hong Kong during the early hours. Local winds also turned and became southeasterly with storm force winds over many places of the Special Administrative Region, reaching hurricane force in the southwestern part of Hong Kong and on high ground. As a result, the HKO issued its highest TC warning signal: the Hurricane Signal Number 10 at 00:45 HKT (16:45 UTC). Typhoon Vicente's centre subsequently passed about 100 km (60 mi) to the southwest of the Hong Kong Observatory Headquarters between 01:00 – 02:00 HKT (17:00 – 18:00 UTC), which marked a direct hit and signifies that Vicente is the farthest TC that necessitated the issuance of Signal No. 10. The 10-minute wind speed of Cheung Chau automatic weather station peaked at 1:25 am with a maximum of 140 km/h. As Vicente moved away and local winds gradually subsided, the Southeast Gale or Storm Signal Number 8 was issued at 03:35 HKT (19:35 UTC) to replace Signal No. 10. The Southeast Gale or Storm Signal Number 8 was then replaced by the Strong Wind Signal No. 3 at 10:10 HKT (02:10 UTC), which allowed business and the Hong Kong Stock Exchange to reopen and trade again. The Signal No. 3 was replaced by Standby Signal No. 1 subsequently at 14:40 HKT (06:40 UTC). Vicente moved further away during the rest of the day and after its circulation was no longer affecting Hong Kong, all tropical cyclone warning signals were cancelled at 23:15 HKT (15:15 UTC). However, a monsoon trough continued to bring strong winds to Hong Kong, thus requiring the issuance of Strong Monsoon Signal immediately afterwards, until 5:20 am on the next day. The weather in Hong Kong remained poor for 3 more days because of Vicente's outer rain bands and the monsoon trough. The Observatory had to issue the Amber Rainstorm Warning Signal several times, until the weather became fine on 28 July.

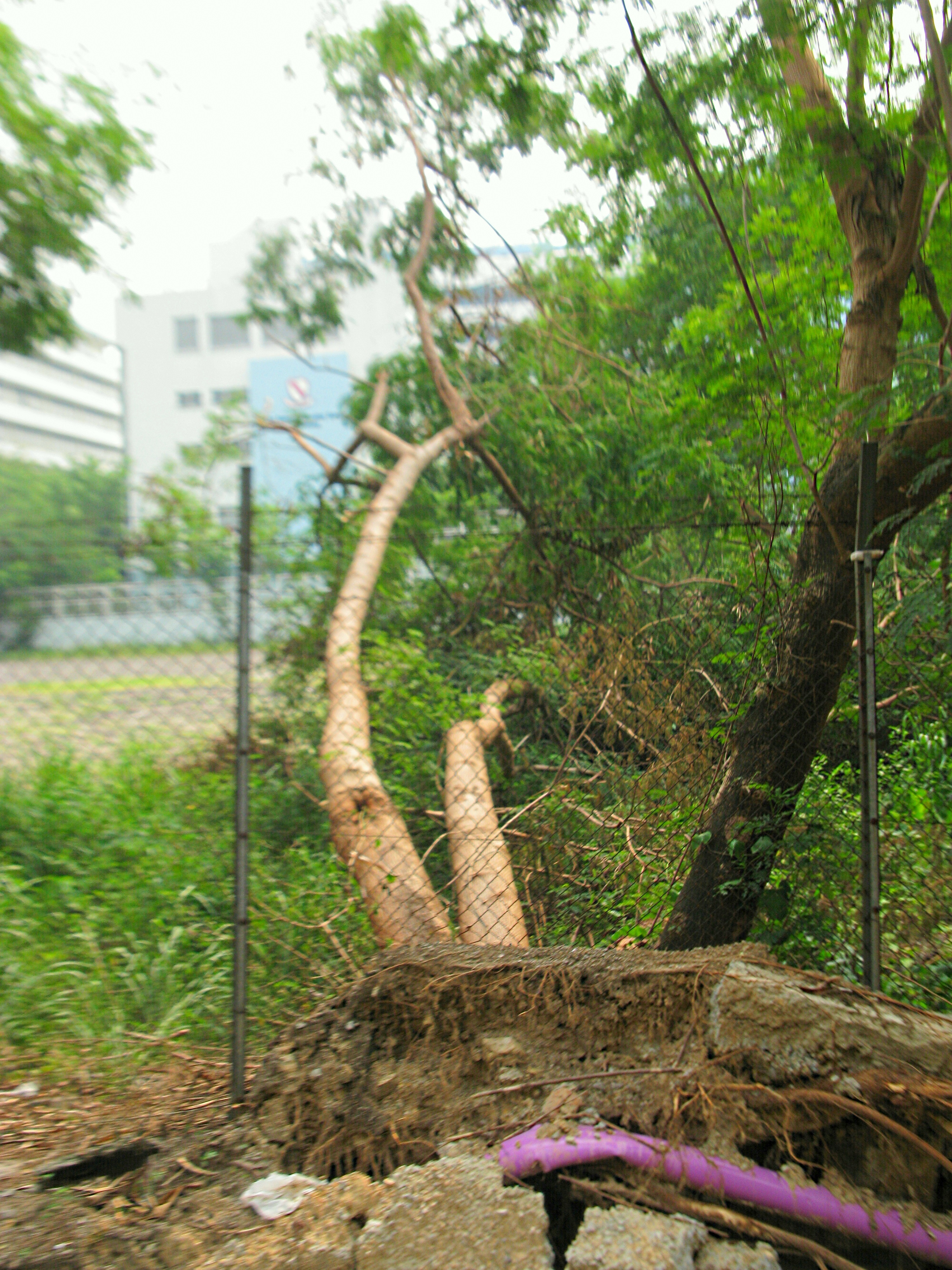
A fallen Leucaena leucocephala tree in Hong Kong, after being battered by Typhoon Vicente.

During July 23 and 24, Typhoon Vicente's rainbands brought heavy squally showers to Hong Kong, during which over 200 mm (7.9 in) of rainfall was recorded over many parts of the territory, while a maximum storm surge of about 1.51 metres (5.0 ft) was recorded at Tsim Bei Tsui. In Hong Kong, at least 138 people were injured during the passage of Vicente. The number of fallen trees amounted to about 8,800. There were two reports of landslip and 7 reports of flooding. Dangerous signboards or fallen scaffoldings were reported in many parts of the territory, resulting in closure of some roads and damage to many vehicles. A wooden board was blown up by strong winds in Connaught Road Central, hitting a number of passers-by and knocking one of them unconscious. During the storm, the East Rail line of the Mass Transit Railway had to halt service because of damage of overhead cables by toppling trees. As a result, hundreds of commuters were forced to spend the night in trains or at the MTR stations. Crops were damaged by flood waters in some farmlands in Sheung Shui. A small craft ran aground in Deep Water Bay and was damaged.

At Hong Kong International Airport, at least 90 flights were cancelled, over 446 flights delayed and 50 flights were diverted on July 23–24.

8,800 trees were destroyed and much debris crashed into downtown streets as people made their way home from work, being told to take shelter. Ferry, bus and train services were suspended or ran at reduced capacity. The ports and schools were closed, and at least 60 passenger flights were cancelled, while more than 270 flights were delayed. The stock exchange was also closed in the morning. Almost 140 injured people sought medical treatment and 268 people took refuge in storm shelters in Hong Kong. Hong Kong local media also reported that more than 100 people stayed in the Tai Wai train station overnight, unable to get home after services were suspended. There were no deaths.

==== Hong Kong plastic disaster ====
The Hong Kong plastic disaster resulted after seven containers fell overboard from a freighter in waters nearby and about 150 tons of plastic pellets drifted over the sea towards Macao or were washed ashore.

=== Macau ===
On July 21 at 18:00 Macao Standard Time (MST) (10:00 UTC) after Vicente had come to within 800 km (495 mi) of Macau, the Macao Meteorological and Geophysical Bureau, issued the Signal No.1 for the Special Administrative Region. Signal No.3 was hoisted at 6:30 am on 23 July in response to the sudden turn of Vicente after a day of stalling. After Vicente intensified into a typhoon and moved further to the north, the Bureau hoisted Signal No. 8 NE at 7:00 pm on the same day. Vicente posed a threat of direct hit with its northwest track, but the Bureau did not consider issuing higher signals until the next day. By then, storm-force winds were all over the region, with 10-minute sustained winds reaching hurricane level on the 3 bridges.

As Vicente started its direct hit on Macau, the Bureau finally announced at 1:12 am on 24 July, that it would switch for a higher signal in 2 to 3 hours. The Bureau hoisted the Signal No. 9 at 2:15 am, which was the first one since Typhoon York in 1999, as well as the first issuance after the transfer of sovereignty over Macau. Vicente skirted at 40 km south-southwest of Macau at 3:00 am, which marked the closest point of approach to the region, and proved that Vicente was closer to Macau than Hong Kong. Despite recording hurricane in the region, as well as Vicente being closer to Macau, Signal No. 10 was not hoisted, which led to controversy along with the late issuance of Signal No. 9. As Vicente made landfall at Taishan, Guangdong, Signal No. 9 lasted for less than 3 hours, and was changed to Signal No. 8 SE at 5:00 am, which was subsequently switched to Signal No. 3 at 9:30 am. All signals were lowered at 4:20 pm on the same day.

=== China ===
Striking Guangdong Province as a severe typhoon, according to China Meteorological Agency, Vicente caused considerable damage in the region. Strong winds from the storm destroyed 500 homes and damaged 13,600 ha (34,000 acres) of crops. Approximately 500,000 people were affected by the storm, of which 75,000 were evacuated and in need of assistance. In Shenzhen, high winds from the typhoon damaged about 115,000 trees, of which 30,000 were downed. Many of these fell on buildings and cars, causing additional damage. According to post-storm surveys, at least 2,770 cars were damaged or destroyed in the city, with losses amounting to ¥13.2 million (US$2.1 million). Eight hundred properties reported storm-related damage with total losses exceeding CNY 50 million yuan (US$7.82 million). Throughout the province, three people were killed and economic losses reached ¥1.08 billion (US$169 million).

Although the storm had weakened considerably by the time it moved into Guangxi Province, heavy rains associated with it triggered damaging floods. A total of 1,886 homes were destroyed and 18,690 ha (46,200 acres) of crops were damaged. Losses throughout the province reached ¥92.1 million (US$14.4 million). In neighboring Guizhou Province heavy rains exacerbated ongoing floods and resulted in four fatalities. More than 400 homes were destroyed, 17,800 ha (44,000 acres) of crops were damaged, and economic losses reached CNY 130 million (US$20.3 million). In all, 11 people were killed in China, and the total economic losses were counted to be ¥2.05 billion (US$321 million).

=== Vietnam ===
The remnants of Typhoon Vicente moved into northeastern Vietnam and caused heavy rain within the area, with various areas recording storm rainfall totals off between 20–363 mm (0.79–14.29 in). This resulted in landslides and significant flash floods within the Red and Thai Binh rivers and landslides. Throughout the country, 21 people were killed and 15 others were left injured. 342 homes were destroyed and 10,436 homes were partially damaged. Total damage were amounted to be 642 billion đồng (US$29.9 million).

== Retirement ==
In 2013, the Typhoon Committee retired the name Vicente from the rotating naming lists due to the same name existing in the Eastern Pacific naming system, and it will never be used again as a typhoon name in this basin. The following year, it was replaced by Lan, which was used for first time during the 2017 season.

== See also ==
- Weather of 2012
- Tropical cyclones in 2012
