= Hong Kong plastic disaster =

Marine pollution event

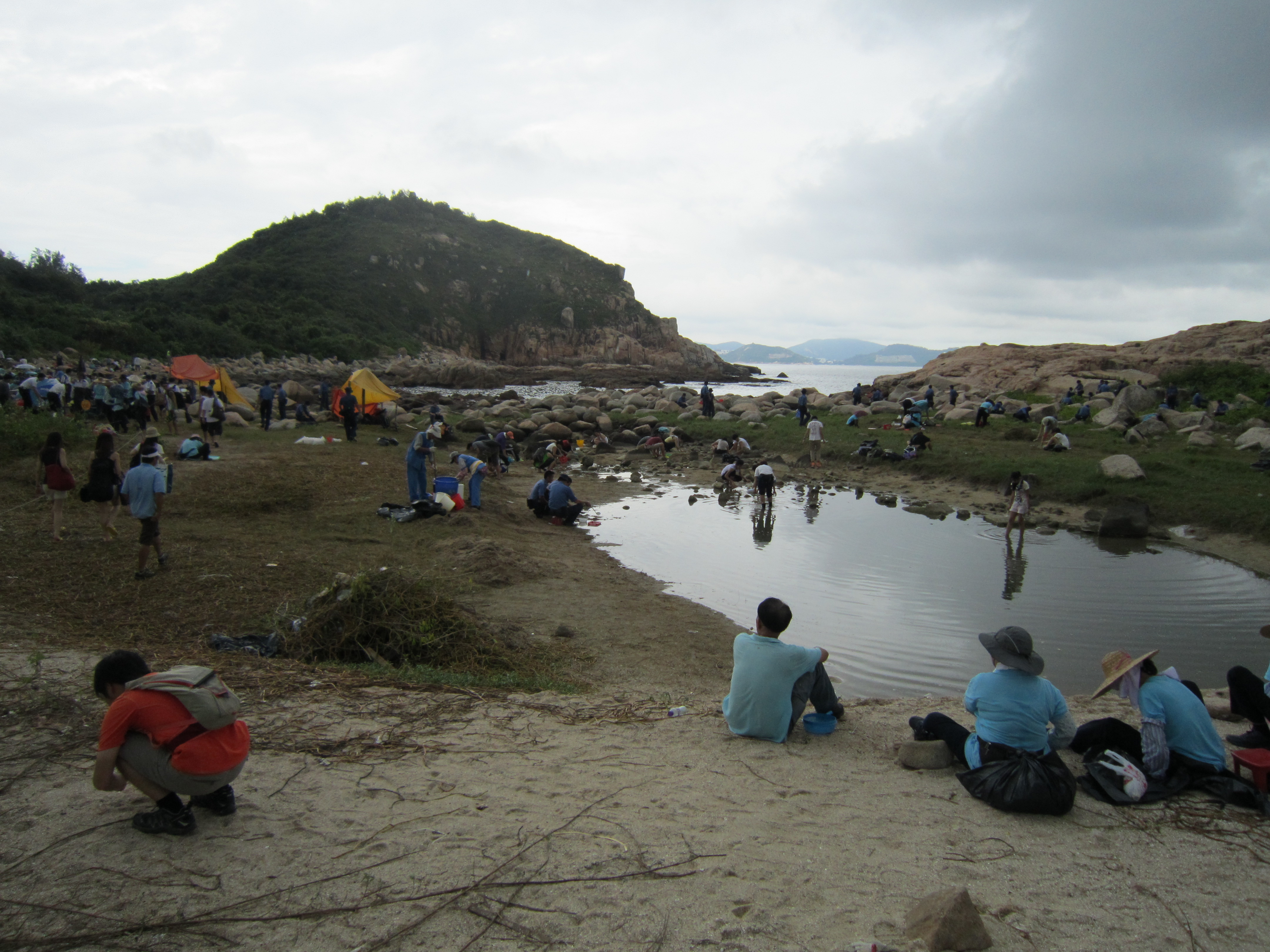
Plastic clean-up action in Shek Pai Wan, Lamma Island, Hong Kong.

The Hong Kong plastic disaster refers to a marine pollution event in adjacent waters of Hong Kong in 2012. Typhoon Vicente hit Hong Kong and its adjacent waters on 23 July 2012, causing seven containers, six of which were loaded with polypropylene pellets produced by China Petroleum & Chemical Corporation (Sinopec), in a container ship of China Shipping Container Lines (CSCL) to fall into and float on the Hong Kong south waters after the storm. Some containers were destroyed by waves, releasing plastic pellets into the ocean, which became marine debris scattering across Hong Kong's south waters and beaches with water flow, resulting in wide environmental and ecological pollution and threatening local fishery.

Plastic pellets were washed up to the shore the day after the storm hit Hong Kong and were first found by members of the NGO, DB Green, of the Discovery Bay. At the beginning, no reports came from the mainstream media. The clean-up was basically led by DB Green, the Sea Shepherd Conservation Society (Hong Kong) and other NGOs, which spread news through social websites and network media. Those news reports gradually raised from public awareness and a number of Hong Kong citizens took clean-up actions on their own initiative.

Nearly a fortnight after the incident, a number of reports began to appear in the Hong Kong media. Departments of the government of Hong Kong, including the Marine Department (MD) and Food and Environmental Hygiene Department cooperated in the clean-up, but the government kept these news from the public until 5 August when Secretaries of bureaus began to explain it to the public. Sinopec, owner of the containers of plastic pellets, as well as CSCL began to work in tandem with the NGOs in the clean-up at the end of July. However, it remained unclear that who should be responsible for the pollution of plastic pellets.

China Petroleum and Chemical Corp said nurdles are not toxic nor hazardous on their own.

== Incident ==
=== Crash of containers and early clean-up ===
Typhoon Vicente swept past the southwest of Hong Kong from the evening of 23 July 2012 until the next morning. Hong Kong Observatory reported hurricane signal No. 10 on the midnight of 24 July. The same night a container ship of CSCL sailed east on the Hong Kong south waters to moor in the open waters of Ninepin Group. During the voyage, seven forty-feet long containers were blown into the sea, six of which were loaded with about 168 tons of polypropylene pellets produced by Sinopec, the other one filled with glass crafts.

Subsequently, CSCL contacted the Marine Department of Hong Kong (MD) and salvage companies to search the lost containers, but the government did not release any information to the public. Tracy Read, a member of DB Green, an environmental organisation in Hong Kong, first found plastic pellets on the northern beach of the Discovery Bay and started the clean-up with Gary Stokes and other members of the Sea Shepherd Conservation Society (Hong Kong). The next day, DB Green got in touch with Sinopec and reported the incident to South China Morning Post and The Standard (Hong Kong), while the Sea Shepherd Conservation Society (Hong Kong) began to call on Hong Kong people to help with clean-ups on the beaches. Sinopec then sent commissioners to patrol the Discovery Bay with DB Green on 27 July and found more plastic pellets in Sam Pak Wan and Nim Shue Wan, which was only reported in few words on the inside page of South China Morning Post. On the other hand, citizens and the Food and Environmental Hygiene Department told the NGOs that plastic pellets were seen in Mui Wo and Peng Chau.

After 28 July, details of the plastic pollution began to be known by NGOs. Sinopec allowed citizens to go to Kwai Tsing Container Terminals to compute the loss of containers in order to estimate the quantity of plastic pellets crashed into the sea. Only at that time did the public learn that there were altogether six containers loaded with plastic pellets falling into the sea, four of which were found in the waters of the east, north and northwest of Lamma Island and the east of Tai A Chau by the MD and CSCL. One and one-fifth containers of plastic pellets were released out of four containers and two containers were still missing. The same day many NGOs together with main media of Hong Kong required relevant reports, but in vain.

From 31 July, more cooperation was seen between NGOs and Sinopec. The Sea Shepherd Conservation Society (Hong Kong) even successfully organised a collaborative conference with representatives of the government, including the Food and Environmental Hygiene Department and MD, higher commissioners of Sinopec and representatives of CSCL involved. After the conference, representatives of the owners of the container ships agreed to pay for the helicopters used by NGOs to inspect and shoot the coast. The Sea Shepherd Conservation Society (Hong Kong) found the fifth container in the southwestern waters of Lo Chau Island, where was then cleaned up by the MD and the Food and Environmental Hygiene Department. In the meantime, plastic pellets were also found in Shek O, Stanley, Sham Wan (Lamma Island), Eastern Cheung Chau, Kwun Yam Wan and Chi Ma Wan in the south of Hong Kong, which was reported by NGOs on the social website Facebook for publicity and coordination.

=== Plastic Pickup – clean-up action enhanced and incident exposed ===
"Plastic Pickup" action on the shore was enhanced in early August with more organisations joining in the nongovernmental clean-ups. Ocean Park Conservation Foundation Hong Kong called upon NGOs to offer assistance and organize clean-up groups on 2 August. The Hong Kong government sent a special team to clean up plastic pellets in the Discovery Bay the next day. Under the pressure of the public, Hong Kong mainstream media eventually put the incident in the front page on 4 August, focusing on how the government withheld information and the possible hazard of the plastic pellets. The exposure of the incident caused strong response from the public. Many Hong Kong citizens went to the beaches to clean up plastic pellets when they were free on weekends. NGOs, such as World Wide Fund for Nature, Lamma Corner, Green Sense, Keyboard Frontline and Hong Kong Society of Herpetology Foundation, organized volunteers to do clean-ups on the beaches. Over one thousand citizens took the initiative to clean up plastic pellets in Shek Pai Wan on 5 August.

After the exposure of the incident, Ko Wing-man, Secretary of the Food and Health Bureau, and Wong Kam-sing, Secretary of the Environment Bureau, took their first meeting with the media on 5 August, explaining the issue. Although low-level departments of the government have been collaborating with NGOs in clean-ups, decision-making departments made an announcement a fortnight after the incident, reminding citizens not to have fishes that might have taken plastic pellets, which received heavy criticism for the delay. Carrie Lam, Chief Secretary for Administration and acting Chief Executive (the Chief Executive of Hong Kong, Leung Chun-ying, was on a holiday outside Hong Kong), convened a cross-department meeting, arranging clean-ups and providing DB Green with free helicopters of the Government Flying Service to patrol the beaches. NGOs distributed the clean-up task through social websites and released the latest relevant information in early August.

The clean-up of plastic pellets was still incomplete. Typhoon Kai-tak hit waters over two hundred-kilometer south to Hong Kong on 16 August, washing up a great number of plastic pellets as well as litters to the shore, leaving the cleaned beaches messed up again. The sixth container with plastic pellets was found outside the harbor of Hei Ling Chau on 7 September. Besides, as the plastic pellets scattering all over the beaches, grass and nooks and crannies in the rocks were difficult to clean with hands, Sinopec and some volunteers used electric generator and vacuum cleaner to improve efficiency. Institute of Space and Earth Information Science of Chinese University of Hong Kong designed a new system to aid the government and NGOs in monitoring water flow to predict the flow of plastic pellets. Some Hong Kong young people even made a plastic pellet cleaner, called Plastic Cleaner No.1, by themselves, which was ordered by Sinopec for the clean-up.

=== Impact on Macao ===
Macao announced on 21 August that some objects suspected to be polypropylene pellets were found at Hac Sa Beach and Cheoc Van Beach on that day and the day before. Although the government said that most of the plastic pellets had been cleaned up on 24 August, the next day citizens encouraged by environmental organisations that called on volunteers via the Internet went to the beaches to pick up plastic pellets, which were weighed half kilogram.

== Fishery, environment and ecology ==
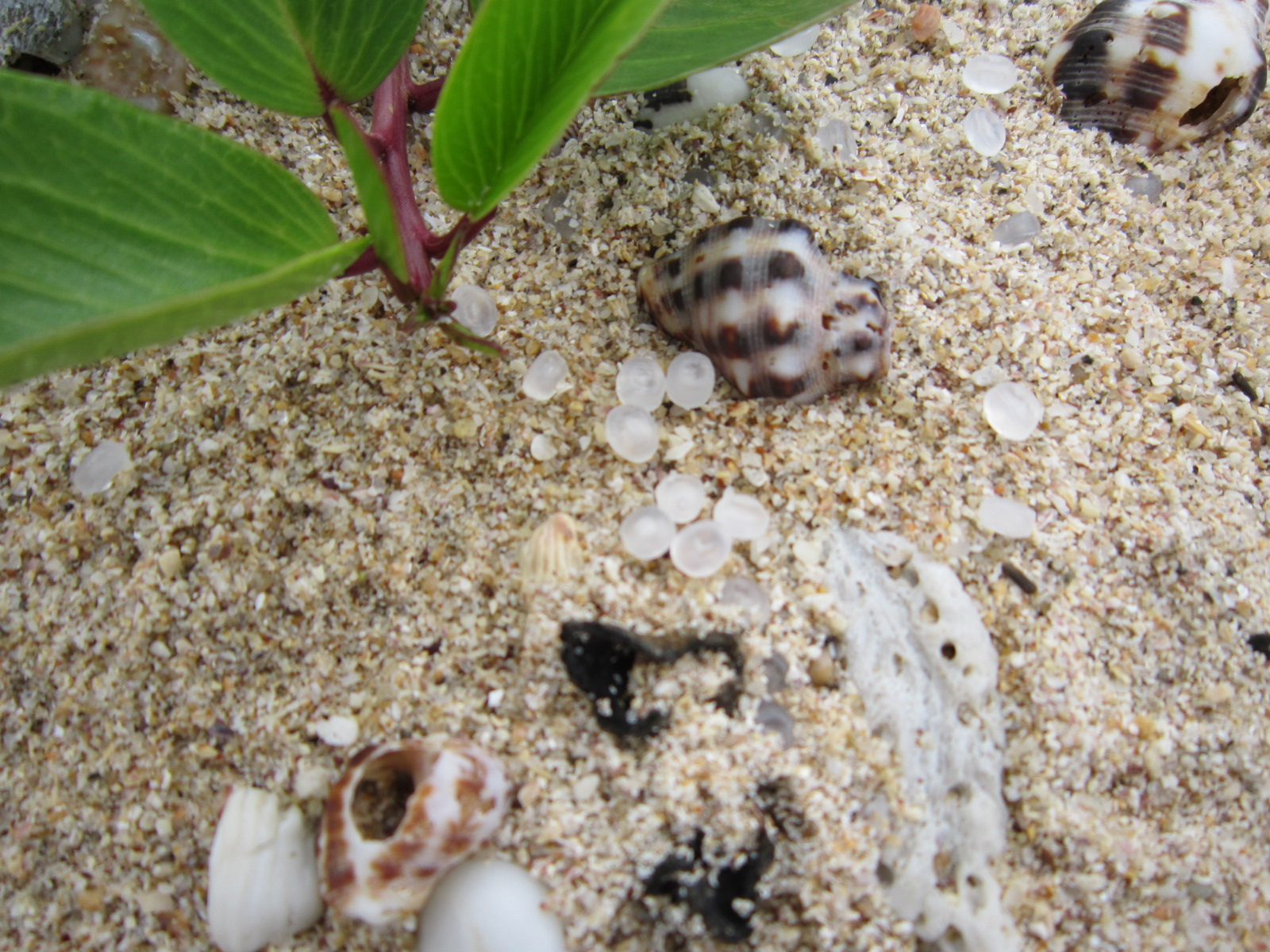
Half a year later, some plastic pellets still remain uncleared in Ngong Chong Beach, Po Toi Island.

The pellets causing Hong Kong's plastic disaster is made of polypropylene, classified No.5 by Resin identification code. The raw material of polypropylene is propene, a pyrolysis product of petroleum. Chemical plants can use a variety of methods to mix propene with other raw materials, which are polymerized to plastics to produce different products, including plastic pellets.

Polypropylene pellets do not have acute toxicity. The polymer, polypropylene, will not leave in the bodies when human beings and fish take plastic pellets. In addition, it is not rare to see plastic rubbish floating on Hong Kong waters and different kinds of plastic pellets are often eaten by fish. The citizens, however, may hardly hear of such things, which accounts for the strong repercussions upon the plastic disaster. After the exposure, distributors once worried that fish eating plastic pellets might have been poisoned and stopped buying local fish. Hong Kong citizens also lost confidence in local fish, which led to a dramatic drop in local fish sales. The fishermen, consequently, suffered a loss.

Polypropylene has been widely used in daily life. Since it is resistant to heat, acid, alkali, chemical substance and collision and hard to biodegrade, it is often made into food containers to extend the expiration date of food, including microwavable food boxes, disposable tableware and goods packages. Whereas according to experience of the Great Pacific Garbage Patch, if the plastics are exposed to solar ultraviolet radiation for a long time, they will gradually be broken down into tiny molecules while still keeping the form of a polymer during the process of photo-degradation and continue floating on the sea. As the plastics are broken down, chemical substances that may be used to make plastics, such as Bisphenol A, will be released to the ocean. Meanwhile, thinner plastics will absorb all the chemical substances on the ocean surface, including carcinogens human beings discharge into the sea, forming a layer of "toxic soup" on the ocean surface. Photo-degraded plastics can be easily absorbed by the digestive system of fish and seabirds. Many toxic chemical substances, therefore, enter the food chain, causing unpredictable disaster to the ecosystem. Larger-volume plastic products may also choke the digestive system of saltwater fish and seabirds, which will then die of malnutrition.

In fact, the plastic pellets in Hong Kong's plastic disaster once covered Sham Wan of Lamma Island, the spawning bed of the endangered marine life, green sea turtles. Tourists are forbidden to go there from June to October every year to avoid any interference during the spawning of the green sea turtles. The plastic disaster occurred right in the spawning months of the green sea turtles and Sham Wan was covered by a foot of plastic pellets for a time.

== See also ==
- List of environmental disasters
- List of environmental issues
- Resin identification code
- Typhoon Vicente
