= Qianhuang, Fujian =

Qianhuang 前黄镇
- Town
- Location in Fujian Qianhuang (China)
- Coordinates: 25.1282°N 118.8660°E
- Country: People's Republic of China
- Province: Fujian
- Prefecture-level city: Quanzhou
- District: Quangang District
- Time zone: UTC+8 (China Standard)

Qianhuang (Chinese: 前黄) is a town in Quangang District, Quanzhou, Fujian, China. As of 2018, it has 13 villages under its administration.
