= Allah Mina =

Coordinates: 25°21′19.7″N 55°12′17.7″E

Allah Mina was a cement barge which sunk in the Persian Gulf in approximately 1972.

The wreck site is now a popular site for scuba divers, in part because of the coral and other marine life attracted to the lime contained in the barge's cargo.
