= Nanpu Town =

Nanpu 南埔镇
- Town
- Location in Fujian
- Coordinates: 25.1902°N 118.9107°E
- Country: People's Republic of China
- Province: Fujian
- Prefecture-level city: Quanzhou
- District: Quangang
- Time zone: UTC+8 (China Standard)

Nanpu (Chinese: 南埔镇; pinyin: Nánbù Zhèn; Pe̍h-ōe-jī: Lâm-po͘-tìn) is a town in the Quangang District of Quanzhou municipality, Fujian.

== Administration ==
The town executive, CPC sub-branch and PSB sub-station (paichusuo, 派出所) are seated in Liucuo.

The town administers 15 village committees:

- Liucuo (柳厝村)
- Shicuo (施厝村)
- Qiucuo (邱厝村)
- Kecuo (柯厝村)
- Xiaocuo (肖厝村)
- Nanpu (南埔村)
- Tianzhu (天竺村)
- Tangtou (塘头村)
- Tianhu (天湖村)
- Fengxiang (凤翔村)
- Xianjing (仙境村)
- Huiyu (惠屿村)
- Xianfeng (先锋村)
- Shage (沙格村)
- Luntou (仑头村)
