= Wengyuan County =

Wengyuan 翁源县 Yungyun
- County
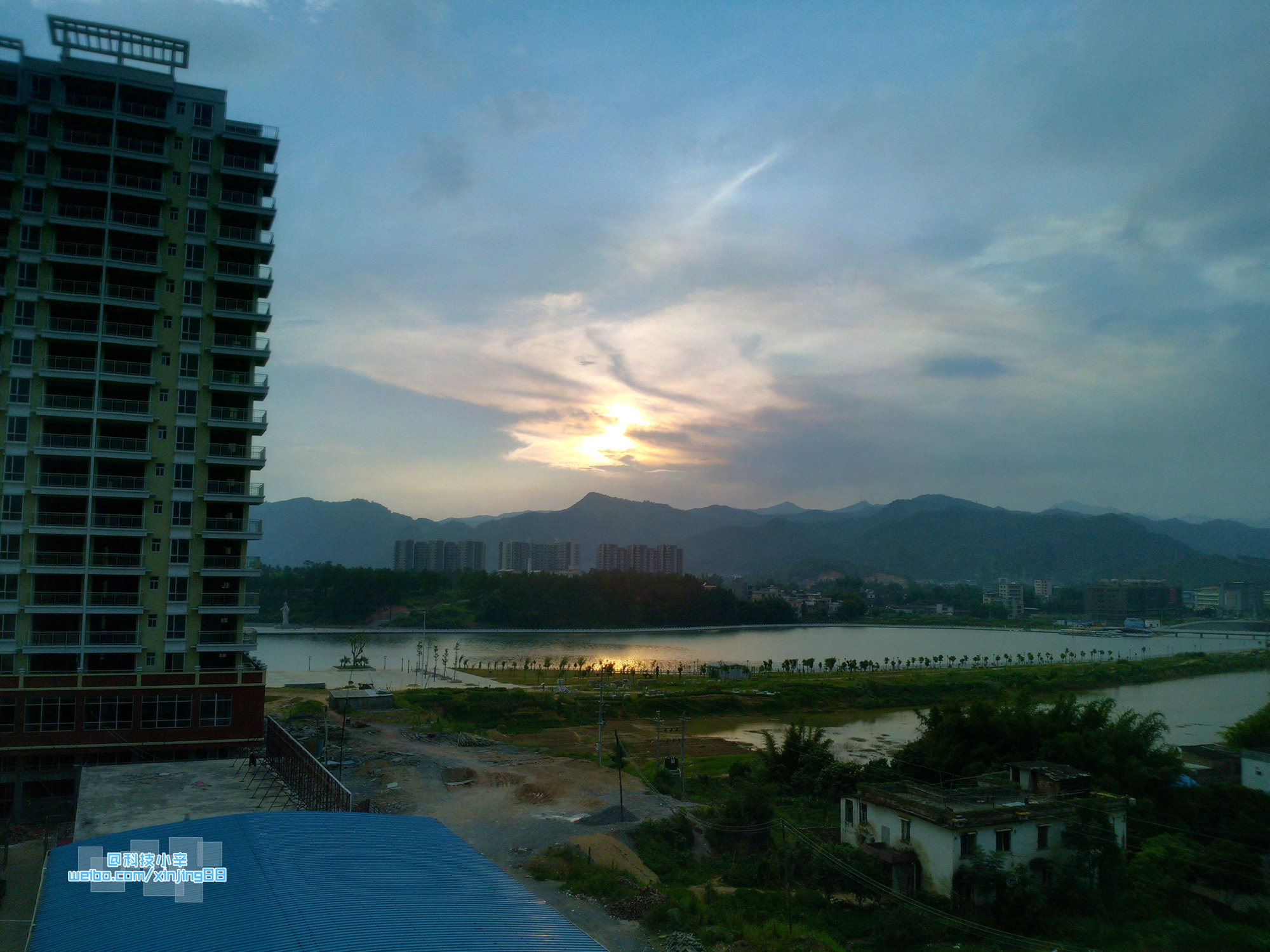

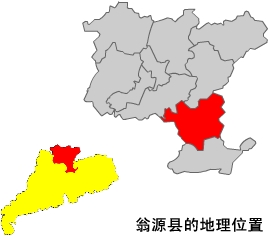
- Location in Shaoguan and Guangdong
- Coordinates: 24°21′01″N 114°07′49″E
- Country: People's Republic of China
- Province: Guangdong
- Prefecture-level city: Shaoguan

Area
  - County: 2,234 km^{2} (863 sq mi)
- Highest elevation (Qixingdun peak (七星墩)): 1,300 m (4,300 ft)
- Lowest elevation (Guangdu town): 100 m (330 ft)

Population (2019)
  - County: 421,756
  - Density: 188.8/km^{2} (489.0/sq mi)
  - Urban: 123,685
  - Rural: 298,071
- Time zone: UTC+8 (China Standard)

Wengyuan (postal: Yungyun; Chinese: 翁源; pinyin: Wēngyuán) is a county in the north of Guangdong Province, China, bordering Jiangxi to the northeast. It is under the administration of Shaoguan City. It has a population of 421,756 in 2019, 99.55% of whom speak Hakka. Yao languages are spoken in some parts of the county. 0.616% of the population belongs to minority ethnic groups, most of them Yao.

The name means 'source of the Weng River', which is a tributary of the Bei River.

Wengyuan is noted for its plum blossoms and orchid floriculture, which account for 70% of China's orchid production.

== Administrative divisions ==
The county is responsible for the administration of eight towns:

Towns

- Longxian (龙仙镇)
- Bazi (坝仔镇)
- Jiangwei (江尾镇)
- Guandu (官渡镇)
- Zhoubei (周陂镇)
- Wengcheng (翁城镇)
- Xinjiang (新江镇)
- Tielong (铁龙镇), formerly known as Tielong Forest Farm (铁龙林场)

== Climate ==
Climate data for Wengyuan, elevation 184 m (604 ft), (1991–2020 normals, extremes 1958–2010)
Month	Jan	Feb	Mar	Apr	May	Jun	Jul	Aug	Sep	Oct	Nov	Dec	Year
Record high °C (°F)	28.3 (82.9)	30.7 (87.3)	33.1 (91.6)	34.1 (93.4)	36.1 (97.0)	38.3 (100.9)	39.5 (103.1)	38.5 (101.3)	38.1 (100.6)	36.7 (98.1)	34.5 (94.1)	29.0 (84.2)	39.5 (103.1)
Mean daily maximum °C (°F)	16.6 (61.9)	18.8 (65.8)	21.3 (70.3)	26.0 (78.8)	29.6 (85.3)	32.2 (90.0)	33.8 (92.8)	33.6 (92.5)	31.8 (89.2)	28.1 (82.6)	23.9 (75.0)	17.9 (64.2)	26.1 (79.0)
Daily mean °C (°F)	11.4 (52.5)	13.5 (56.3)	16.6 (61.9)	21.2 (70.2)	24.8 (76.6)	27.2 (81.0)	28.2 (82.8)	27.8 (82.0)	26.3 (79.3)	22.5 (72.5)	18.4 (65.1)	12.5 (54.5)	20.9 (69.6)
Mean daily minimum °C (°F)	8.0 (46.4)	10.0 (50.0)	13.5 (56.3)	17.7 (63.9)	21.8 (71.2)	24.1 (75.4)	24.6 (76.3)	24.3 (75.7)	22.7 (72.9)	18.6 (65.5)	14.8 (58.6)	9.0 (48.2)	17.4 (63.4)
Record low °C (°F)	−2.1 (28.2)	−0.6 (30.9)	−0.8 (30.6)	6.8 (44.2)	11.5 (52.7)	15.6 (60.1)	19.8 (67.6)	21.1 (70.0)	14.3 (57.7)	6.6 (43.9)	1.2 (34.2)	−2.3 (27.9)	−2.3 (27.9)
Average precipitation mm (inches)	67.0 (2.64)	81.9 (3.22)	163.9 (6.45)	227.3 (8.95)	273.4 (10.76)	323.4 (12.73)	171.0 (6.73)	181.0 (7.13)	126.1 (4.96)	38.8 (1.53)	47.2 (1.86)	47.1 (1.85)	1,748.1 (68.81)
Average precipitation days (≥ 0.1 mm)	9.3	11.0	17.4	17.2	18.7	19.0	16.0	16.2	11.5	5.3	6.8	6.9	155.3
Average snowy days	0.3	0.1	0	0	0	0	0	0	0	0	0	0.1	0.5
Average relative humidity (%)	72	76	80	81	81	83	79	80	77	70	71	69	77
Mean monthly sunshine hours	100.6	81.2	67.5	83.4	116.3	134.3	198.0	185.4	171.2	173.7	147.4	137.3	1,596.3
Percentage possible sunshine	30	25	18	22	28	33	48	47	47	49	45	42	36
Source: China Meteorological AdministrationPeriod of record start
