= Padcal tailings spills of August-September 2012 =

Mining disaster in Benguet, Philippines

The Padcal tailings spills of August–September 2012 were a series of mine tailings spills from Tailings Pond 3 of the Philex Mining Corporation's Padcal mine in Benguet Province, Philippines. The incident began on August 1, 2012, with a massive release on the order of 5 million tonnes or 3 million cubic meters of water and tailings from a breached drainage tunnel (Penstock A) in the pond. The effluent flowed into the Balog River down to Agno River and San Roque Dam. At least four more major discharges were reported: on August 4, 11 and 30, and September 13. The total weight of solids discharged is given by Advocates of Science and Technology for the People, citing a Mines and Geosciences Bureau Report dated September 17, 2012, as 21 million tonnes. The Center for Science in Public Participation gives the volume discharged, for an incident that they date as August 2, but likely refers to the whole August–September series, as 13 million cubic meters. The spill was ten times larger than the 1996 Marcopper mining disaster, making it the country's biggest mining disaster by volume of toxic tailings.

The following excerpt from the Advocates of Science and Technology for the People describes the August 1 event:

The first TP3 spill on August 1, 2012, left a huge crater with an estimated radius of 30 kilometers. According to reports, the leakage released around 9.9 million metric tonnes (MMT) of sediments which is equivalent to a volume of 12 operational months. The spill covered 2.5 km long and 15 feet wide of Itogon's Balog River with a thickness of 2-8 feet.

The Environmental Management Bureau (EMB) of the Cordillera Autonomous Region (EMB-CAR) estimated the volume of tailings discharged from August 1–14 at 6 MMT, while the Mines and Geosciences Bureau (MGB) pegged the discharge at 5 MMT. Based on the Summary and Recommendation on Mill Tailings Fee and Liabilities of Philex (MGB Report dated ept 17, 2012), the total weight of solids discharged is 20,689,179.42 dry MT. (AGHAM and others, 2013, pp 2-3.)

The company tried to plug the initial (August 1) breach with various large objects but was unsuccessful.

The Philippines Department of Environment and Natural Resources issued a statement on August 4, 2012, that it had suspended operation of the mine on August 2, and that the mine operator had stopped the leak.

The effluent smothered marine life in the Balog River, rendering it "practically biologically dead," according to the report by the Advocates of Science and Technology for the People and others. Cobalt, copper, zinc, and arsenic contamination exceeded permitted levels.
