= Fujian Quangang Carbon Nine leakage event =

2018 environmental disaster in Fujian, China

The Fujian Quangang Carbon 9 Leakage Event was a carbon nine leakage event that occurred in Quangang District, Fujian Province, China. A polyunsaturated aliphatic hydrocarbon mixture (called "Pyrolysed Carbon Nine" in the petrochemical industry) leaked while Donggang Petrochemical Industry Co., Ltd. was loading oil at about 1 a.m. on November 4, 2018.

== History ==
On November 4, 2018, Fujian Donggang Petrochemical Industry Co., Ltd. carried out oil loading and unloading. However, the hose flange gaskets of the tanker were damaged due to aging, resulting in carbon nine leaking into the environment. The company immediately invoked its emergency plan. According to Quangang District Environmental Protection Bureau, 6.97 tons of carbon nine escaped.

At two o'clock in the morning, people felt discomfort and dizziness, some fishermen were hospitalized. Contaminants flew into the sea, killing many cultured fish.

After the incident, the sale of aquatic products were suspended and the nearby salt field was closed.

On November 8, the Quangang District Environmental Protection Bureau issued an announcement stating that the atmospheric indicators have returned to normal and continue to improve.
