= Fengwei =

Town in Fujian Province, China

Fengwei 峰尾镇
- Town
- Location in Fujian
- Coordinates: 25.1177°N 118.9501°E
- Country: People's Republic of China
- Province: Fujian
- Prefecture-level city: Quanzhou
- District: Quangang
- Time zone: UTC+8 (China Standard)

Fengwei (simplified Chinese: 峰尾镇; traditional Chinese: 峰尾鎮; pinyin: Fēngwěi Zhèn; Pe̍h-ōe-jī: Phang-bóe Tìn) is a town in the Quangang District of Quanzhou City, Fujian, China. It is situated on a peninsula in Meizhou Bay, jutting southeast toward the bay's entrance.

The town oversees eight villages:

- Chengfeng Village (诚峰村)
- Chengping Village (诚平村)
- Qianting Village (前亭村)
- Zhengrong Village (峥嵘村)
- Guocuo Village (郭厝村)
- Shanglou Village (上楼村)
- Lianyan Village (联岩村)
- Kuibi Village (奎壁村)
