= Tuling =

Tuling 涂岭镇
- Town
- Location in Fujian
- Coordinates: 25.1767°N 118.8449°E
- Country: People's Republic of China
- Province: Fujian
- Prefecture-level city: Quanzhou
- District: Quangang
- Time zone: UTC+8 (China Standard)

Tuling (Chinese: 涂岭镇; pinyin: Tulǐng Zhèn; Pe̍h-ōe-jī: Tô͘-léng-tìn) is a town in the Quangang District of Fujian's Quanzhou Municipal Region.

== Administration ==
The town executive, Chinese Communist Party sub-branch and public security bureau sub-station (paichusuo) are in Tuling Village.

The town administers 21 Village committees:

- Tuling Village (涂岭村)
- Xiuxi Village (秀溪村)
- Xitou Village (溪头村)
- Baitong Village (白潼村)
- Qingmei Village (清美村)
- Xialu Village (下炉村)
- Shishang Village (世上村)
- Wenyang Village (汶阳村)
- Lupu Village (芦朴村)
- Song Yuan Village (松园村)
- Xiaoba Village (小坝村)
- Qian'ou Village (前欧村)
- Lukou Village (路口村)
- Qiuhou Village (邱后村)
- Yiban Village (驿坂村)
- Wushe Village (五社村)
- Xixi Village (溪西村)
- Tuxing Village (土型村)
- Zhangjiao Village (樟脚村)
- Zhaihou Village (寨后村)
- Huangtian Village (黄田村)
