= Quangang, Quanzhou =

Quangang 泉港区
- District
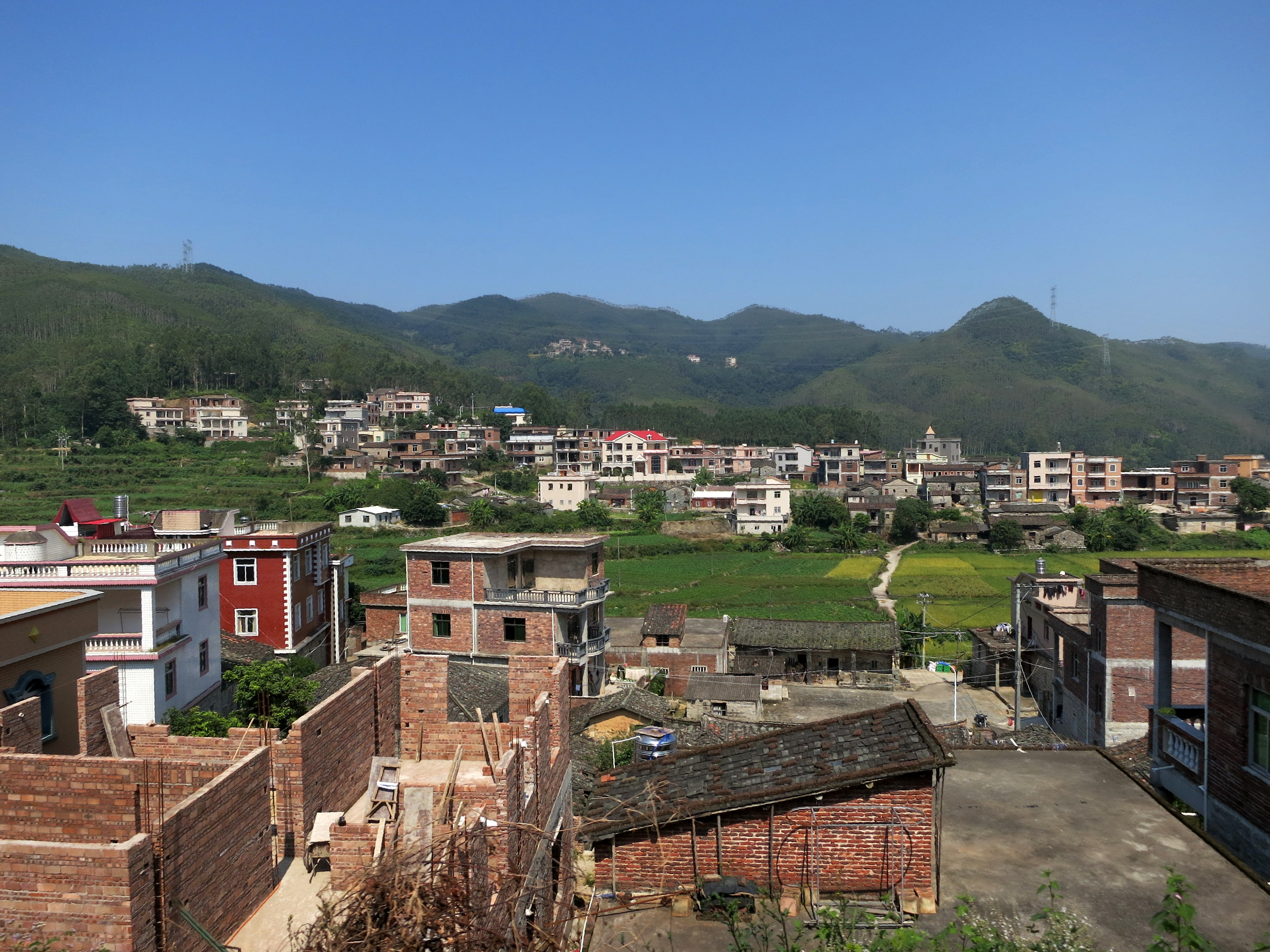

- Location in Fujian
- Coordinates: 25°07′05″N 118°41′18″E
- Country: People's Republic of China
- Province: Fujian
- Prefecture-level city: Quanzhou

Area
  - Total: 299.4 km^{2} (115.6 sq mi)

Population (2020 census)
  - Total: 354,296
  - Density: 1,183/km^{2} (3,065/sq mi)
- Time zone: UTC+8 (China Standard)

Quangang (Chinese: 泉港; pinyin: Quángǎng; Min Nan: Chôan-káng) is a district of Quanzhou, Fujian province, People's Republic of China. Before 1996 it was part of Hui'an County. In 2000, it separated itself from Hui'an, and was renamed Quangang. The population is 354,296 (2020 census). The majority is Han, with some minority population, e.g. Hui and Mongol. The post code is 362114.

The district government locates in Shanyao street.

== Administration ==
The district is divided into seven town governments:

- Nanpu (南埔镇)
- Qianhuang (前黄镇)
- Fengwei (峰尾镇)
- Houlong (后龙镇)
- Jieshan (界山镇)
- Shanyao (山腰街道)
- Tuling (涂岭镇)

== See also ==
- Fujian Quangang Carbon Nine leakage event
