= MV Sea Star =

Coordinates: 25°18′N 57°34′E

Sea Star was a supertanker from South Korea that spilled some 115,000 tons of crude oil into the Gulf of Oman on December 19, 1972, after colliding with the Brazilian tanker Horta Barbosa. After the collision both vessels caught fire and were abandoned by their crews. Twelve of the crew members died in the fire, which burned for five days. Recovery of Sea Star was attempted before the fires on board were extinguished, but following several explosions the vessel sank in the Gulf of Oman on December 19, 1972.

The first ship on the scene was the United States Navy destroyer USS Charles R. Ware (DD-865). The crew of Charles R. Ware fought the fires on Horta Barbosa and picked up about 26 crewmen from Sea Star, most of whom were taken to Bahrain for medical assistance and repatriation.
