= Governorship of Mitt Romney =

Mitt Romney's tenure as the 70th governor of Massachusetts

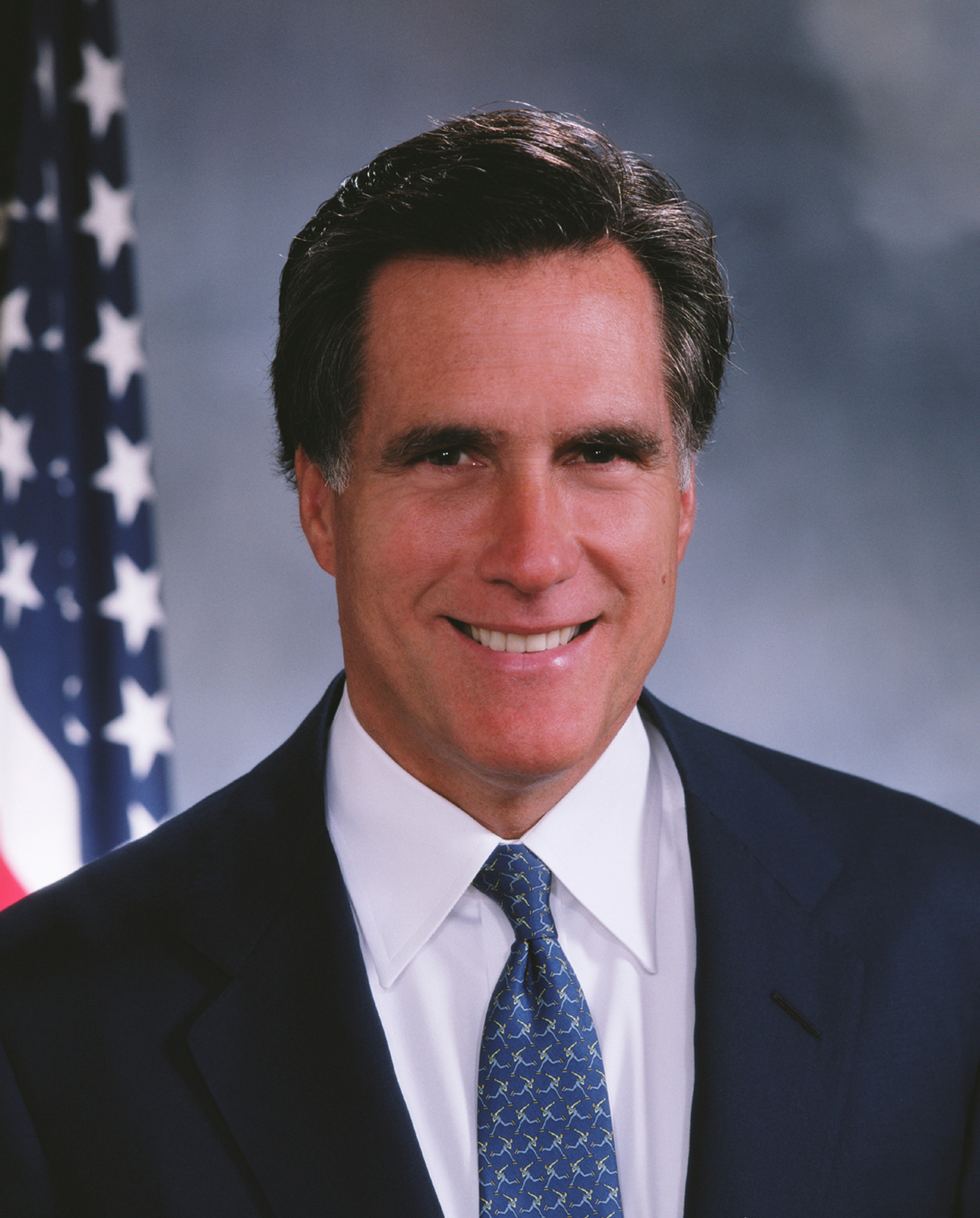
- Governorship of Mitt Romney; January 2, 2003 – January 4, 2007
- Governor: Mitt Romney
- Party: Republican
- Election: 2002

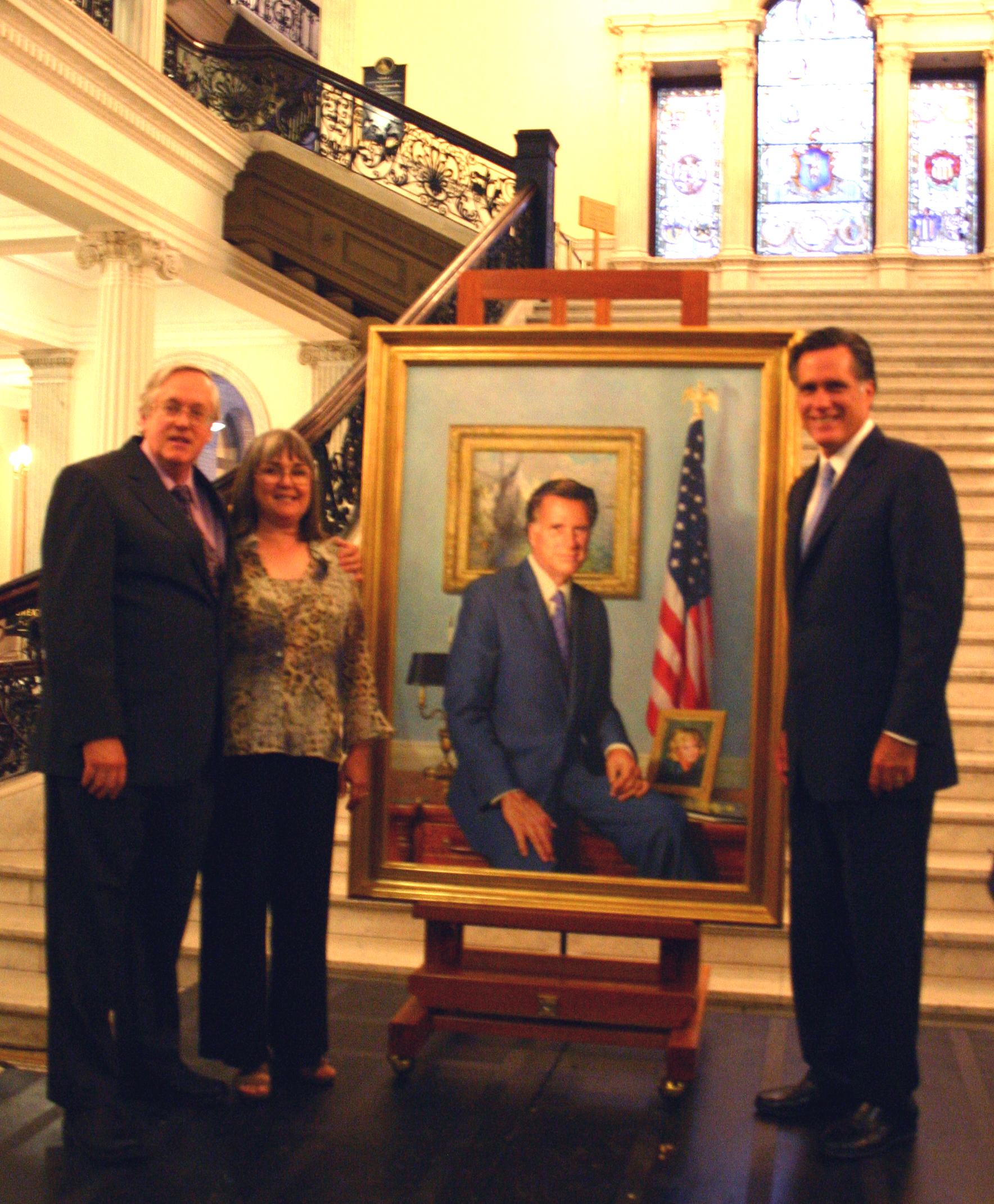
Romney and artist Richard Whitney at the June 2009 unveiling of Romney's official portrait in the Massachusetts State House.

Mitt Romney was sworn in as the 70th governor of Massachusetts on January 2, 2003, along with Lieutenant Governor Kerry Healey. Romney's term ended on January 4, 2007; he chose not to run for re-election.

== Inauguration ==
Romney's swearing in as governor used the same Bible that his father George Romney had used when he was sworn in as the Governor of Michigan. In his 15-minute inauguration speech in the Massachusetts House of Representatives, he avoided policy specifics, but said that he intended to bring about a "lighter, more agile bureaucracy." The overall inauguration festivities took place over three days and emphasized themes around common citizens.

Upon taking office, Romney faced a state legislature in which Democrats held 85 percent of the seats. Indeed, the state Republican Party had fielded no candidate for 62 percent of the seats during the 2002 state elections.

From the outset Romney sought to show himself as the state's first 'CEO governor'. His choices for the executive cabinet included well-known figures such as Democrat Robert Pozen, former vice chairman of Fidelity Investments, and Douglas Foy, who had served as president of the Conservation Law Foundation. They and other cabinet members and advisors were picked more on managerial abilities rather than on party affiliation. Romney gave them broad authority over new what he called "super-secretariats".

Romney and Healey both pledged to forgo their official salaries for the length of their terms.

== Fiscal policy ==
=== Background ===
During the campaign for the governorship in 2002, Romney proposed a plan that he said would balance the Massachusetts budget without raising taxes. He campaigned that he would be able to save $1 billion (out of a $23 billion budget) by reducing waste, fraud, and mismanagement in the state government, and he railed against the large tax increase that the legislature were negotiating in an attempt to close a looming $2 billion budget deficit. He promised that if elected he would repeal that tax increase within four years without cutting core government services. Surveys suggested that many residents agreed with his antitax stance. Though less than a majority, some 40 percent of the voters voted in favor of abolishing the income tax in a referendum held during the election that carried Romney into office; and in an April 2003 poll of Massachusetts residents, 57 percent said Romney should not consider raising taxes as part of his plan to balance the budget.

Upon entering office, Romney found that the emergency spending cuts and tax increase that the legislature had enacted under his predecessor, Jane Swift, months earlier had proven insufficient. He faced an immediate budget shortfall for the current fiscal year estimated to be between $450 million and $650 million, and a deficit for the following year initially projected to be $3 billion, although outside analysts and the state Department of Revenue said that that projection was too high, as it was based, they said, on faulty revenue predictions.

=== Emergency budget cuts ===
Massachusetts law required that all state budgets be balanced, and the current fiscal year was already more than halfway over when Romney assumed office (Massachusetts' fiscal year begins July 1 of the preceding calendar year). To close the deficit, he asked for, and was granted by the state legislature, emergency powers (under the existing Section "9C" authority in state law) to make unilateral cuts in the fiscal year 2003 budget.

Romney's initial emergency budget proposal for the fiscal year 2003 called for $343 million in immediate funding cuts, necessitating layoffs of state employees and cuts in aid to cities and towns for public safety and education. He explained in a televised address, "There's no time to restructure state government or remake state programs. On such an emergency timetable, there's just time for cuts." He also proposed cuts in state expenditures for Medicaid, the government program providing health care for the poorest state residents. The cuts included caps in payments to medical providers (one example being through limiting payments for hospital stays to 20 days, no matter how sick the patient), increased stringency of the criteria for Medicaid eligibility, and rationing of access to higher-priced medications for Medicaid patients. Some 36,000 Massachusetts residents lost their Medicaid eligibility. The 2003 emergency budget revision proposal also included funding cuts affecting public colleges and universities, treatment for schizophrenic and other mentally ill patients, and various other social services.

=== Cuts in funding to local communities ===
Romney's austerity budget for the fiscal year 2004, unveiled just weeks later, included even more substantial cuts in state funding for cities and towns. The final budget passed by the legislature (after overriding Romney's attempt to make still further cuts using line-item vetoes), cut funding for local aid to many communities by as much as 20 percent. Already struggling to absorb funding cuts from the prior year's budget, communities across the state were forced to cut services and hike fees, while laying off teachers, police officers, and other municipal workers.

To compensate for lost revenue from the state government, communities raised local property tax rates, helping drive up the average residential property tax bill by 22 percent over the course of Romney's tenure. In response to complaints about the high residential property taxes, Romney supported and signed into law legislation that allowed communities to shift some of the burden of rising property taxes from residential property owners onto business owners. He also expressed approval for state tax law changes that would permit communities to raise local sales taxes and fees if the local voters agreed.

As with the 2003 emergency revision budget, Medicaid funding, which was responsible for more than one-fourth of all state spending and which had been growing rapidly, was targeted for cuts in the 2004 budget. In addition to proposing reductions in payments to hospitals and nursing homes for care of Medicaid patients, and restrictions on Medicaid patients' access to prescription drugs and eligibility for nursing homes admission, Romney proposed that the low-income Medicaid patients be charged monthly fees for participation in the program, along with co-payments for visits to doctors' offices. The 2004 budget also incorporated further cuts in funding for higher education. Public colleges and universities responded to funding cuts during Romney's tenure by raising mandatory fees 63 percent. Most other areas of state government were budgeted to receive approximately 5 percent less funding on average.

=== Government restructuring plans ===
Romney's budget proposals included savings he anticipated achieving by restructuring the state government. On announcing his 2004 budget proposal, he said that through improving efficiency by reorganizing the state bureaucracy, along with reducing waste and fraud, he would save $2 billion. Democratic legislators and independent analysts called that estimate vastly overdrawn. The Massachusetts Taxpayer Foundation, a nonpartisan, business-funded organization that monitors state finances, suggested the figure might have been closer to $100 million, and Romney himself was eventually forced to concede that the $2 billion figure could not be reached without new revenue.

The budget proposed requiring state workers to make larger contributions toward the cost of the health insurance they received as an employee benefit. An attempt to persuade the legislature to relax state rules to allow for the outsourcing of state services to private contractors was rebuffed. However, Romney was more successful with efforts to reorganize and consolidate some of the agencies of the state executive branch (such as Health & Human Services), trimming the ranks of state government workers by 2,000 to 3,000 workers with the 2004 budget. Another example of his government restructuring efforts was his plan to reduce state expenditures on legal proceedings by revamping the court system, cutting the numbers of state-employed attorneys, and refusing to increase state payments to attorneys who accepted cases of defendants too poor to afford private attorneys (Massachusetts' court-appointed attorneys were being paid some of the lowest hourly rates in the nation). Romney vetoed a funding bill for payment of attorneys representing the poor, declaring that it was more important for the state to balance its books than to pay attorneys, and that the attorneys should provide the services pro bono. The cuts in payments for representation of the indigent provoked outraged attorneys to strike. The plan to remake the court system was unsuccessful.

=== Fee increases ===
In addition to spending cuts, Romney and the legislature relied heavily on fee increases to help balance the budgets throughout Romney's term, more aggressively pursuing a revenue source that the legislature had already begun to draw upon to close a deep deficit during the year prior to Romney's election. The state of Massachusetts raised $500 million in new revenue during Romney's first year in office from fees, more than any other state surveyed. Romney proposed 33 new fees along with increases in 57 existing fees, resulting in higher costs for birth certificates, new car purchases, driver's learning permits, firearms permits, professional licenses, and billboards advertising, as well as for many state services. He also increased a state gasoline fee originally intended for cleanup of contamination around underground fuel storage tanks. The two cents per gallon increase made for a total effective state gasoline tax of 23.5 cents per gallon, generating about $60 million per year in additional revenue (surpluses of $40 million over the costs of the cleanup program). Opponents said many of the fees posed a hardship on those who could least afford them, such as fees for the state to provide certification of blindness and a photo identification card for the blind. The proposal also called for a $50 fee for tuberculosis tests and a $400 fee for those who tested positive (the tuberculosis fees were rejected by the legislature).

Critics, including some conservatives, complained that Romney was using these fees increases as a tax increase in disguise after having promised he would not raise taxes. Romney said that the fees were distinct from taxes because fees were charged for particular services provided whereas taxes were assessed more broadly, without expectation of any specific services — although critics noted that this explanation applied to only some of the fees Romney proposed.

=== Business tax collection increases ===
Having vowed not to raise taxes, Romney found he could not completely close the budget deficits by cutting spending and raising fees alone. He sought additional revenue by pursuing changes in the business tax code to prevent businesses from evading payment of taxes. Businesses called these changes tax increases, but Romney defended them as the elimination of "loopholes." Examples of specific changes and 'loophole' closures included blocking corporations from transferring intellectual property assets to shell companies in states with lower corporate tax rates, preventing banks and some corporations from avoiding taxes through paper restructurings, eliminating tax breaks for direct mail advertising, and taxing sales of software downloaded over the internet (which had previously gone untaxed) the same as identical software purchased in brick-and-mortar stores. The Romney administration even sought an exemption to avoid having to comply with a federal law passed in 2004 that mandated that states like Massachusetts lower their corporate tax rates.

Romney's fee increases generated an estimated $350–375 million per year in additional revenue for the state, and the business tax "loophole closures" brought in another $350–375 million per year.

=== Attempts to cut taxes ===
The additional revenue from the tax increase that had been enacted prior to Romney's taking office (and which Romney had opposed during his campaign for the governorship) reduced the deficit, previously projected to be $3 billion, by $1.3 billion. Unanticipated federal funds reduced the budget gap further still; and in combination with funding cuts, fee increases, collection of more business tax revenue, and reliance on funds in the state's "rainy day fund" (more formally known as the Stabilization Fund), Romney and the legislature were able to balance the 2004 budget.

Reflecting on his administration's response to the fiscal crisis, Romney would declare, "We have successfully closed the largest deficit in our state's history without raising taxes." Some have called that statement disingenuous, citing the large increases in fees and business tax revenues Romney had produced, as well as the increases in fees and taxes levied by local governments in response to Romney's policies.

Romney stated that Massachusetts finished fiscal 2004 with a $700 million surplus. Official state figures said that fiscal 2005 finished with a $594.4 million surplus. For fiscal 2006, the surplus was $720.9 million according to official figures. The state's "rainy day fund", more formally known as the Stabilization Fund, was replenished through government consolidation and reform. At the close of fiscal year 2006, the fund enjoyed a $2.155 billion balance.

As the state's fiscal outlook improved, Romney repeatedly, and unsuccessfully, urged the legislature to reduce the state income tax from a flat rate of 5.3 percent to 5.0 percent. (In 2000, voters had approved a gradual reduction in the income tax from 5.85 to 5.0 percent; but as an emergency measure in response to the fiscal crisis, the legislature had halted the rollback at 5.3 percent in 2002.) He also proposed a "tax-free shopping day", a property tax relief for Seniors, and a manufacturing tax credit.

The combined state and local tax burden in Massachusetts increased during Romney's governorship. According to an analysis by the Tax Foundation, from 2002 to 2006 the average rate of state and local taxes in Massachusetts rose from 9.6 percent to 10.2 percent (compared to the national rate, which rose from 9.5 percent to 9.7 percent).

=== Transition to Patrick administration & legacy ===
In 2006, the Massachusetts legislature approved a budget for fiscal year 2007 that required spending $450 million from the rainy day fund. Even though the state had collected a record-breaking amount of tax revenue in the fiscal year, the funds were needed to cover the increased spending. Romney vetoed the transfer of funds from the contingency account. The veto was overturned by the legislature, and indeed for the 2006 budget, all 250 line-item vetoes were overturned, and for the entire year of 2006, all of Romney's vetoes of legislative bills were subsequently overturned by the Massachusetts Legislature. In November 2006, Romney then used his emergency budget-revision authority to cut the $450 million from the budget, saying: "One of the primary responsibilities of government is keeping the books balanced. The problem here is not revenues; the problem is overspending. The level of spending which we're looking at would put us on the same road to financial crisis and ruin that our commonwealth has been down before." Later, he restored some of that amount.

Upon leaving office in January 2007 (the middle of fiscal year 2007), Romney argued that he had left the state with a large budget surplus, after he cut hundreds of millions of dollars of programs. However, upon taking office, successor Governor Deval Patrick said there would be a $1 billion deficit for fiscal 2008 if existing service levels were carried over into the next year's budget. At the same time, Patrick restored $384 million in the emergency budgetary authority spending cuts for fiscal 2007 that Romney had made. The budget for fiscal 2008 that Patrick submitted in February 2007 included $515 million in spending cuts and $295 million in new corporate taxes. As it happened, fiscal 2007 ended with a $307.1 million deficit and fiscal 2008 ended with a $495.2 million deficit.

Romney later said, while campaigning for the presidency, "we didn't just slow the rate of growth of our government, we actually cut it." However, by most measures, state government spending increased in Massachusetts during Romney's governorship.

For his fiscal policies, Romney received a C in 2004 and a C in 2006 from the Cato Institute, a libertarian think tank, in their biennial Fiscal Policy Report Card on America's Governors.

== Unemployment and new jobs creation ==
Romney's term as governor fell during a respite between two nationwide economic recessions. When he took office in early 2003, the nation as a whole was still suffering the effects of the early 2000s recession. Massachusetts was losing manufacturing jobs, and, with an economy heavily dependent on the technology sector, had been badly shaken by the dot-com bubble collapse. When the national economy eventually began to improve, the state lagged behind the rest of the nation in job growth and employment.

Job growth in Massachusetts rose at a rate of 1.5 percent (compared to the national average of 5.3 percent), placing Massachusetts 47th of the 50 states in new job creation over the course of Romney's term. The annual rate of job growth was improving by his last year in office, moving Massachusetts up from last place nationally to 28th.

Economists note that governors generally have relatively little impact on their states' employment numbers, good or bad, as these are dominated by forces beyond their control. The statewide health care reforms that Romney helped enact, and signed into law in April 2006, exemplified the state's national leadership role in that industry; overall, there was a 7.6 percent increase in job growth in healthcare and social assistance positions during Romney's term, the strongest growth during that time of any sector. Romney also personally intervened to help attract to the state, or maintain within the state, several large employers, such as Bristol-Myers Squibb and the Gillette division of Procter & Gamble. However, some business leaders said Romney's policies that increased fees and corporate tax revenue drove up business costs and may have weakened job growth.

On average, unemployment rates were slightly worse in the rest of the nation than in Massachusetts for the first three years of Romney's term. By his final year in office, the state was struggling to keep pace with the rate of falling unemployment nationwide. Massachusetts' national ranking leapt from the 29th highest in unemployment when Romney took office to the 18th by the end of his term.

Unemployment in Massachusetts rose during Romney's first year from a rate of 5.6 percent in January 2003, when he took office, to a peak of 6.0 percent in mid-2003. It then steadily declined over the remainder of his term, ending at 4.6 percent in January 2007, his last month as governor, for a net improvement in unemployment of 1.0 percent. Much of the improvement in unemployment during Romney's first three years in office reflected the loss of working-age adults from the labor force, many of them having left Massachusetts for other states during the period. Massachusetts experienced one of the highest levels of net out-migration of any state during Romney's term.

== Health care ==
Romney was at the forefront of a movement to bring near-universal health insurance coverage to the state, after a business executive told him at the start of his term that doing so would be the best way he could help people and after the federal government, due to the rules of Medicaid funding, threatened to cut $385 million in those payments to Massachusetts if the state did not reduce the number of uninsured recipients of health care services. Despite not having campaigned on the idea of universal health insurance, Romney decided that because people without insurance still received expensive health care, the money spent by the state for such care could be better used to subsidize insurance for the poor. After positing that any measure adopted not raise taxes and not resemble the previous decade's failed "Hillarycare" proposal, Romney formed a team that beginning in late 2004 came up with a set of proposals more innovative than an incremental one from the Massachusetts Senate and more acceptable to him than one from the Massachusetts House of Representatives that incorporated a new payroll tax. In particular, Romney successfully pushed for incorporating an individual mandate at the state level. U.S. Senator from Massachusetts Edward M. Kennedy, who had made universal health coverage his life's work, gave Romney's plan a positive reception, which encouraged Democratic legislators to work with it. The effort eventually gained the support of all major stakeholders within the state, and Romney helped break a logjam between rival Democratic leaders in the legislature.

On April 12, 2006, Romney signed legislation that mandates that nearly all Massachusetts residents buy or obtain health insurance coverage or face a penalty (up to approximately $2000 for 2008 or equal to half of the lowest cost premium offered) in the form of an additional income tax assessment. The bill established a regulatory authority called the Commonwealth Health Insurance Connector Authority to implement the law and establish insurance standards. For residents below certain income thresholds and without adequate employer insurance, state subsidies were established, by using funds previously designated to compensate for the health costs of the uninsured. Legislation, effective on July 1, 2007, requires health insurance for all state residents, provided a plan is available to the individual that is deemed affordable according to Commonwealth Health Insurance Connector Authority. In Massachusetts, a roughly $800 million fund known as the "uncompensated care pool" was used to partially reimburse hospitals for expenses related to treating uninsured patients. The fund's revenue comes from an annual assessment on employers, insurance providers and hospitals, plus contributions of state and federal tax dollars. Governor Romney's plan redirects money from this fund to subsidize health insurance costs for low-income residents of Massachusetts. The Romney Administration consulted with Massachusetts Institute of Technology professor Jonathan Gruber to study the state's population and health care needs. They determined that there was enough money in the "free care pool" to implement the Governor's plans, but that it would require more people to buy health insurance at full price in order to pay into the subsidized fund.

The legislature amended Romney's plan, adding a Medicaid expansion for children and imposing an assessment on firms with 11 or more workers who do not offer health coverage. The assessment is intended to equalize the contributions to the free care pool from employers that offer and do not offer coverage. The General Court also rejected Romney's provision allowing high-deductible health plans.

Romney vetoed eight sections of the health care legislation, including a $295-per-person fee on businesses with 11 employees or more that do not provide health insurance. Romney also vetoed provisions providing dental and eyeglass benefits to poor residents on the Medicaid program, and providing health coverage to senior and disabled legal immigrants not eligible for federal Medicaid. However, the state legislature overrode all of the vetoes.

Romney said of the measure overall, "There really wasn't Republican or Democrat in this. People ask me if this is conservative or liberal, and my answer is yes. It's liberal in the sense that we're getting our citizens health insurance. It's conservative in that we're not getting a government takeover." The law was the first of its kind in the nation and became the signature achievement of Romney's term in office. When Romney's official portrait was made for the Massachusetts State House, the composition included a leather binder with a medical seal representing the healthcare legislation.

(Within four years, the law had achieved its primary goal of extending coverage: in 2010, 98.1 percent of state residents had coverage, compared to a national average of 83.3 percent. Among children and seniors the 2010 coverage rate was even higher, at 99.8 percent and 99.6 percent respectively.)

== Education ==
During the 2002 campaign, Romney had proposed to institute full-day kindergarten in schools that were performing below standards and to introduce merit pay to teachers.

As governor, Romney proposed $8 billion in bonds be authorized in order to empty the waiting list for school building projects. Instead, the legislature authorized only $1 billion in bonds and allocated the rest from sales tax receipts.

In 2004, Romney and the legislature established and funded a program to reward the top 25 percent of Massachusetts high school students with a four-year, tuition-free scholarship to the state's public universities or colleges. He has also drafted other education reforms, including the recruitment of 1,000 skilled math and science instructors, bonuses of as much as $15,000 a year for top-performing teachers, and new intervention programs for failing schools. Romney's plan would allow state governments to take control of underperforming schools after three years instead of the six-year period that is now in place. Regarding the achievement gap in public education, Romney has said, "I really believe that the failure of our urban schools and, in some cases our suburban schools, to help minority students achieve the levels that are necessary for success in the workplace is the civil rights issue of our time." Romney has also advocated for a nationwide focus on education to close the "excellence gap with the rest of the world". As governor, Romney proposed mandatory parental preparation courses. He also supported English immersion classes for students that cannot speak English and opposed bilingual education.

During his 2002 campaign, Romney had said he backed age-appropriate, comprehensive sex education in public schools. In 2005, against the will of the state legislature, he introduced federally funded abstinence-only education programs developed by a subsidiary of a Christian anti-abortion organization into some public schools. Romney said that adoption of the programs would be voluntary for individual school districts and that the programs would supplement rather than replace existing comprehensive sex education curricula. Opponents argued that funding pressure would lead to schools dropping comprehensive sex education programs for the freely available abstinence-only ones, which under federal law were required to teach that any sexual activity outside of marriage is likely to have harmful psychological and physical effects, and which were prohibited from discussing the potential benefits of contraception.

During Romney's tenure as governor, Massachusetts' per capita funding for public higher education decreased from $158 to $137, and in national rank, per capita state expenditures changed from 48th to 47th. In July 2005, Romney proposed $200 million in funding for University of Massachusetts capital projects. The governor's capital budget included $50 million earmarked to repair the crumbling parking garage and foundation of the UMass Boston campus. The Massachusetts legislature declined to vote on the bond bill needed to fund the projects. Romney also vetoed a retroactive pay raise for unionized employees of state and community colleges. Romney voiced his opposition to retroactive pay increases for public employees although the raises had previously been agreed to then vetoed by his predecessor.

Romney successfully pressured William Bulger to resign as president of the University of Massachusetts (UMass) on September 1, 2003. Bulger said that his resignation was the result of "a calculated political assault" on him, largely by the governor. William Bulger came under pressure from Romney and others to resign after he invoked his Fifth Amendment right not to testify when he was subpoenaed by a Congressional committee to testify about his brother, James J. "Whitey" Bulger, one of the FBI Ten Most Wanted Fugitives. Romney, who had called for Bulger's resignation and the elimination of the UMass presidency as a cost-cutting move, denied that he had been personally targeting the former state senate president. "The decision was not a political calculation or a personal one," Romney said in February 2003, after unveiling his plan to eliminate the president's job. The Governor's aides stressed that he had not been personally targeting Bulger, saying such interpretations of Romney's actions were cynical. "I think everybody should be taken at their word," spokesman Eric Fehrnstrom said.

On September 5, 2006, Romney denounced Harvard University of Cambridge, Massachusetts for inviting former Iranian President Mohammed Khatami to speak at the school. Romney ordered all state agencies to boycott the visit by refusing to provide state police escorts and other service typically given to former heads of state.

== Same-sex marriage ==
When he ran for governor in 2002, Romney declared his opposition to same-sex marriage. "Call me old fashioned, but I don't support gay marriage nor do I support civil union," said Romney in an October 2002 gubernatorial debate. He also voiced support for basic domestic partnership benefits for gay couples. Romney won the endorsement of the Log Cabin Club of Massachusetts, a Republican gay-rights group, who in 2005 accused him of reneging on his 2002 campaign commitment to support some benefits for gay couples. He also opposed an amendment, then before the General Court, that would have banned same-sex marriage and outlawed all domestic partnership benefits for gay couples. When campaigning in 2002, Romney's stated position was that "All citizens deserve equal rights, regardless of their sexual orientation. While he does not support gay marriage, Mitt Romney believes domestic partnership status should be recognized in a way that includes the potential for health benefits and rights of survivorship."

Romney strongly opposed same-sex marriage during his governorship. He emphasized his desire to "protect the institution of marriage" while denouncing discrimination against gays and lesbians. "Like me, the great majority of Americans wish both to preserve the traditional definition of marriage and to oppose bias and intolerance directed towards gays and lesbians," Romney said in 2004.

On June 2, 2006, Romney sent a letter to each member of the U.S. Senate urging them to vote in favor of the Marriage Protection Amendment. In the letter, Romney stated that the debate over same-sex unions is not a discussion about "tolerance", but rather a "debate about the purpose of the institution of marriage". Romney wrote, "Attaching the word marriage to the association of same-sex individuals mistakenly presumes that marriage is principally a matter of adult benefits and adult rights. In fact, marriage is principally about the nurturing and development of children. And the successful development of children is critical to the preservation and success of our nation."

Romney's letter was his second effort to persuade the U.S. Senate to pass the Defense of Marriage Amendment. On June 22, 2004 he testified before the U.S. Senate Judiciary Committee, urging its members to protect the definition of marriage. "Marriage is not an evolving paradigm," said Romney, "but is a fundamental and universal social institution that bears a real and substantial relation to the public health, safety, morals, and general welfare of all of the people of Massachusetts."

Romney attempted to block implementation of the decision of the Massachusetts Supreme Judicial Court that legalized same-sex marriage in 2003. Romney criticized the decision as harming the rights of children:

They viewed marriage as an institution principally designed for adults. Adults are who they saw. Adults stood before them in the courtroom. And so they thought of adult rights, equal rights for adults ... Marriage is also for children. In fact, marriage is principally for the nurturing and development of children. The children of America have the right to have a father and a mother.

In 2004, the Massachusetts General Court addressed the issue of gay marriage before the implementation of the Goodridge decision. During a constitutional convention, the predominantly Democratic legislature approved an amendment that would have banned gay marriage and established civil unions. An initial amendment offered by House Speaker Thomas Finnernan to merely ban gay marriage without a provision for civil unions was narrowly defeated. The compromise amendment needed to be approved in a second constitutional convention to be held a year later before it could appear on a state election ballot. The amendment was voted down in the subsequent convention and never appeared on a ballot put before voters of Massachusetts.

Romney reluctantly backed the compromise amendment, viewing it as the only feasible way to ban gay marriage in Massachusetts. "If the question is, 'Do you support gay marriage or civil unions?' I'd say neither," Romney said of the amendment. "If they said you have to have one or the other, that Massachusetts is going to have one or the other, then I'd rather have civil unions than gay marriage. But I'd rather have neither."

In June 2005, Romney abandoned his support for the compromise amendment, stating that the amendment confused voters who oppose both gay marriage and civil unions. The amendment was defeated in the General Court (legislature) in 2005 when both supporters of same-sex marriage and opponents of civil unions voted against it. In June 2005, Romney endorsed a petition effort led by the Coalition for Marriage & Family that would ban gay marriage and make no provisions for civil unions. Backed by the signatures of 170,000 Massachusetts residents the new amendment was certified as a valid referendum on September 7, 2005 by Massachusetts Attorney General Thomas Reilly. The measure needs the approval of fifty legislators in two consecutive sessions of the Massachusetts General Court to be placed on the ballot. The Massachusetts legislature however declined to vote on the initiative in two consecutive sessions held on July 12, 2006 and November 9, 2006. Romney responded by joining former Boston Mayor Raymond Flynn and eight others to file a complaint with the state's Supreme Judicial Court to force the legislature to vote on the proposed amendment. The petition also asked the court to instruct the Massachusetts Secretary of State to place the referendum on the 2008 ballot if the legislature failed to vote on the amendment by January 2, 2007.

On the first day that same-sex marriages came into effect in Massachusetts, May 17, 2004, Romney instructed town clerks not to issue marriage licenses to out-of-state gay couples, except for those announcing their intention to relocate to the Commonwealth by requiring the enforcement of the "1913 law" (General Legislation, Part II, Title III, Chapter. 207 (Certain Marriages Prohibited), Sections 11, 12, & 13), which prohibits non-residents from marrying in Massachusetts if the marriage would be void in their home state. The law had not been enforced for several decades. Some legal experts have argued that the original purpose of the legislation was to block interracial marriages and have noted that the law was enacted due to a public scandal over Jack Johnson's interracial marriages. Massachusetts Attorney General Thomas Reilly has stated that there in no evidence to support that claim. Those who agree with him claim that the law is meant to respect the laws of other states and has not been enforced simply because there was not reason. Some towns and their clerks said they would ignore the old ordinance, but the state Attorney General's office said they must obey it.

The Massachusetts legislature in 1913 passed the three laws denying marriage rights to persons domiciled out-of-state who came to Massachusetts to circumvent their own states' anti-miscegenation marriage laws. Romney was criticized for reviving a Jim Crow era piece of legislation that had avoided being nullified by the U.S. Supreme Court's 1967 Loving v. Virginia decision due to it not saying anything about race. However, in March 2006, the Massachusetts Supreme Judicial Court declared the statute legal under the state's constitution. Romney declared the "ruling is an important victory for traditional marriage". He also stated, "It would have been wrong for the Supreme Judicial Court to impose its mistaken view of marriage on the rest of the country. The continuing threat of the judicial redefinition of marriage, here and in several other states, is why I believe that the best and most reliable way to preserve the institution of marriage is to pass an amendment to the U.S. Constitution."

Romney subsequently released a statement in support of a proposed amendment to the Massachusetts state constitution defining marriage as existing only between "one man and one woman" in order to overrule the court's decision. His statement said, "the people of Massachusetts should not be excluded from a decision as fundamental to our society as the definition of marriage."

While consistently rejected same-sex marriage, there was a rhetorical shift in other emphasis around this subject during his time as governor, culminating with Romney rarely talking about protecting gays from bias and instead characterizing himself as a conservative stalwart in the battle against same-sex marriage and in support of heterosexual families.

== Law and order ==
=== Gun control ===
During his 2002 gubernatorial campaign, Romney had been a supporter of the federal assault weapons ban, and had also said he believed "in the rights of those who hunt to responsibly own and use firearms." On July 1, 2004, Romney signed a permanent state ban on assault weapons, saying at the signing ceremony for the new law, "Deadly assault weapons have no place in Massachusetts. These guns are not made for recreation or self-defense. They are instruments of destruction with the sole purpose of hunting down and killing people." The law extended a temporary measure that had been in effect since 1998 and covered weapons such as the AK-47, Uzi, and MAC-10. The same law also modified some other aspects of general firearms licensing regulations.

=== Massachusetts Governor's Task Force on Hate Crimes ===
The Massachusetts Governor's Task Force on Hate Crimes was an agency created by Governor William Weld, coordinating representatives of the state police and local law enforcement agencies with community advocates to further efforts to prevent and prosecute bias-motivated crime in Massachusetts. The Task Force was given permanent status by Weld's successor, Governor Paul Cellucci in 1998. In 2003 Romney vetoed a bill funding hate crimes prevention, after which he impounded money previously approved by his predecessor, Governor Jane Swift, for a bullying prevention program. The anti-bullying program attracted the ire of right-wing Christian activists. Romney's actions against the Task Force preceded his efforts to dismantle same-sex marriage, which was legalized in Massachusetts in 2004 by the Massachusetts Supreme Judicial Court.

=== Death penalty ===
In December 2004, Romney announced plans to file a death penalty bill in early 2005. The bill, filed April 28, 2005, sought to reinstate the death penalty in cases that include terrorism, the assassination of law enforcement officials and multiple killings. Romney's legislation required the presence of scientific evidence such as DNA to sentence someone to death and a tougher standard of "no doubt" of guilt for juries to sentence defendants. This differs from the "beyond a reasonable doubt" standard used in traditional criminal cases. The legislation called for a pool of certified capital case lawyers to ensure proper representation for the accused and allowed jurors who do not personally support the death penalty to serve in the guilt phase of the trial. Romney said; "In the past, efforts to reinstate the death penalty in Massachusetts have failed. They have failed because of concerns that it would be too broadly applied or that evidentiary standards weren't high enough or proper safeguards weren't in place. We have answered all those concerns with this bill." The Massachusetts House of Representatives defeated the bill 99-53.

=== Drunk driving: Melanie's Bill ===
In May 2005, Romney presented a proposal to the Massachusetts General Court to crack down on repeat drunk drivers. Massachusetts had some of the weakest drunk driving laws of any state in the country, and the state was losing $9 million annually from its highway budget because existing laws were not in compliance with federal standards. Romney called his proposal "Melanie's Bill" in honor of Melanie Powell, a 13-year-old who was killed in 2003 by a repeat drunk driver while walking to the beach with friends. The bill included provisions that gave prosecutors greater power to go after repeat offenders with increased penalties. It also increased license suspensions, raised sentencing guidelines and required repeat drunk drivers to install ignition-interlock devices in their vehicles. The state House Judiciary Committee removed many of the bill's provisions and sent the reduced version to an eventual conference committee. Romney criticized the "watered down" bill, which he said reflected the interests of defense lawyers, and sent the bill back to legislators with amendments to restore some of the original provisions. On October 28, 2005, Romney signed the amended version of the bill, which approved two of Romney's three amendments and rejected Romney's provision for increasing penalties for motorists who refuse to take a breathalyzer test. Eleven months after the enactment of Melanie's Law, arrests of repeat drunk drivers decreased by half, and the number of drivers agreeing to breathalyzer tests increased by more than 18 percent.

=== Increase in crime rates ===
In July 2006 Romney offered the assistance of his state police force to municipalities dealing with increased crime rates. Romney's offers were rejected by local officials. Officials from Boston Police unions complained that "if state aid hadn't been cut in recent years, then the city's police force might be staffed adequately to handle the crime surge."

=== Pardons and commutations ===
Romney was the first governor in modern Massachusetts history to deny every request for a pardon or commutation during his four years in office. He denied 100 requests for commutations and 172 requests for pardons, including the request from a soldier serving in Iraq to be pardoned for a conviction at age 13 involving a BB gun.

== Abortion ==
In March 2002 during his run for governor, Romney told the Lowell Sun that, "On a personal basis, I don't favor abortion. However, as governor of the commonwealth, I will protect a woman's right to choose under the laws of the country and the commonwealth. That's the same position I've had for many years." Also, during the 2002 governor's race, Romney's platform stated, "As Governor, Mitt Romney would protect the current pro-choice status quo in Massachusetts. No law would change. The choice to have an abortion is a deeply personal one. Women should be free to choose based on their own beliefs, not the government's." Romney promised to "preserve and protect a woman's right to choose" and declared "I will not change any provisions in Massachusetts' pro-choice laws".

By July 2005, Romney criticized Roe v. Wade in a veto message in rejecting a bill mandating access to emergency contraception. In a February 2006 interview, Romney said that his views had "evolved" and "changed" since 2002 such that he then considered himself to be a "pro-life governor."

Romney says that his views on abortion were drastically altered on November 9, 2004, after discussing stem cell research with Douglas Melton, a stem cell researcher at Harvard University. The Harvard Stem Cell Institute was planning research that would have involved therapeutic cloning. The Governor says that Melton declared that the research "is not a moral issue because we kill the embryos at 14 days." "I looked over at Beth Myers, my chief of staff, and we both had exactly the same reaction, which is it just hit us hard," recalled Romney. "And as they walked out, I said, 'Beth, we have cheapened the sanctity of life by virtue of the Roe v. Wade mentality.' And from that point forward, I said to the people of Massachusetts, 'I will continue to honor what I pledged to you, but I prefer to call myself pro-life.'" Melton disputes Romney's account of the meeting, declaring "Governor Romney has mischaracterized my position; we didn't discuss killing or anything related to it ... I explained my work to him, told him about my deeply held respect for life, and explained that my work focuses on improving the lives of those suffering from debilitating diseases."

In a May 2005 press conference, Romney when asked about Massachusetts abortion laws stated, "I have indicated that as governor, I am absolutely committed to my promise to maintain the status quo with regards to laws relating to abortion and choice, and so far I've been able to successfully do that."

Romney has said he has kept his campaign promises. Romney vetoed an emergency contraception bill in July 2005, claiming that allowing it to pass into law would violate his "moratorium" on changes to the abortion laws. He vetoed a bill on pro-life grounds that the bill would expand access to emergency contraception in hospitals and pharmacies. He returned from his vacation house in New Hampshire to veto the bill, because the Lt. Govorner, Kerry Healey would have signed the bill into law. The legislature voted overwhelmingly to overturn the veto and pass the bill into law on September 15, 2005. At the time of the veto, Romney said he does not support abortion except in cases of rape, incest, and when the life of the mother is threatened. He opposed the U.S. Supreme Court decision in Roe v. Wade, criticizing "'one size fits all' judicial pronouncements". The following year, Romney's spokesperson has also indicated that were he the governor of that state, he would sign into law the controversial South Dakota abortion law, but include exceptions for cases of incest or rape, which the South Dakota law excludes.

In 2005, Romney's top political strategist, Michael Murphy, told National Review that the Governor had "been a pro-life Mormon faking it as a pro-choice friendly." Murphy later explained that he "was discussing a characterization the governor's critics use."

== Stem cell research ==
During his 2002 campaign, Romney had expressed broad support for embryonic stem cell research, and said he would lobby President Bush (who the year before had banned most federal funding for such research) to support it. In particular, Romney stated that he supported the use of surplus embryos from fertility clinics for stem-cell research. In early 2005, Romney announced his position on therapeutic cloning for the first time, saying he was against it, but was still in favor of research on unused embryos from fertility treatments. Per this stance, he vetoed a Massachusetts bill to fund stem-cell research because the legislation allowed such cloning of human embryos. "I am not in favor of creating new human embryos through cloning," said Romney, calling the practice "a matter of profound moral and ethical consequence". Romney also opposed the legislation because of its assertion that life does not begin until an embryo is implanted in a uterus. "It is very conceivable that scientific advances will allow an embryo to be grown for a substantial period of time outside the uterus," Romney said in an interview with The Boston Globe. "To say that it is not life at one month or two months or four months or full term, just because it had never been in a uterus, would be absurd." The state legislature overrode Romney's veto, with many legislators feeling that stem-cell research will be important in the future to the state's biotech industry.

== Military and veterans benefits ==
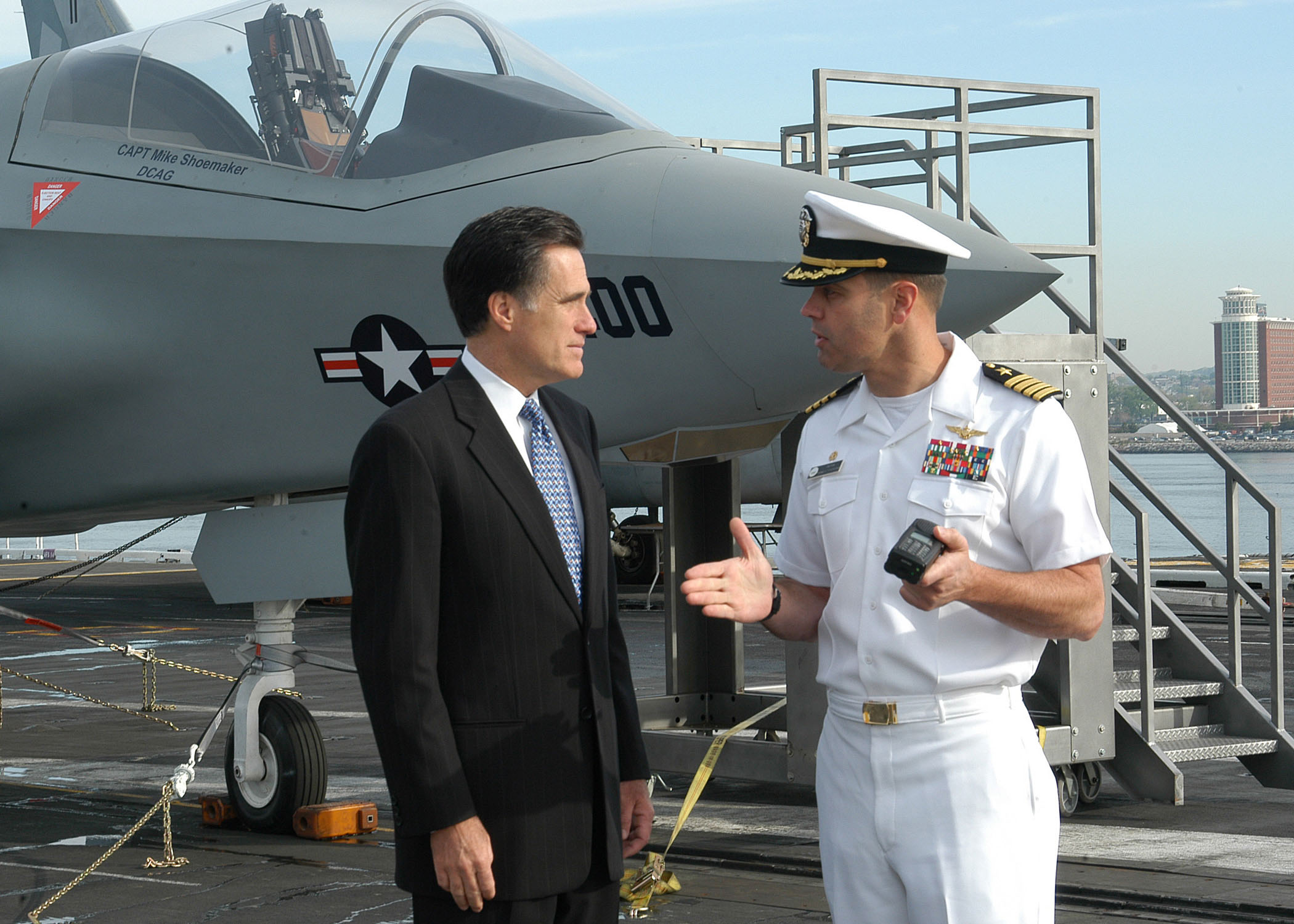
Governor Romney received a tour of the aircraft carrier USS John F. Kennedy in May 2005 as part of celebrating Armed Forces Day.

In February 2005, Romney filed legislation to increase benefits for Massachusetts National Guard members. Working with the state legislature, Romney developed the "Welcome Home Bill" which provides guardsman with reduced life-insurance premiums and free tuition and fees at Massachusetts universities and community colleges. The bill also increases daily state active-duty pay rate from $75 to $100, and increases the death benefit paid to families of Guard members killed in the line of duty from $5,000 to $100,000. Additionally, the "Welcome Home Bill" creates a $1,000 bonus for Guardsman and reservists called to active duty in Iraq and Afghanistan since the September 11, 2001 attacks and a $500 bonus for those who were activated for duty elsewhere. The legislation provides a $2,000 benefit for Gold Star spouses and increases the Gold Star parents' benefit from $1,500 to $2,000. High school diplomas will also be granted to veterans who dropped out to enlist in World War II, Korea or Vietnam wars. Romney signed the bill into law on Veterans Day 2005.

In a November 3, 2006 press release, Romney stated that the account that funds the insurance benefits created in the "Welcome Home Bill" faced a deficit of $64,000. The Massachusetts legislature was out of session at the time of the shortfall. According to the press release, Romney transferred money from the governor's office budget to cover the deficit.

Working with the legislature, Romney developed legislation to provide tax exemptions to disabled veterans and benefits to families of fallen and missing soldiers. Romney signed the Massachusetts Military Enhanced Relief Individual Tax (MERIT) Plan into law on August 14, 2006. The bill increases property tax exemptions for disabled veterans and grants spouses of veterans killed or missing in action since September 11, 2001 full property tax exemptions for five years. After five years the spouses receive an annual $2,500 exemption under the legislation.

Romney was also the first governor in Massachusetts history to appoint a secretary of veteran's affairs to his cabinet.

Romney's efforts to assist Massachusetts servicemen were recognized by the Employer Support for the Guard and Reserve, which presented him with the Pro Patria Award and the 2006 Secretary of Defense Employer Support Freedom Award.

== Housing ==
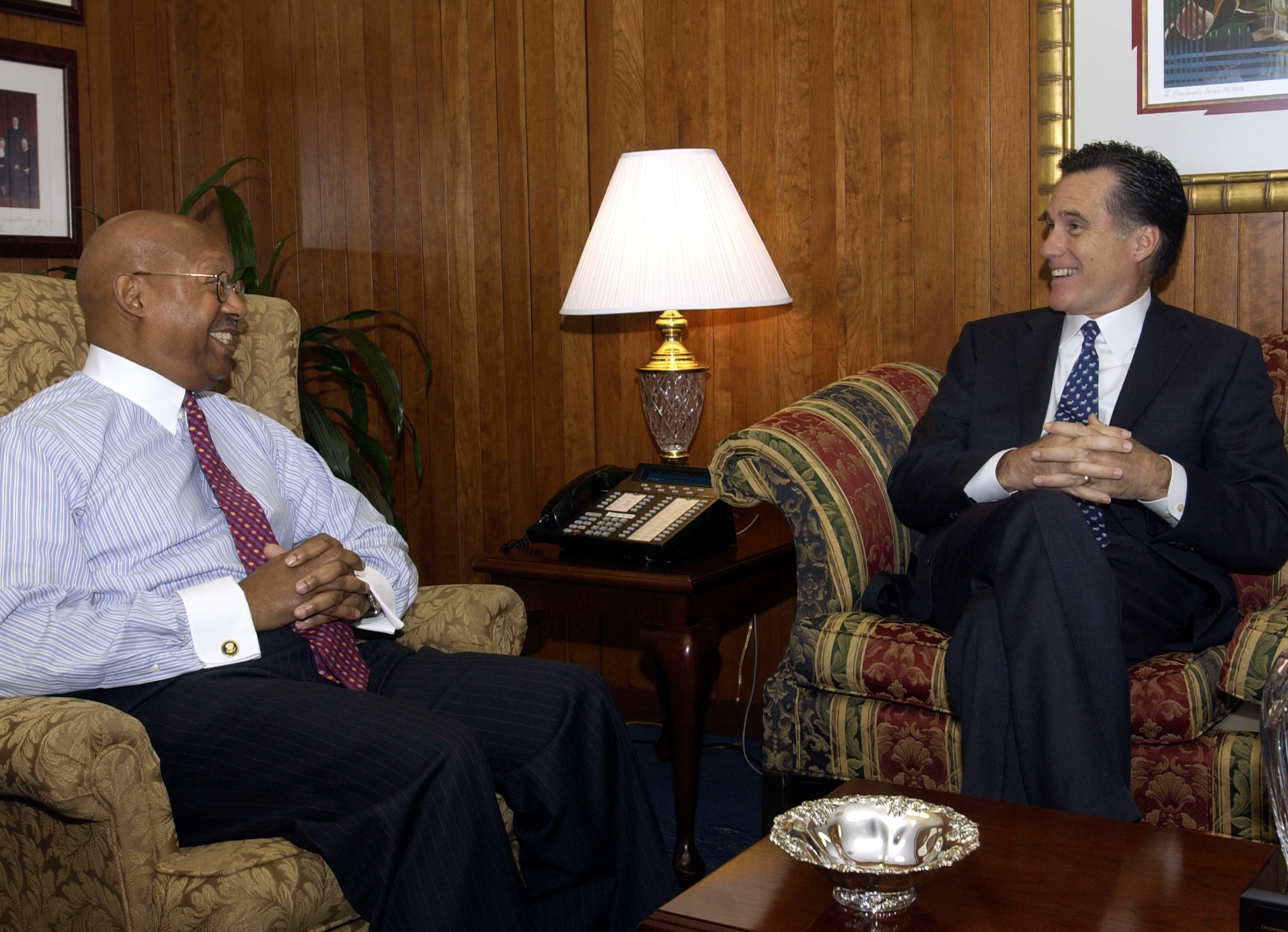
Governor Romney with HUD Secretary Alphonso Jackson in May 2004.

As governor, Romney signed off on a substantial increase in funding for the construction of thousands of new housing units, especially in urban or downtown areas. A goal of this was to counteract the state's otherwise high housing prices.

== Minimum wage ==
As a candidate for governor in 2002, Romney proposed indexing the minimum wage to inflation and raising the hourly pay for the state's lowest-paid workers from $6.75 an hour to $6.96 an hour starting January 2004, saying, "I do not believe that indexing the minimum wage will cost us jobs. I believe it will help us retain jobs."

In July 2006, the legislature passed a bill increasing the minimum wage to $8.00 an hour, and he vetoed it. "I have spent hours reading a wide array of reviews on the minimum wage and its impact on the economy, and there's no question raising the minimum wage excessively causes a loss of jobs, and the loss of jobs is at the entry level," said Romney when he vetoed the bill. He proposed an increase to $7.00/hour (which represented a 25 cents an hour increase over the existing rate.) The legislature voted on July 31, 2006 to override his veto (unanimously in the Senate) thus setting the minimum wage at the higher amount.

== Illegal immigration ==
Romney vetoed a bill in 2004 that would have allowed illegal immigrants to obtain in-state tuition rates at state colleges if they graduated from a Massachusetts high school after attending it for at least three years and signed an affidavit affirming that they intended to seek citizenship. Romney argued that the bill would cost the state government $15 million and that Massachusetts should not reward illegal immigration. A study by the Massachusetts Taxpayers Foundation predicted that the legislation would generate over $5 million in state revenues; the Massachusetts Coalition for Immigration Reform disputed this conclusion. In 2005, the bill was reintroduced to the House and brought to a vote on January 11, 2006. The legislation was defeated 96-57.

On December 2, 2006, it was reported that a landscaping company Romney contracted to perform yard work at his home had been suspected of employing illegal immigrants. Romney said that he was unaware of the immigration status of the company's employees. A year later it was reported that the same company was still using illegal immigrants to work on Romney's estate. After this second report, Romney fired the landscape company.

Later in December 2006, Romney signed an agreement with the U.S. Immigration and Customs Enforcement (ICE) agency that would have allowed Massachusetts State Police troopers to arrest and seek deportation of suspected illegal immigrants they encounter over the course of their normal duties. Under the terms of the agreement, a group of 30 troopers would have received specialized training allowing them to question and detain suspected illegal immigrants, charge them with a violation of immigration law and place them in removal proceedings.

The executive order pertaining to state police was consistent with Section 287(g) of federal immigration law. Section 287(g) is a program of the Illegal Immigration Reform and Immigrant Responsibility Act of 1996 that deputizes state and local law enforcement personnel to enforce immigration matters.

The agreement was never implemented because governor-elect Deval Patrick, who had expressed strong opposition to the agreement before it was signed, revoked it a month later when he was sworn in.

== Environment ==
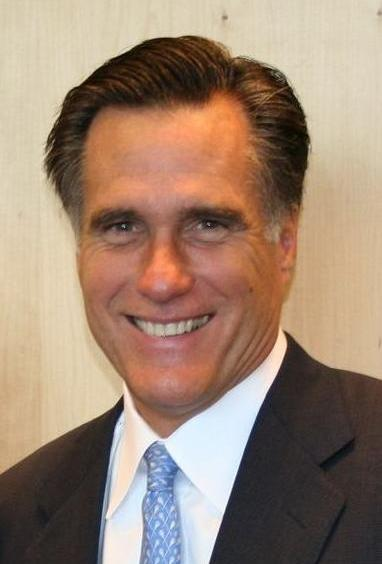
Governor Mitt Romney in June 2006

In May 2004, Romney issued a 72-point Climate Protection Plan describing the approach his administration would take on environmental matters. Later that year, he issued a press release that stated, "Costs are down, but environmental enforcement is up". He supported regulation of greenhouse gas emissions, primarily through voluntary measures. He initially supported the Regional Greenhouse Gas Initiative (RGGI), but ultimately pulled Massachusetts out of the project when he could not ensure that there would be caps on the fees charged to businesses which exceeded emission limits, out of concern that the increased costs businesses would face would be passed to consumers. The decision to not participate in RGGI was revealed on the day that he announced he would not run for re-election, spurring accusations that he had switched his stance in order to gain support from industry groups for a possible presidential campaign.

Although Romney voiced support for wind farm projects in several Massachusetts towns, he opposed the Cape Wind offshore wind farm proposed for Nantucket Sound, saying that it would depress property values and damage the local, tourism-based economy in an area he described as pristine and a "national treasure". Cape Wind supporters accused Romney and federal lawmakers of "back-door deal-making" in an attempt to kill the project, while elected officials opposed to the project accused Cape Wind developers of receiving a "back-room deal" for the 24 square miles (62 km^{2}) of state-controlled property targeted to be used in the project.

In August 2006, Romney unveiled an energy plan calling for improved energy-efficiency requirements for state buildings, increased use of biofuels in the state automobile fleet, the creation of a prize-rewards lottery for consumers who buy energy-efficient equipment, and proposals for wind and biomass power-generation for state facilities. Three months later, in November 2006, Romney cut $7 million from the maintenance budget for the state's parklands (the sixth largest state park system in the country). He also cut hundreds of thousands of dollars from the budget for environmental law enforcement, efforts to promote cleaner water in communities, and hazardous waste cleanup.

== Transportation policy and the "Big Dig" ==
During his campaign for governor, Romney proposed merging the Massachusetts Turnpike Authority, the government agency that managed the massive "Big Dig" project in Boston, with the Massachusetts Highway Department. Under Massachusetts law the Turnpike Authority is an independent agency that does not report to the governor. After being elected Governor, Romney called for the merger in 2003 and 2004. The Massachusetts legislature rejected Romney's call for consolidation. However the legislature did approve making the head of the Massachusetts Department of Transportation the head of the Turnpike Authority.

Following the discovery of leaks in the I-93 tunnel, Romney called for the resignation of Matthew Amorello, the Chairman and CEO of the Turnpike Authority. Amorello refused to resign and in June 2005, Romney asked the Massachusetts Supreme Judicial Court to grant him the authority to fire Amorello. The request was denied, as the court declined to hear his case. In July 2006 a woman was killed when a section of the I-90 roof collapsed on her car. Citing continued mismanagement of the project, Romney once again called for Amorello's dismissal and initiated legal proceedings to oust the chairman. Despite calls from Massachusetts Attorney General Tom Reilly, House Speaker Salvatore DiMasi, Senate President Robert Travaglini, Boston Mayor Thomas Menino, the chairman of both the house and senate transportation committees and the editorial boards of the Boston Globe and Herald, Amorello once again refused to step aside. Romney responded by filing emergency legislation to wrest control of the inspection of the Big Dig tunnel system from the Turnpike Authority. The Massachusetts State Legislature overwhelmingly approved the legislation, which Romney signed on July 14, 2006. The Department of Transportation began immediate inspections of the I-90 tunnel and pledged a "stem to stern" review of the entire Big Dig Tunnel System. Meanwhile, Romney continued his effort to fire Amorello. He scheduled a termination hearing for the Chairman for July 27, 2006. Facing increasing pressure from associates and colleagues, Amorello resigned, effective August 16, 2006, one and a half hours before the hearing was to take place. "A new era of reform and accountability at the Massachusetts Turnpike Authority has begun," said Romney after receiving the resignation. "Patronage will be replaced by professionalism, and secrecy will be replaced by openness." Romney has pledged a "nationwide" search for a replacement to lead the Turnpike Authority and the Big Dig. Romney's administration then hired Bechtel to inspect the faulty work it had itself done.

Since the collapse, the Securities and Exchange Commission has informally investigated whether Massachusetts Turnpike Authority bonds misled investors. The SEC has requested documents relating to the Big Dig from the Turnpike Authority, the state Treasurer's office, the highway department and the governor's executive transportation office.

As governor, Romney worked with members of Congress from Massachusetts to request federal spending earmarks to benefit state transportation projects. These included a safety review for the Big Dig as well as funds for local bridges and highway interchanges.

== Emergency responses ==
In May 2006, heavy rains produced flooding in Massachusetts. Romney declared a state of emergency, mobilized the Massachusetts National Guard, called for volunteers and charitable donations to help residents, and asked President Bush to declare the flooded area a major disaster area. Romney was criticized by local politicians when he vetoed $5.7 million in state funding for flood control in Peabody six months after the town was flooded in April 2004. After Peabody again suffered flooding in May 2006, Romney announced that he supported spending $2 million of state money on flood control for the town.

== State politics ==
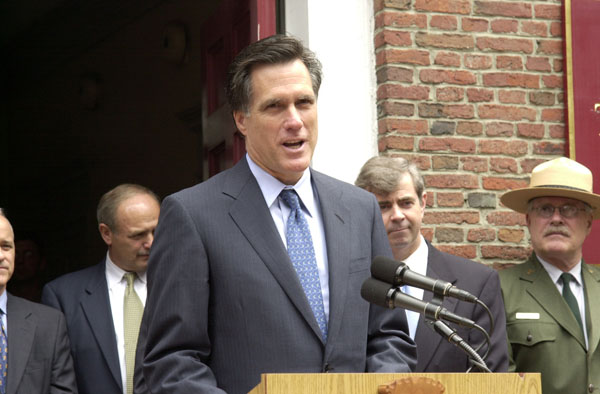
Governor Romney speaking at a ceremony, at the Old North Church in Boston, marking the announcement of a Save America's Treasures Historic Preservation grant for the Church, May 27, 2003.

Romney's relationship with the state legislature was somewhat fraught. He insisted that discussions with executive branch appointees always go through the governor's office, which left legislators annoyed. Furthermore, he withheld giving the legislators permanent authority to create new committees or to grant committee chairs pay increases. Romney was disinclined towards making political deals with the legislature, saying: "I ran on the platform of cleaning up the mess on Beacon Hill, [and] reform means changing the way things are. Legislatures by and large, despite the political titles, are conservative. They don't want to change the way things work. So of course it's going to be a battle."

On a personal level, Romney mostly only dealt with the leadership of the state legislature, and rarely developed any political or social relationships with most of the members. Indeed, he failed to memorize the names and faces of all of them, and sometimes greeted them incorrectly as a result. Legislators complained that he did not extend customary courtesies towards them, such as seat locations at public events, legislative liaison practices, and access to an elevator within the capitol building.

In 2004, the legislature passed a measure over his veto that took away the governor's ability to appoint a body to fill a vacancy in the U.S. Senate and instead set a schedule an early special election. This was in large part an attempt to keep a seat in Democratic hands should Senator John Kerry's campaign in the 2004 United States presidential election, succeed. (This measure was reversed in 2009 following the death of Senator Edward M. Kennedy, permitting the then-Democratic governor to promptly appoint to fill the vacancy, pending the mandated election no more than 160 days after the vacancy occurred.) In any case, Romney did not think much of Kerry, labeling him "a very conflicted person" who would be "a most unfortunate person to have as president of the United States." By comparison, Romney expressed a measure of admiration for his one-time electoral rival, saying "Senator Kennedy is a workhorse."

In the Massachusetts Senate elections, 2004 and Massachusetts House election, 2004, Romney campaigned heavily to try to recruit Republican candidates to contest seats, coming up with 131 such candidates, an unusually large number for the weak Massachusetts Republican party to field. Overseeing a $3 million fund-raising effort for what he called Team Reform, he financed radio and television convincement campaigns on issues such as tuition for children of illegal immigrants. However, his efforts were for naught. Republicans lost two seats in the state House and one seat in the state Senate, and the Democrats who had supported some of Romney's measures but were nonetheless still targeted took personal offense at the entire effort. Romney subsequently made a conscious decision to focus less on the state Republican Party and more on bipartisanship at the state level and his own interests at the national level.

Romney issued 844 vetoes as governor, the large share of which were overturned by one or the other of the state houses. Late in Romney's term, his vetoes issued began to annoy Republicans in the legislature and he lost support among them too. Every veto in his final year in office was overturned by the legislature. Nevertheless, Romney defended the practice: "I know how to veto. I like vetoes. I've vetoed hundreds of spending appropriations as governor."

== Last year of term ==
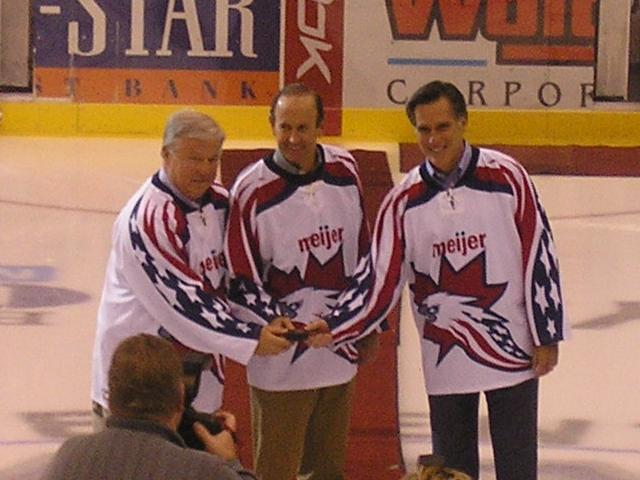
Mississippi Governor Haley Barbour, Michigan gubernatorial candidate Dick DeVos, and Governor Romney drop the puck at a Saginaw Spirit hockey game in November 2006 at the Dow Event Center in Saginaw, Michigan.

On December 14, 2005, Romney announced that he would not seek re-election for a second term as governor, fueling speculation about a run for the White House in 2008 in the face of rising dissatisfaction with the Republican Party in the state.

In 2006, his last year as governor, Romney spent all or part of 212 days out of state, laying the foundation for his anticipated presidential campaign. The cost of the Governor's security detail for out-of-state trips increased from $63,874 in fiscal year 2005 to a cost of $103,365 in the first 11 months of fiscal year 2006. Romney's use of state troopers for security during his campaign trips was criticized by former Governor Michael Dukakis, who never traveled with state troopers during his 1988 presidential run, and Mary Boyle of Common Cause who complained that "[t]he people of Massachusetts are essentially funding his presidential campaign, whether they like it or not." A Romney spokesman noted that Romney did not accept a salary while he was Governor and that he paid for his personal and political travel, while the superintendent of the State Police pointed out that the Governor never requested the security and that the security detail followed the Governor on all trips. In some cases his statements made while campaigning elsewhere in the country came back to affect him in Massachusetts, such as when he caused offense by using the term "tar baby" in Iowa in reference to the potential pitfalls of taking responsibility for the Big Dig.

Lieutenant Governor Kerry Healey became the Republican nominee for the 2006 Massachusetts gubernatorial race and subsequently lost overwhelmingly to Democratic nominee Deval Patrick.

At the end of Romney's term, several of his staffers purchased the hard drives from their state-issued computers, and emails were deleted from the server. The amounts expended purchasing the drives came to nearly $100,000. Under the Massachusetts Public Records Law, the emails did not have to be made public but did have to be preserved. Terry Dolan, who worked as director of administration under Romney and several other governors, has said that scrubbing the servers was a common practice but that selling the hard drives was not. When news of the actions became widely known in 2011, a Romney spokesperson said that the purchase of the computer equipment "complied with the law and longtime executive branch practice." State government officials and aides to Romney's three predecessors as governor said that they did not know of any prior sales of hard drives to staffers. When questioned on the subject in 2011, Romney responded that he had not wanted the information to be available to "opposition research teams".

Romney's term ended January 4, 2007. Romney filed papers to establish a formal exploratory presidential campaign committee on his next-to-last day in office as governor.

== Job approval ratings as governor ==
| Date | Approval | Disapproval | Notes |
|---|---|---|---|
| Feb. 2003 | 56% | 23% | |
| June 2003 | 56% | 36% | |
| Sep. 2003 | 61% | 36% | |
| Nov. 2003 | 66% | 33% | Before Supreme Judicial Court ruling on gay marriage. |
| April 2004 | 58% | 40% | |
| Sep. 2004 | 55% | 44% | |
| March 2005 | 50% | 37% | After rumors of exploring run for presidency. |
| Aug. 2005 | 50% | 40% | |
| March 2006 | 46% | 47% | After announcing not running for re-election. |
| June 2006 | 39% | 56% | |
| Nov. 2006 | 34% | 65% | Lowest approval of governorship. |
| Dec. 2006 | 39% | 59% | Last full month of governorship. |

Romney had job approval ratings around 50 percent for most of his term, but they began to decline towards the end of his term. A March 2005 poll found that only 32 percent felt Romney should be re-elected if he ran for a second term as governor (69 percent of Republicans said he should be re-elected, compared to 31 percent of independents and 12 percent of Democrats). Many in Massachusetts grew dissatisfied with Romney's frequent out-of-state travel and shift toward promoting socially conservative issues as he began to focus increasingly on national rather than state politics.

== Cabinet and administration ==
The Romney Cabinet
| OFFICE | NAME | TERM |
| Governor | Mitt Romney | 2003 – 2007 |
| Lt. Governor | Kerry Healey | 2003 – 2007 |
| Commonwealth Development | Douglas I. Foy; Andrew Gottlieb | 2003 – 2006; 2006 – 2007 |
| Transportation* | Daniel A. Grabauskas; John Cogliano | 2003 – 2005; 2005 – 2007 |
| Housing & Community Development* | Jane Wallis Gumble | 1996 – 2007 |
| Environmental Affairs* | Ellen Roy Herzfelder; Stephen Pritchard; Robert W. Golledge, Jr. | 2003 – 2005; 2005 – 2006; 2006 – 2007 |
| Economic Development | Robert Pozen; Ranch C. Kimball | 2003 – 2004; 2004 – 2007 |
| Consumer Affairs & Business Regulation** | Beth Lindstrom; Janice S. Tatarka | 2003 – 2006; 2006 – 2007 |
| Business & Technology** | Barbara Berke; Renee Fry; Deborah Shufrin | 2003 – 2005; 2005 – 2006; 2006 – 2007 |
| Workforce Development** | Jane C. Edmonds | 2003 – 2007 |
| Health and Human Services | Ron Preston; Timothy R. Murphy | 2003 – 2004; 2005 – 2007 |
| Elder Affairs | Jennifer Davis Carey | 2003 – 2007 |
| Labor | Angelo R. Buonopane; Gayl Mileszko | 2003 – 2005; 2006 – 2007 |
| Administration & Finance | Eric Kriss; Thomas Trimarco | 2003 – 2005; 2005 – 2007 |
| Veterans' Services | Thomas G. Kelley | 2003 – 2007 |
| Public Safety & Homeland Security | Edward A. Flynn; Robert C. Haas | 2003 – 2006; 2006 – 2007 |

* reports to Commonwealth Development
** reports to Economic Development
Source: www.mass.gov

== See also ==
- Massachusetts state legislature in 2003–2004 and 2005–2006

Political offices
| Preceded by Argeo Paul Cellucci | Massachusetts Republican Party gubernatorial candidate 2002 (won) | Succeeded by Kerry Healey |
| Preceded by Jane Swift (as Acting Governor) | Governor of Massachusetts; January 2, 2003 – January 4, 2007 | Succeeded by Deval Patrick |
