= LHH =

LHH or lhh may refer to:

- Lawyers Have Heart, an annual Washington D.C. fundraising event for the American Heart Association
- Lenox Hill Hospital, Manhattan, New York City
- LHH, a talent acquisition and job recruitment subsidiary of Adecco Group North America
- lhh, ISO 639-3 code for the Laha language, Ambon Island, Indonesia
