= Allion =

Allion may refer to:

- Toyota Allion, model of sedan manufactured by Toyota
- Allion Healthcare, former healthcare drug company based in New York
