= Ellen Roy Herzfelder =

Former Massachusetts politician

Secretary of the Massachusetts Executive Office of Environmental Affairs
- In office 2002–2005
- Succeeded by: Stephen R. Pritchard

Personal details
- Born: Newton, Massachusetts, U.S.
- Political party: Republican, Gov. Mitt Romney
- Education: Harvard and MIT
- Occupation: Politician, businesswoman, lecturer

Ellen Roy Herzfelder (née Roy) is an American politician, entrepreneur and university lecturer who served as Secretary of the Massachusetts Executive Office of Energy and Environmental Affairs from 2002 to 2005.

== Childhood and education ==
She was born in Newton, Massachusetts and lives in Cohasset. Herzfelder has a Bachelor of Arts from Harvard, a Masters of Public Policy from the Harvard Kennedy School, and a Masters of Business Administration from the MIT Sloan School of Management.

== Career ==
Herzfelder co-founded the family-owned International Energy Company, an electricity company. Parts of the corporation was sold 1988 to Florida Power and Light.

In Spring 2002, Herzfelder was hired as senior lecturer at the Massachusetts Institute of Technology's Sloan School of Management.

In 2002, Herzfelder was appointed as the Secretary of the Massachusetts Executive Office of Environmental Affairs for Governor Mitt Romney. She had little to no previous experience in a environmental position, raising concerns from some.

Herzfelder resigned in 2005. Her resignation came after a family company, Intercontinental Energy Corporation, was listed as owing $1 Million in taxes. She later stayed as a special adviser to the governor about ocean management.

She is currently a director at the Pioneer Institute, a non-profit think-tank.

== Politics ==
=== Department of Conservation and Recreation ===
In 2004, Herzfelder merged the Metropolitan District Commission (MDC) and the Department of Environmental Management (DEM) to form the Department of Conservation and Recreation (DCR), the DCR manages all of the state's park areas. The 254 MDC and 354 DEM properties were merged to save money. The merger was thought to save roughly $5 Million, at the cost of laying off 100 of the 2,000 workers. Approximately 460,000 acres of state conservation and watershed regions are under the DCR's management.

Herzfelder assured that MDC properties, such as ice rinks, would remain open and funded.

=== Wind farm ===
Herzfelder approved the initial plans for an offshore wind power plant in Nantucket Sound. The plan would involve building 130 turbines. She required Cape Wind Associates, the developer, to move eight of the ten turbines 12 square miles effectively placing all turbines out of state waters. The plan originally had all of the turbines in federal waters, but the Massachusetts ocean boundary was redrawn by the U.S. Minerals Management Service. The U.S. Army Corps of Engineers were responsible for the review of the project, the draft environmental impact statement was insufficient according to the Environmental Protection Agency, Department of the Interior, and others. Cape Wind Associates redrew the proposal after request from state officials, commercial fisherman, and the U.S. Coast Guard.

The proposal had significant opposition, including Gov. Mitt Romney and Attorney General Thomas F. Reilly, and support, such as Secretary of Commonwealth Development Douglas Foy and Susan Tierney Chairwoman of the Massachusetts Ocean Management Task Force.

The project was later cancelled and Cape Wind relinquished the lease in 2018.

=== Oil spill ===
In April 2003, 98,000 gallons of industrial fuel oil was spilled in Buzzards Bay in the Bouchard Oil Spill. In response Herzfelder and the state passed the Oil Spill Act. The act was intended to reduce the likelihood of future oil spills from vessels. The main requirement was for vessel to use local tug escorts. Herzfelder supported a two-cent per barrel fee on oil shipping to make a $10 Million prevention and response fund for oil spills. Herzfelder's actions were supported by many.

=== Ocean management ===
She was in-part responsible for the state's ocean management plan, a first in the United States. The plan aimed to manage and "zone" the ocean, to avoid exploitation.
