= Bob Crouch =

- Born: Bob Crouch
- Occupation: CEO of Adecco Group North America

Bob Crouch is chief executive officer at Adecco Group North America, a professional recruiting, staffing, consulting and business services provider headquartered in Jacksonville, Florida.

In 2010, the company purchased staffing company Modis.
