= Adecco Staffing, USA =

American recruitment agency

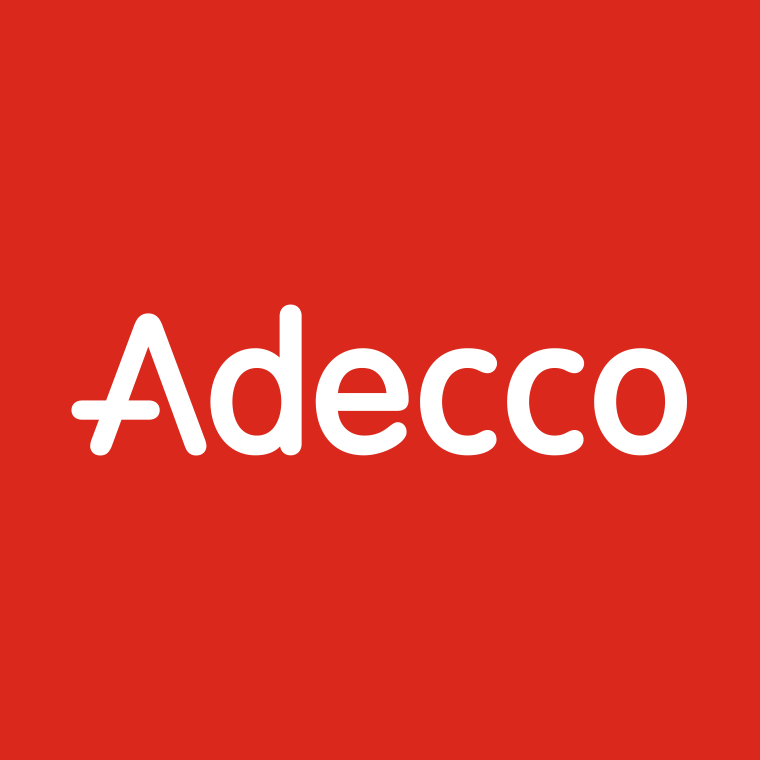
- Type: Corporation
- Traded as: SIX: ADEN
- Industry: Professional services
- Founded: 1996
- Headquarters: Jacksonville, Florida
- Area served: United States
- Key people: Geno Cutolo (Head of Adecco North America)
- Services: Employment agencies, recruitments, human resource consulting and outsourcing
- Website: www.adeccousa.com

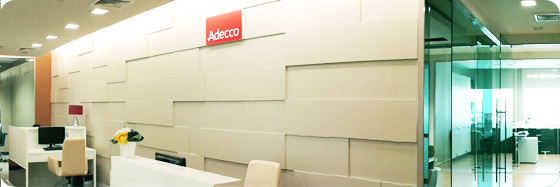
An Adecco Staffing office in Thailand

Adecco Staffing, USA is the second-largest provider of recruitment and staffing services in the United States, offering human resource services such as temporary staffing, permanent placement, outsourcing, career transition or outplacement. Based in Jacksonville, Florida, it serves small, mid-sized, and large companies.

Adecco Staffing is a subsidiary of Adecco Group North America, which is owned by the Swiss-based Adecco Group. In 2016, Adecco Group was 442 in the Fortune Global 500.

== History ==
- 1996: Staffing service firms Adia and ECCO merge to become Adecco.
- 2000, Adecco Group acquires Melville, New York–based Olsten's general staffing and information technology business for $1.5 billion.
- 2009, Adecco made a bid worth $1.17 billion to buy Florida-based MPS Group
- 2014, Adecco Staffing and Adecco Group NA move their headquarters to Jacksonville, Florida, following the October 20, 2009, Adecco Group acquisition of Jacksonville, Florida–based MPS Group, Inc.

== Services ==
Adecco Staffing, USA specializes in temporary staffing, permanent job placement, outsourcing, temp-to-hire, recruiting, career transition (outplacement) services, vendor management services, and payroll services.
