= Bouchard Oil Spill =

2003 oil spill in Westport, USA

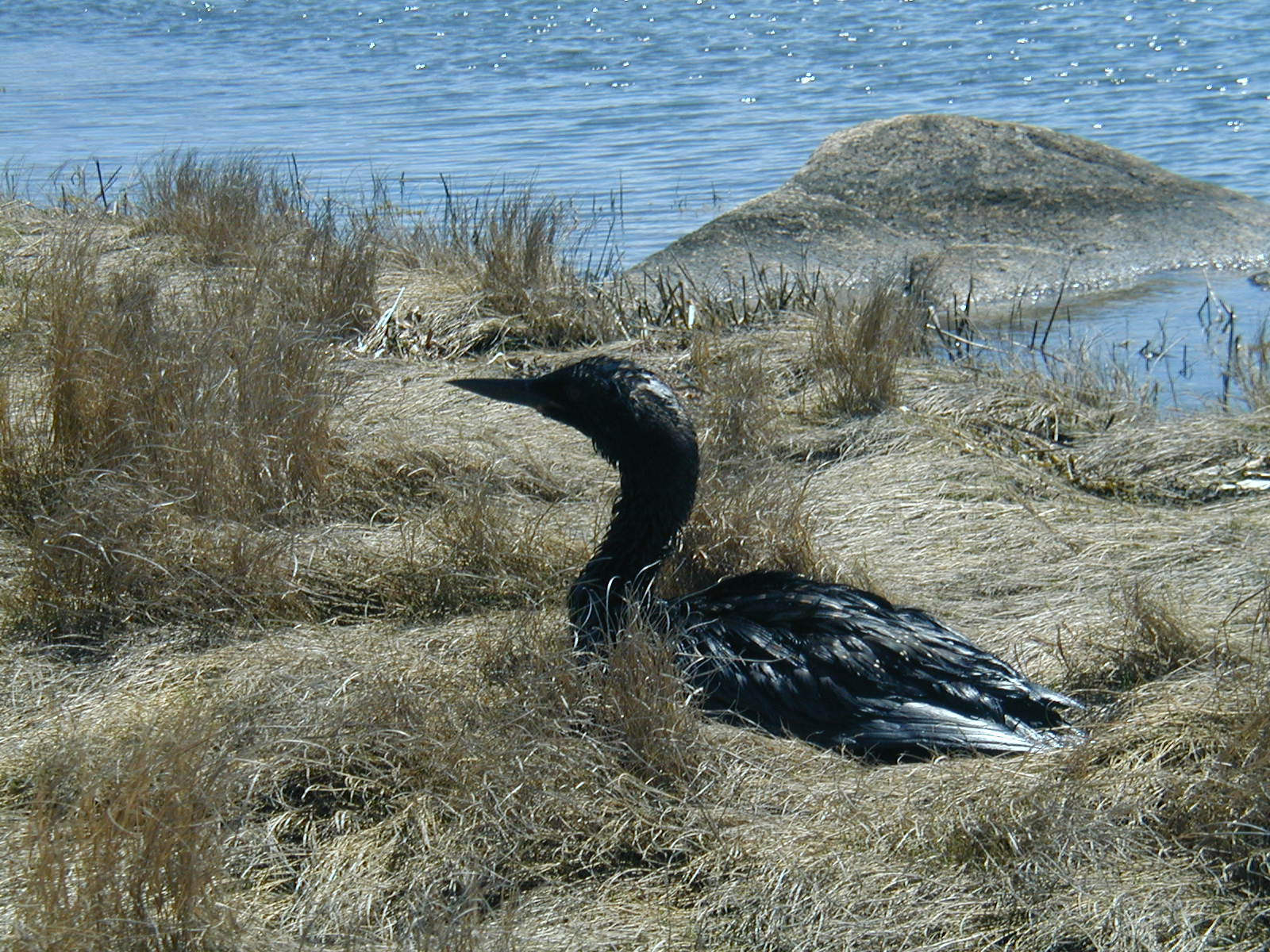
- Oiled Bird Along Nascatucket River
- Interactive map of Bouchard Oil Spill
- Location: Buzzards Bay, Massachusetts
- Coordinates: 41.4311°N 71.0386°W
- Date: 27 April 2003

Cause
- Cause: Grounding
- Casualties: 0 from grounding
- Operator: Bouchard Transportation

Spill characteristics
- Volume: 22,000 gallons (80 m^{3}) - 98,000 gallons (370 m^{3})
- Shoreline impacted: 105 miles (169 km)

The Bouchard Oil Spill was a 2003 oil spill near Westport, Massachusetts. On Sunday April 27, 2003, the Tank Barge Bouchard No. 120 struck rocks south of Westport, Massachusetts. This resulted in a puncture of the barge's hull about twelve feet in length. As a result, the cargo of the barge, number 6 fuel oil, spilled into the waters of Buzzards Bay. While the spill was much smaller than many oil spills, the environmental impacts were felt for years. Estimates of the total amount spilled range from 22,000 to 98,000 gallons of oil according to a publication by the National Oceanic and Atmospheric Administration.

This spill was quite different from some of the more widely known spills like Deepwater Horizon, not just because of its smaller scale, but due to the type of spill that it was. Deepwater, being a spill of oil directly from the ground was pure oil. Bouchard No. 120 contained number 6 fuel oil. A local scientist from Woods Hole Oceanographic Institution explains that the processing of oil yields various components of varying danger to the environment.

NOAA is heavily involved in environmental cleanups of oil spills as well as other damage to wildlife and coastal environments in the United States largely through their Damage Assessment Remediation and Recovery Program (DARRP). Efforts lasted in earnest for several years and continued to some degree until 2007, according to a report by the Buzzards Bay National Estuary Program.

== Background ==
Bouchard No. 120, the barge involved in the incident, was a tank barge operated by Bouchard Transportation. The company was contracted to supply oil to a local power plant, Mirant Power Generating Facility in Sandwich, Massachusetts, with Bouchard No. 120 delivering oil on the day of the incident.

== Grounding and spill ==
On the afternoon of April 27, 2003, Bouchard No. 120, towed by the tugboat Evening Tide, grounded on a shoal near the entrance of the western approach of Buzzards Bay. This occurred as the barge sailed on the wrong side of a navigational marker. The resulting strike created a 12-foot by 2-foot gash on the starboard side of the barge's hull, puncturing its No. 6 fuel cargo hold, releasing oil into the bay.

Soon after the running aground, at 5:30 pm local time Bouchard notified the U.S. Coast Guard (USGC) of the incident. State and federal officials redirected the tug and barge further into the bay, where divers assessed the damage inflicted onto the hull. Another Bouchard barge, Bouchard No. 10, was dispatched to remove any remaining cargo and oil from Bouchard No. 120, with the two barges proceeding to the Mirant facility soon after cargo transfer was completed on April 28.

== Clean-up and aftermath ==
On the morning of April 28, efforts were made to contain the spill. About 1,500 feet of 16-inch containment boom was initially placed around the barge's stern to prevent further oil release into the harbor. And the first week, 8,500 feet of containment boom and 100,000 feet of snare were deployed across the bay. Other techniques such as skimmers, sorbents, and power washing were implemented to recover oil and clean affected shorelines, with Clean Harbors Environmental Services, Inc. and Marine Spill Response Corporation leading the clean-up. On-water oil removal was mainly accomplished through the use of boons and sorbent material, while shoreline clean-up primarily used manual techniques with clean-up crews using shovels and other hand tools. By the eighth day of the response, on-water skimming operations collected approximately 3,500 gallons of oil.

Estimates vary, but approximately 22,000 to 98,000 gallons of oil was released into Buzzards Bay, effecting 105 miles of shoreline. Oil mainly washed ashore on the Massachusetts side of the bay (87 miles of shoreline in Massachusetts and 18 in Rhode Island), where the heaviest damage was also observed. Overall, approximately two-thirds of the oiled shoreline received very light or light oiling, while the other third was moderately to heavily oiled.

Assessments of the spill's impact on aquatic resources and habitats concluded that there was no significant injury to aquatic biota. Modeling and field data analysis showed that water column concentrations of hydrocarbons were not high enough to cause acute toxicity, with further surveys finding no evidence of a significant amount submerged oil. Exposure of American lobster to oil was also evaluated, finding that larvae were unlikely to be significantly exposed, but adult and adolescent lobsters may have been exposed primarily through physical contact with submerged tarballs. However, the overall impact on lobster populations was deemed small.

== See also ==
- List of oil spills
- Exxon Valdez oil spill
- Argo Merchant oil spill
