= Melville, New York =

- Hamlet and census-designated place
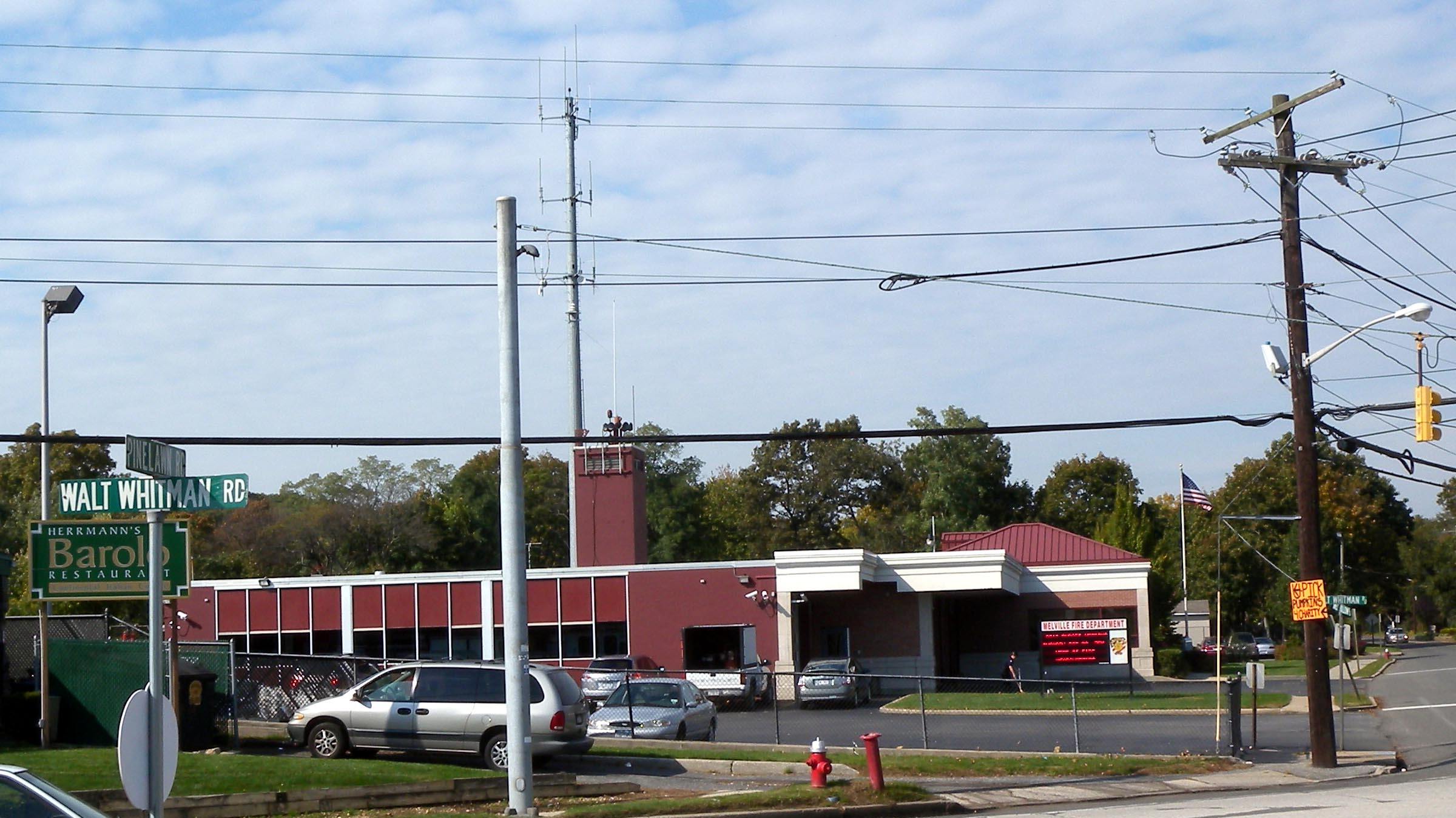
- Melville Fire Department firehouse in 2009

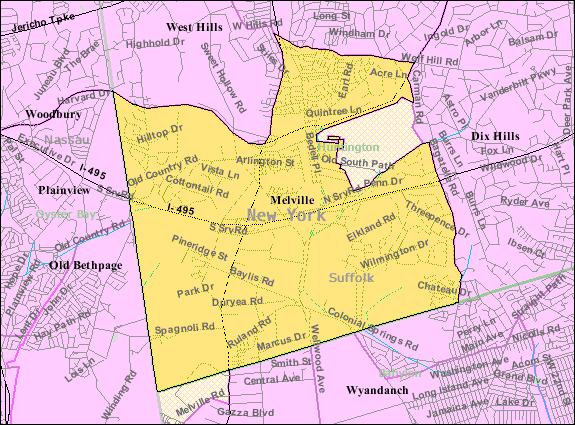
- U.S. Census map of Melville

- Location on Long Island Location within the state of New York
- Coordinates: 40°47′30″N 73°24′20″W
- Country: United States
- State: New York
- County: Suffolk
- Town: Huntington, New York
- Named for: Herman Melville

Area
  - Total: 12.11 sq mi (31.37 km^{2})
  - Land: 12.11 sq mi (31.37 km^{2})
  - Water: 0 sq mi (0.00 km^{2})
- Elevation: 135 ft (41 m)

Population (2020)
  - Total: 19,284
  - Density: 1,592.3/sq mi (614.78/km^{2})
- Time zone: UTC-5 (Eastern (EST))
  - Summer (DST): UTC-4 (EDT)
- ZIP Codes: 11747, 11760, 11775
- Area codes: 631, 934
- FIPS code: 36-46514
- GNIS feature ID: 0956931

Melville is an affluent hamlet and census-designated place (CDP) in the town of Huntington in Suffolk County, on Long Island, in New York, United States. The population was 19,284 at the time of the 2020 census.

== History ==
The area was known to the Native Americans as Sunsquams. In the 17th century, it was named Samuel Ketcham's Valley, after one of the earliest natives living there. It was later known as Sweet Hollow, likely due to the large population of honey bees and the honey found in the trees.

In 1829, a Presbyterian church was built at the corner of Old Country and Sweet Hollow Roads.

In 1909, a trolley line to Huntington was established as an extension of the Huntington Trolley Spur that went south to Amityville and had a connection to Babylon. There were six fare zones, one of which was the Duryea Farm in Melville. A decade later, the line was closed after farmers complained that noise from the trolley frightened their animals. Buses then provided local transportation after the trolley line closed. The growing use of private cars later further reduced demand for the trolley line.

The Presbyterian church was in continuous use until 1930. It reopened in 1944 for the funeral of Edward Baylis and has been in use since then. The church was moved 1 mile (1.6 km) to the west in 1977.

In the 1950s, Melville and three of its neighbors, Dix Hills, Wyandanch, and the area known as Sweet Hollow, proposed incorporating as a single village. The village would have been known as the Incorporated Village of Half Hollow Hills, would have had an area of roughly 50 square miles (130 km^{2}), and would have embraced the Half Hollow Hills Central School District. The plans were unsuccessful.

Office development along Route 110 in Melville increased throughout the 1960s. However, by 1971, the economy had slowed and many of the buildings were left vacant and struggled to find tenants.

In 2001, Melville, Dix Hills, Wheatley Heights, and East Farmingdale, which are all within the same school district, proposed incorporating as a single village. These plans also failed, and each remain unincorporated hamlets to this day.

In 2026, NYU-Langone Health announced that it would construct a new hospital in Melville, on a 45-acre (18 ha) property it had purchased for $135 million; the site had been occupied by One and Two Huntington Quadrangle.

=== Etymology ===
The name Melville was first used in school records in 1854. The exact origin of the name is unknown. Some say it was in honor of American novelist Herman Melville, author of Moby-Dick, which was published three years earlier, in 1851. Melville's 1846 novel Typee also was very popular at that time. However, it is more likely derived from the word mel, which is Latin for honey.

== Geography ==
According to the U.S. Census Bureau, Melville has a total area of 12.1 square miles (31.3 km^{2}).

Melville lies on the east side of Suffolk County's boundary with Nassau County.

=== Climate ===
Melville has a humid subtropical climate (Cfa), bordering on a hot-summer humid continental climate (Dfa). Accordingly, the CDP experiences hot, humid summers and cold winters, and experiences precipitation throughout the entirety of the year.

== Demographics ==
Historical population
Census	Pop.	Note	%±
2000	14,533		—
2010	18,985		30.6%
2020	19,284		1.6%
U.S. Decennial Census

=== 2020 census ===
As of the 2020 census, Melville had a population of 19,284 with 7,368 households. The population density was 1,599.60 inhabitants per square mile (617.61/km^{2}). There were 7,777 housing units, of which 5.3% were vacant; the homeowner vacancy rate was 0.5% and the rental vacancy rate was 4.8%.

The median age was 50.9 years. 18.0% of residents were under the age of 18 and 28.7% of residents were 65 years of age or older. For every 100 females there were 88.0 males, and for every 100 females age 18 and over there were 83.4 males age 18 and over.

Of the 7,368 households, 26.6% had children under the age of 18 living in them. Of all households, 58.1% were married-couple households, 10.4% were households with a male householder and no spouse or partner present, and 27.7% were households with a female householder and no spouse or partner present. About 25.5% of all households were made up of individuals and 18.3% had someone living alone who was 65 years of age or older.

100.0% of residents lived in urban areas, while 0.0% lived in rural areas.

Racial composition as of the 2020 census
Race	Number	Percent
White	14,925	77.4%
Black or African American	859	4.5%
American Indian and Alaska Native	22	0.1%
Asian	2,006	10.4%
Native Hawaiian and Other Pacific Islander	3	0.0%
Some other race	453	2.3%
Two or more races	1,016	5.3%
Hispanic or Latino (of any race)	1,288	6.7%

=== 2010 census ===
The population was 18,985 at the 2010 census.

=== 2000 census ===
As of the 2000 census, there were 14,533 people, 4,930 households, and 3,993 families residing in Melville. The population density was 1,284.00 inhabitants per square mile (495.76/km^{2}).

In 2000, there were 4,930 households, out of which 38.1% had children under the age of 18 living with them, 72.2% were married couples living together, 6.6% had a female householder with no husband present, and 19.0% were non-families. 15.7% of all households were made up of individuals, and 6.8% had someone living alone who was 65 years of age or older. The average household size was 2.88 and the average family size was 3.23.

In the CDP, the population was spread out, with 25.5% under the age of 18, 5.3% from 18 to 24, 29.1% from 25 to 44, 26.0% from 45 to 64, and 14.1% who were 65 years of age or older. The median age was 39 years. For every 100 females, there were 94.6 males. For every 100 females age 18 and over, there were 91.9 males.

In 2000, the median income for a household in the CDP was $132,527, and the median income for a family was $170,881. Males had a median income of $142,972 versus $115,495 for females. The per capita income for the CDP was $125,053. About 3.0% of families and 4.0% of the population were below the poverty line, including 5.2% of those under age 18 and 3.2% of those age 65 or over. The median house price in Melville as of 2007 is about $900,000.

== Economy ==
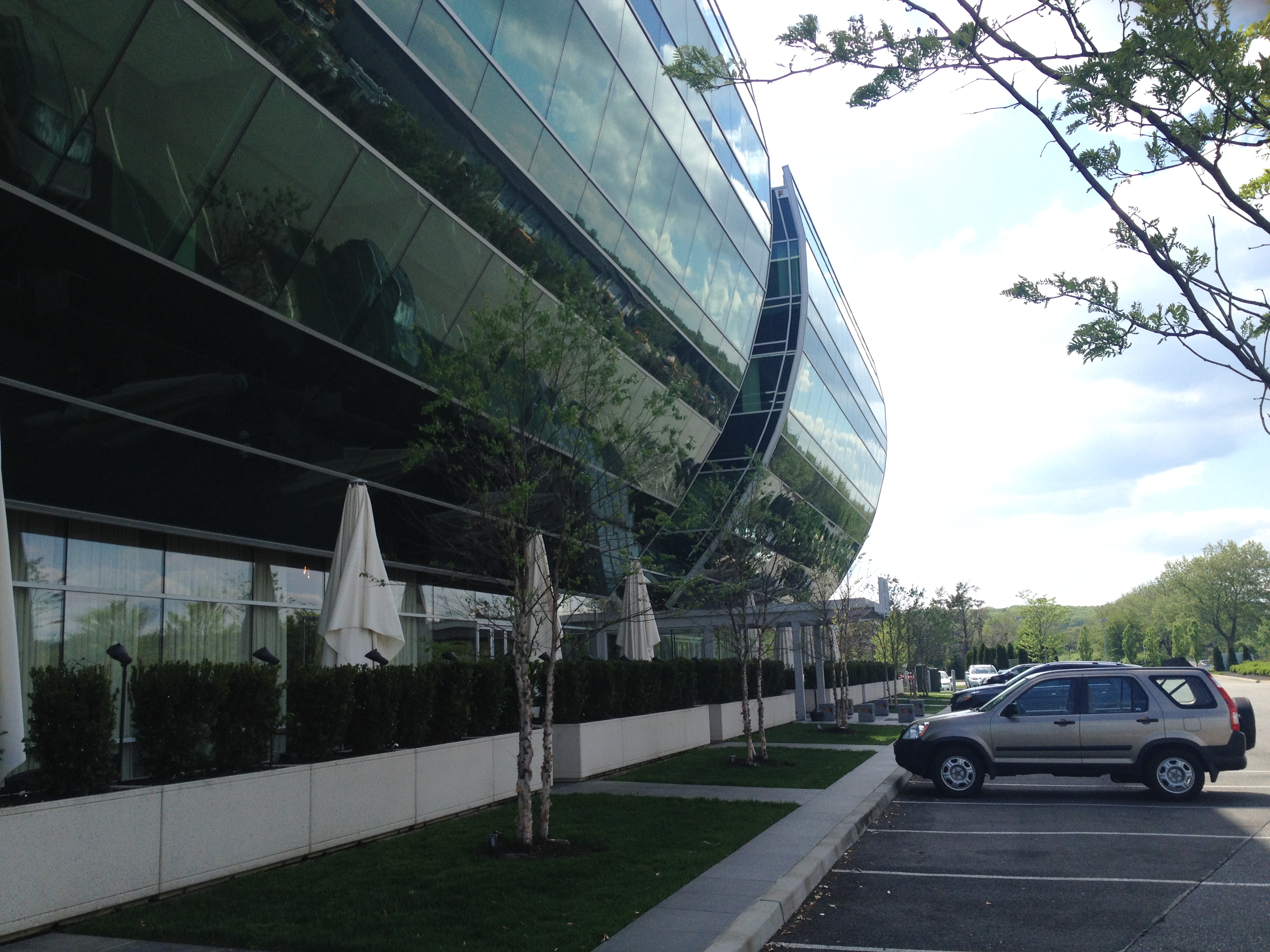
An office building in Melville in 2014

Melville and Hauppauge are the two primary business centers of Suffolk County, which is home to almost approximately 1.5 million people. Melville is home to the U.S. headquarters for several national and international corporations, including Canon USA, Chyron Corporation, Leviton, MSC Industrial Direct, Nikon USA, Henry Schein, and Verint Systems. Significant operations of Manhattan-based The Estée Lauder Companies are also based in Melville. Newsday, Long Island's primary newspaper, is headquartered in Melville.

In early 2013, Canon Inc. moved into its new regional headquarters for North and South America to Melville, building a $500-million 668,296-square-foot (62,086.7 m^{2}) glass structure near Exit 49 of the Long Island Expressway on the 52-acre (210,000 m^{2}) site of a former pumpkin farm. About 1,500 workers were expected to move from Canon's Lake Success offices. The company chose Melville over other tri-state area locations because the employees "didn't want to leave the area".

A number of companies were also once headquartered in Melville. In 1995, Swissair completed its headquarters in Melville. The building was designed by famed architect Richard Meier. However, when the company went out of business and reorganized as Swiss International Airlines in 2002, the new entity moved to Uniondale. Olympus America Inc., the U.S. subsidiary of Olympus Corporation, moved in 2006 to Center Valley, Pennsylvania. Gentiva Health Services, a Fortune 1000 provider of health services, relocated to Atlanta in 2009. Later that year, Allion Healthcare was acquired by H.I.G. Capital.

OSI Pharmaceuticals was bought by Astellas Pharma of Japan in 2010. Arrow Electronics relocated to Centennial, Colorado in 2011. Hain Celestial moved to Lake Success in 2012. The independent television station WLNY-TV operated a studio in Melville. When it was acquired by CBS in 2012, it moved to the network's Manhattan facility. Adecco Staffing, USA moved its U.S. headquarters to Jacksonville, Florida in 2014. When Sbarro re-emerged from bankruptcy in 2014, the chain relocated its headquarters to Columbus, Ohio. First Data announced in 2015 that it would be moving its operations to Georgia. The company left Melville in 2017. Shipping company Bouchard Transportation declared bankruptcy in 2020 and its assets were divided the following year.

== Government ==
As an unincorporated community within the Town of Huntington, Melville is governed directly by said town, which is seated in the hamlet of Huntington.

=== Representation in higher government ===
On the county level, Melville is split between Suffolk County's 15th and 17th Legislative districts, which as of June 2026 are represented in the Suffolk County Legislature by Jason Richberg (D–West Babylon) and Tom Donnelly (D–Deer Park), respectively.

On the state level, Melville is located within the New York State Assembly's 10th State Assembly district and the New York State Senate's 2nd State Senate district, which as of June 2026 are represented by Steve Stern (D–Dix Hills) and Mario R. Mattera (R–St. James), respectively.

On the federal level, Melville is located in New York's 1st congressional district, which as of June 2026 is represented by Nicholas LaLota (R–Amityville). Like the rest of New York, it is represented in the United States Senate by Charles E. Schumer (D) and Kirsten Gillibrand (D); one of Schumer's nine state offices is located in Melville.

=== Politics ===
In the 2024 U.S. presidential election, the majority of Melville voters voted for Kamala D. Harris (D).

== Education ==
Melville is located within the boundaries of the Half Hollow Hills Central School District and the South Huntington Union Free School District. Accordingly, children residing within Melville and attend public schools go to school in one of these two districts, depending on where they live within the hamlet.

== Infrastructure ==
=== Transportation ===
==== Road ====
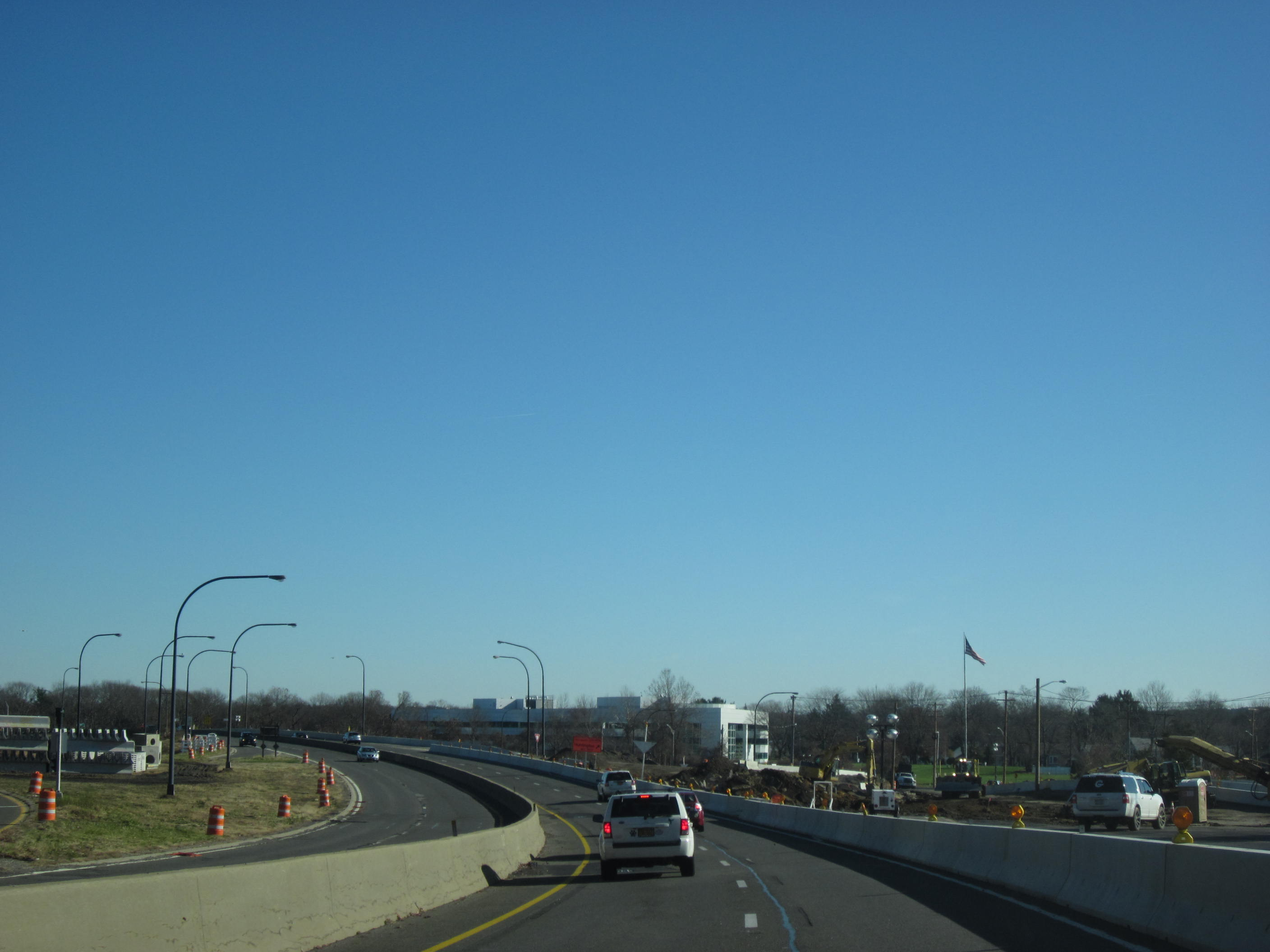
The Northern State Parkway within Melville in 2011

The Long Island Expressway and Northern State Parkway – two of Long Island's busiest highways and major points of entry in and out of New York City – pass through Melville. New York State Route 110 also runs through Melville.

==== Rail ====
Until 1927, Melville was served by the Huntington Railroad's streetcar line, which ran along what today is New York State Route 110 and has now been replaced by the S1 bus. The closest rail line is the LIRR's Main Line to Ronkonkoma and Greenport, but the closest station on that line is Pinelawn, which only provides weekend service. Huntington station in the hamlet of Huntington Station is the closest full service station.

==== Bus ====
Melville's primary mode of public transit is the 1 bus run by Suffolk County Transit. Bus route 1 runs up and down NY 110 seven days a week and connects to two Long Island Rail Road branches north and south of Melville. During weekdays, the "Suffolk Clipper" express bus also serves the numerous business parks in South Melville, along with a park and ride and carpool parking lot north of the Long Island Expressway.

=== Emergency services ===
==== Fire ====
Melville is protected by the Melville Fire District. Established in 1947, the volunteer fire department handles all emergencies – including fires, heavy rescues and extrications, emergency ambulances, hazmat, and other related tasks. The fire department responds to more than 3,500 alarms annually and provides continuous service on an annual budget of $1.5 million.

==== Police ====
Police protection within Melville is provided by the Suffolk County Police Department's Second Precinct.

== See also ==
- List of Census-designated places in New York
- Half Hollow Hills, New York
