= Bouchard Transportation =

- Company type: Private
- Industry: Transportation
- Founded: New York City, United States
- Headquarters: Melville, New York

Bouchard Transportation Co., Inc, based in Melville, New York, was a closely held, family-owned company that provided oil and petroleum product transportation in the United States.

== History ==
The company was founded in 1918 by Capt. Fred Bouchard. The company operated 26 tugboats and 25 oil tanker barges.

In 2014, they were awarded the Tug & Barge Safety Award by American Maritime Safety Inc.

In October 2017, one of its barges, the Buster Bouchard/B No. 255, exploded off Port Aransas, Texas, killing two members of the crew. The firm made efforts to suppress a Coast Guard investigation of the accident and retaliated against employees who cooperated. The investigation indicated the accident was caused by ineffective management by the company.

The company filed for Chapter 11 Bankruptcy in 2020 due to unpaid bills and ongoing lawsuits.

In 2021, the court approved the sale of two groups of vessels, one to JMB for $115.3 million and another to Rose Cay for $130 million. Centerline Logistics also acquired a group of Articulated Tug and Barge vessels from Bouchard Transportation that year.

The company was headed by Morton ‘Morty’ Bouchard from 1992 to March 2021. He was the fourth member of the family to lead the firm. He was removed from his position at the order of a bankruptcy court in March 2021.
