= Allion Healthcare =

American pharmacy company

Allion Healthcare, Inc.
- Type: Public
- Traded as: Nasdaq: ALLI
- Industry: Specialized health services
- Predecessor: The Care Group
- Founded: 1983 (The Care Group); 1999 (Allion)
- Defunct: January 2010
- Fate: Acquired by H.I.G. Capital and taken private
- Headquarters: Melville, New York, United States
- Area served: New York, California, Florida, New Jersey, and Washington
- Key people: Michael Moran (chairman and CEO)
- Revenue: US$341 million (2009)
- Operating income: US$15.7 million (2009)
- Net income: US$7.52 million (2009)
- Total assets: US$271 million (2009)
- Total equity: US$169 million (2009)
- Number of employees: 190 (2009)

Allion Healthcare Inc. was an American specialty pharmacy company based in Melville, New York. It was the parent company of MOMS pharmacy, primarily known for providing mail-order HIV medications to patients primarily on Medicaid or the AIDS Drug Assistance Program (ADAP).

Among the offerings is the MOMSPak in which the drugs are packed together in dated individual packages to make the multi-drug regimen easier.

The company has distribution centers in New York, California, Florida, New Jersey, and Washington.

== History ==
The company was founded in Delaware in 1983 as The Care Group, Inc., a home health care provider offering nursing services, home infusion therapy and durable medical equipment. Ann T. Mittasch served as chairman from 1984 and as president and chief executive from 1984 to 1996. Its common stock was quoted on the Nasdaq under the symbol CARE. The Care Group filed for Chapter 11 bankruptcy protection in September 1998 and emerged in February 1999, at which point it changed its name to Allion Healthcare, Inc. and refocused its business principally on serving HIV/AIDS patients.

Allion completed an initial public offering on June 22, 2005, selling 4 million shares at $13.00 per share on the Nasdaq under the ticker symbol ALLI.

In October 2009, the company was acquired by the private equity firm HIG Capital for $6.60/share in a deal valued at $278 million.

The MOMS Pharmacy division of Allion Healthcare was acquired by the AIDS Healthcare Foundation in 2012.

== Acquisitions ==
Allion Healthcare completed the acquisition of Priority Pharmacy in January 2006.

In December 2024, Biomed America was acquired for $171 million.

== 2012 indictment ==
On April 4, 2012, the office of New York Attorney General Eric T. Schneiderman charged four individuals associated with Medical Arts Pharmacy, a Bronx subsidiary of Allion in a Money Laundering & Bribery Scheme claiming the company sold blackmarket drugs "of unknown origin and potency, and in some cases, drugs that were mislabeled or potentially expired." According to the complaint: To date none of such has been proven.

In September 2008, Glenn Schabel, the supervising pharmacist and compliance officer for Allion, began ordering in excess of $274 million worth of alleged black market HIV medications from various licensed wholesalers over a 4 year period as directed by executive management. The Attorney General claimed such medications were obtained by various illegal means and the batches may have included unused pills that had previously been dispensed to individuals, medications stolen from manufacturers, or drugs that had expired, even though they were provided in legitimate manufacturers bottles. None of these claims have been proven to date even after hundreds of bottles were analyzed. The wholesalers were controlled by Stephen Manuel Costa, a 27-year-old Florida resident who incorporated four separate entities as licensed “wholesale” distributors, allegedly in order to disguise the sale of the diverted medications. It is also alleged that Costa furnished millions of the black market HIV medications to various entities including MOMS who dispensed the medications to their patients, many of whom were Medicaid recipients. Allion, under the direction of corporate management, continued to bill Medicaid, claiming no knowledge that the drugs were purchased illegally.

The indictment said at least $155 million in false claims were associated with the charge.
