= Lawyers Have Heart =

Annual American Heart Association fundraiser

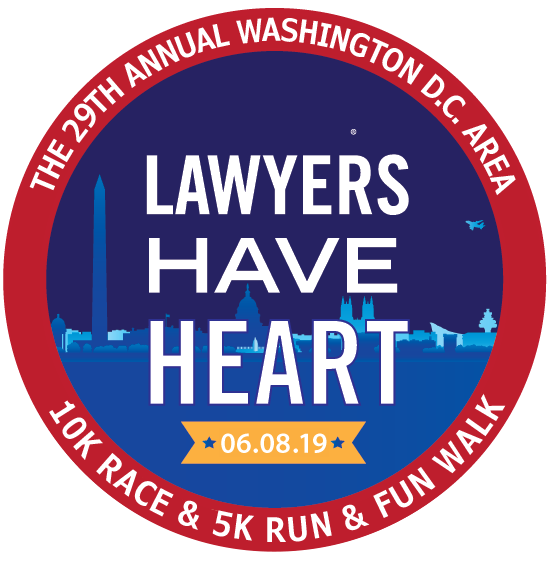
- 2019 logo
- Company type: Non-Profit
- Founded: 1991 in Washington, D.C.
- Founder: Richard Frank and Alan Raul
- Website: Lawyers Have Heart DC

Lawyers Have Heart 10K Race, 5K Run and Fun Walk is an annual event that raises money for the research and community education programs of the greater Washington D.C. region affiliate of the American Heart Association (AHA). The event brings together law firms, in house counsel, government attorneys, legal vendors, residents, parents, children and athletes of all levels of experience, to raise awareness and public consciousness regarding heart disease and stroke. Since its inception in 1991, Lawyers Have Heart has raised over $13 million to benefit the AHA and further its mission to be a relentless force for a world of longer, healthier lives. LHH is now one of the largest annual philanthropic endeavors supported by the greater DC legal community and has grown to become the area's largest 10K race. The event has a fundraising goal of $1.5 million for the 2023 event taking place on Saturday, May 20 at 8:00 AM in Washington, D.C.

== History ==
LHH was founded nearly 30 years ago by two Washington lawyers: Richard Frank, founder and senior principal of OFW Law and Alan Raul, partner at Sidley Austin LLP. When John W. Sansing published a 1990 cover article in the Washingtonian (magazine) entitled "First, Kill All the Lawyers," Frank decided to take action to improve the public image of lawyers by creating LHH. Frank recruited Raul, then general counsel to the United States Department of Agriculture, to assist him in the endeavor. As a longtime runner whose father was afflicted with heart disease, Frank saw the race as "a double good" – to raise money for the AHA and "show that the Washington legal community has some heart." In 1994, First National Bank of Maryland recognized Frank with the "Exceeding the Expected" award, given to one volunteer each year in the legal community who best exhibits “the willingness to give something back, to do more, to go beyond the expected.”

The first annual Lawyers Have Heart 10K Run and Fun Walk took place on May 19, 1991, and featured two Olympic marathon trials qualifiers in Darrell General and Jim Hage. After just one mile, General and Hage were in a head-to-head battle as they outpaced the trailing runners. The final decision was down to the wire, with General taking the honors by 13 seconds, 30:45 to 30:58. Linda Portazikc, of Arlington, Virginia, was the first woman to cross the finish line that year, establishing a mark of 36:47.

The longest-standing record on the LHH books was set the following year, in 1992, by Charlotte Thomas, of Baltimore, Maryland, with a time of 34:42.

Philippe Rolly is the only four-time winner of the LHH 10K. Beginning in 1999, when he moved from Lyon, France, to the Washington area, he was victorious in three consecutive races with times of 32:22, 31:34, and 30:49. Rolly also won in 2004 with a mark of 31:23. Donna Moore, of Silver Spring, MD, became the first woman to win twice after first-place finishes in 1999 (37:22) and 2001 (37:17).

In 2018, Lawyers Have Heart offered a $20,000 purse, attracting local and international talent. This resulted in two record breaking 10K times in the male and female elite divisions (Andrew Colley (28:45) & Etagegn Woldu Mamo (33:13)). In addition, Olympian hopeful Demssew Abebe, participated in the 2018 race.

The race has grown substantially over time, along with the proportion of female participants. In 1992, women accounted for 32% (333) of the 1,038 runners who crossed the finish line whereas, in 2018, women comprised 55% of the 5,500 finishers.

During LHH's first two years, the race was held in West Potomac Park, Washington, DC. In 1993, however, the race shifted to a hilly area in the Georgetown neighborhood of Washington, where it would remain until 2002, when the direction of the course was reversed in order to avoid such hilly terrain.

Lawyers Have Heart Executive Leadership Team (ELT) Chairs:

2022 ELT Co-Chairs

John Harrity, Partner, Harrity & Harrity

David Jaffe, Associate Dean of Student Affairs, American University College of Law

2019 ELT Co-Chairs

Affie Ambrose, Acumen Solutions, Inc., General Counsel & Lori Sher, E*TRADE Financial Corporation, General Counsel

2018 ELT Co-Chairs

Emily Wang Murphy, Thompson Coburn LLP, Partner & Eric Reicin, MorganFranklin Consulting, vice president, general counsel and corporate secretary

2017 ELT Chair

Eric Reicin, MorganFranklin Consulting, vice president, general counsel and corporate secretary

2016 ELT Chair

Leslie Thornton, WGL Holdings, Inc. & Washington Gas, senior vice president, general counsel and corporate secretary

2015 ELT Co-Chairs

Richard Frank, OFW Law, Senior Principal Attorney

Alan Raul, Sidley Austin, LLP, Partner

== Event ==
The original and largest LHH event is the annual Lawyers Have Heart 10K, 5K, and Fun Walk in Washington, D.C., with over 5,500 runners and walkers participating in 2018. Relatively flat and scenic, the race course begins and ends at the Washington Harbour, in the Georgetown neighborhood of Washington, D.C., and follows the Potomac River past many historic sites. Walkers start at the same location as the race does, immediately following the runners. However, their course only follows the Potomac River to the Lincoln Memorial, before returning to the Washington Harbour. Baby joggers, strollers, and pets are welcome on the walking course. Following the race, there is a Finish Line Festival at the Washington Harbour, and participants and spectators can enjoy refreshments, music, giveaways and prizes provided by friends and sponsors of LHH.

=== Other LHH Races ===
The success of the Lawyers Have Heart 10K and Fun Walk has led to the launch of similar LHH races, some of which are affiliated with the AHA around the country, such as in Boston, MA, where the fourth annual Lawyers Have Heart 5K Road Race and Summer Celebration was held on Thursday, June 9, 2011, at the Bank of America Pavilion. Other cities that have held Lawyers Have Heart races include San Diego, CA, Fresno, CA, and West Palm Beach, FL.
