= Douglas I. Foy =

Douglas I. Foy (born c. 1947) is an environmental advocate and former president of the Conservation Law Foundation. In 2003, former Massachusetts Governor Mitt Romney appointed Foy to the new post of Chief of Commonwealth Development. Romney instructed Foy "to devise an environmentally-friendly 'smart growth' plan for the state and (initially) back[ed] Foy when he trie[d] to organize a greenhouse gas emissions accord among several Northeast states." Foy resigned in February 2006. While in office, he helped design the Regional Greenhouse Gas Initiative which Romney refused to sign on to because of its potential impact on businesses and consumers.

Foy is a founder and CEO of Serrafix, a strategic consulting firm focused on environmental, energy, transportation, and climate change issues. He currently serves on the corporate boards of Ameresco, Acumentrics, GreenerU, and RainBank; the non-profit boards of the Ocean Genome Legacy Foundation, Pioneer Institute, and Conservation Law Foundation; and the National Transportation Policy Project of the Bipartisan Policy Center. Foy also serves as a Legal Advisor to the nonprofit Fuel Freedom Foundation.

In 1992 President George H.W. Bush recognized Foy's work on energy efficiency with the President's Environmental and Conservation Challenge Award. In 2006, Foy was named the recipient of the national Woodrow Wilson Award for Public Service. Foy also received the Woodrow Wilson award from Princeton University for his public interest achievements.

Foy, a member of the 1968 USA Olympic Rowing Team and the 1969 USA National Rowing Team, graduated from Princeton University as a University Scholar in engineering and physics, attended Cambridge University in England as a Churchill Scholar in geophysics, and graduated from Harvard Law School.
