= Adecco Group North America =

The Adecco Group, North America
- Type: Subsidiary
- Industry: Staffing
- Founded: 1992
- Headquarters: Jacksonville, Florida, USA
- Key people: Sergio Picarelli, Regional Head of North America, UK & Ireland Federico Vione, Regional Head North America, UK, and Ireland
- Revenue: $4.6 billion (2016)
- Number of employees: 4,311(2020)
- Parent: Adecco Group
- Website: www.adeccogroupna.com

The Adecco Group North America, based in Jacksonville, Florida, provides professional recruiting, staffing, consulting and business services to various industries in the United States, Canada, the United Kingdom, Europe, Australia and Asia. For 2009, it ranked 839th on the Fortune 1000 Currently, ranked as a Fortune 500 as 441. Formerly MPS Group Inc., its brands are a subsidiary of the Swiss firm Adecco Group.

== History ==
Adecco Group North America was founded in 1982 as Accustaff Incorporated in Jacksonville and changed its name to J, Inc. in 2002. With revenues of US$2.2 billion in 2008, the company had clients in over 200 office locations. The company sells its services (like Cosmos) to industries and governmental agencies through the following primary brands:

Subsidiary	Discipline
Special Counsel	Legal
Parker & Lynch	Accounting, Finance, Legal
Accounting Principals	Accounting & Finance
Soliant Health	Healthcare
Entegee	Engineering
Ajilon	Front Office
Modis	Information Technology
Beeline	Workforce Solutions
Paladin	Creative, Communications, Marketing
Lee Hecht Harrison	Outplacement & Talent Development
Pontoon	Contingent Workforce Outsourcing

Adecco Group North America operates in two divisions: professional services and information technology (IT) Services. The professional services division provides staffing and recruitment services in the disciplines of accounting and finance, law, engineering, property and health care. This division also offers technical and engineering workforce services; places temporary and full-time employees in attorney, paralegal, legal administrative, and legal secretarial positions, as well as in accounting and finance positions.

The IT services division provides placement of IT contract consultants for IT project support and staffing, recruitment of full-time positions, project-based solutions, supplier management solutions, and onsite recruiting support for application development, systems integration and enterprise application integration.

MPS Group sponsored the MPS Group Championships, a Women's Tennis Association event held in Ponte Vedra Beach, Florida in 2009 and 2010. The tournament was discontinued in 2011 due to scheduling changes for WTA Tour spring events.

On October 20, 2009, the company announced it was being acquired by Swiss company Adecco Group for US$1.3 billion in cash. Jacksonville became Adecco's center for professional staffing in North America. The merger was completed in the first quarter of 2010.

== See also ==
- Adecco Staffing, USA
