= Timeline of the Deepwater Horizon oil spill (May 2010) =

Following is a Timeline of the Deepwater Horizon oil spill for May 2010.

== May ==
=== May 1–5 ===
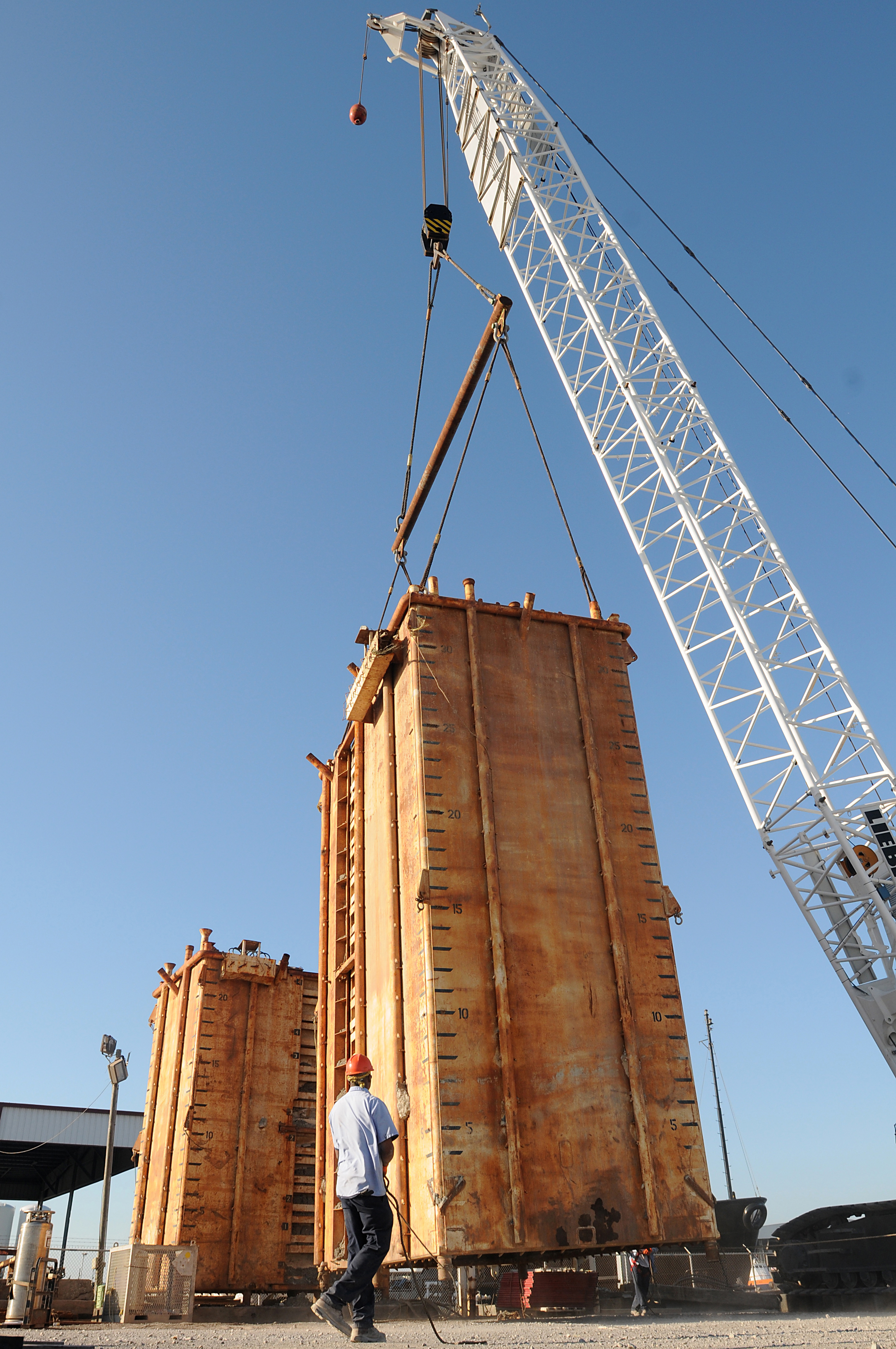
Cofferdam containment dome under construction at Wild Well Control in Port Fourchon, Louisiana on April 26.

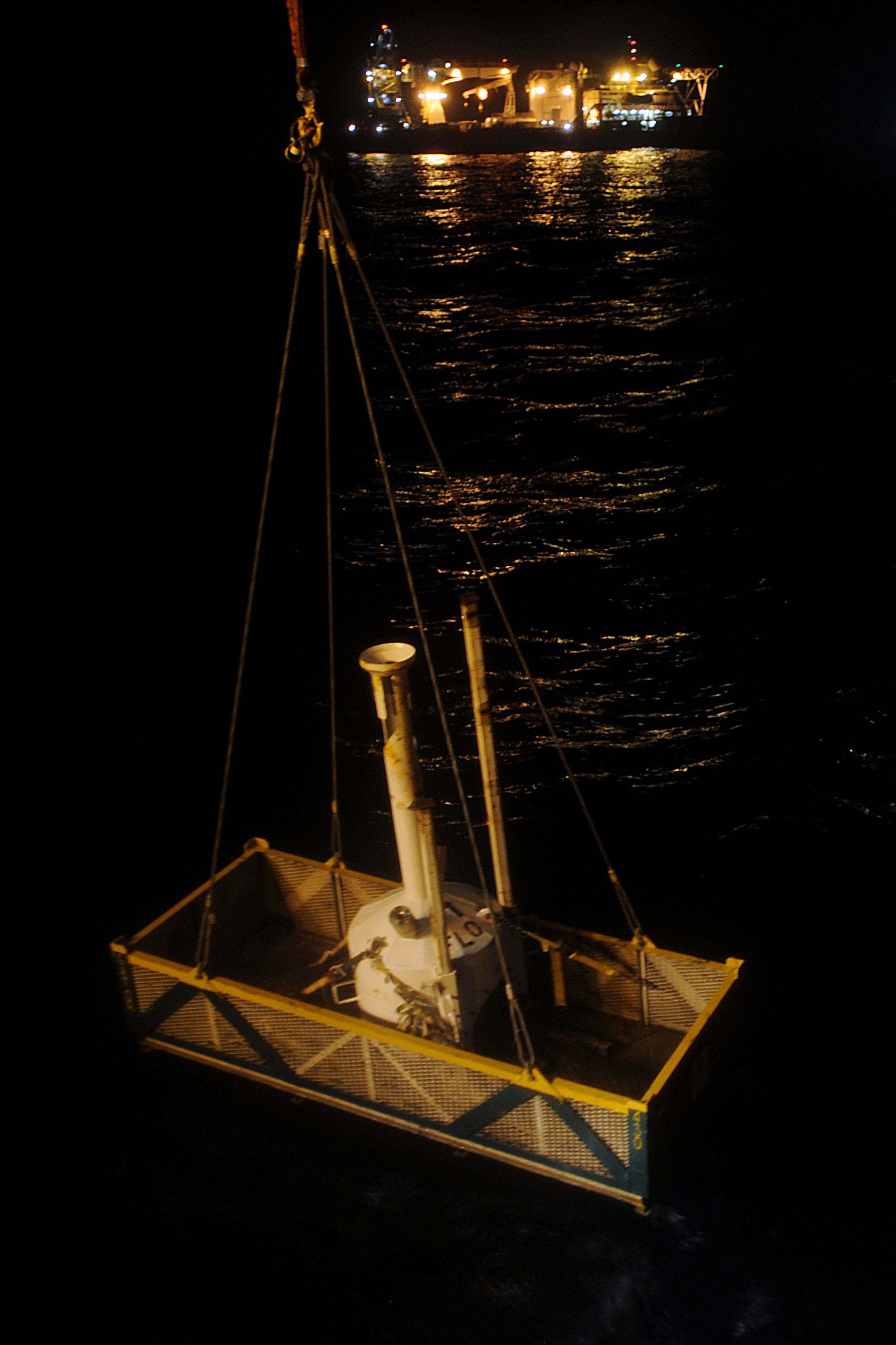
"Top Hat" being deployed on May 11.

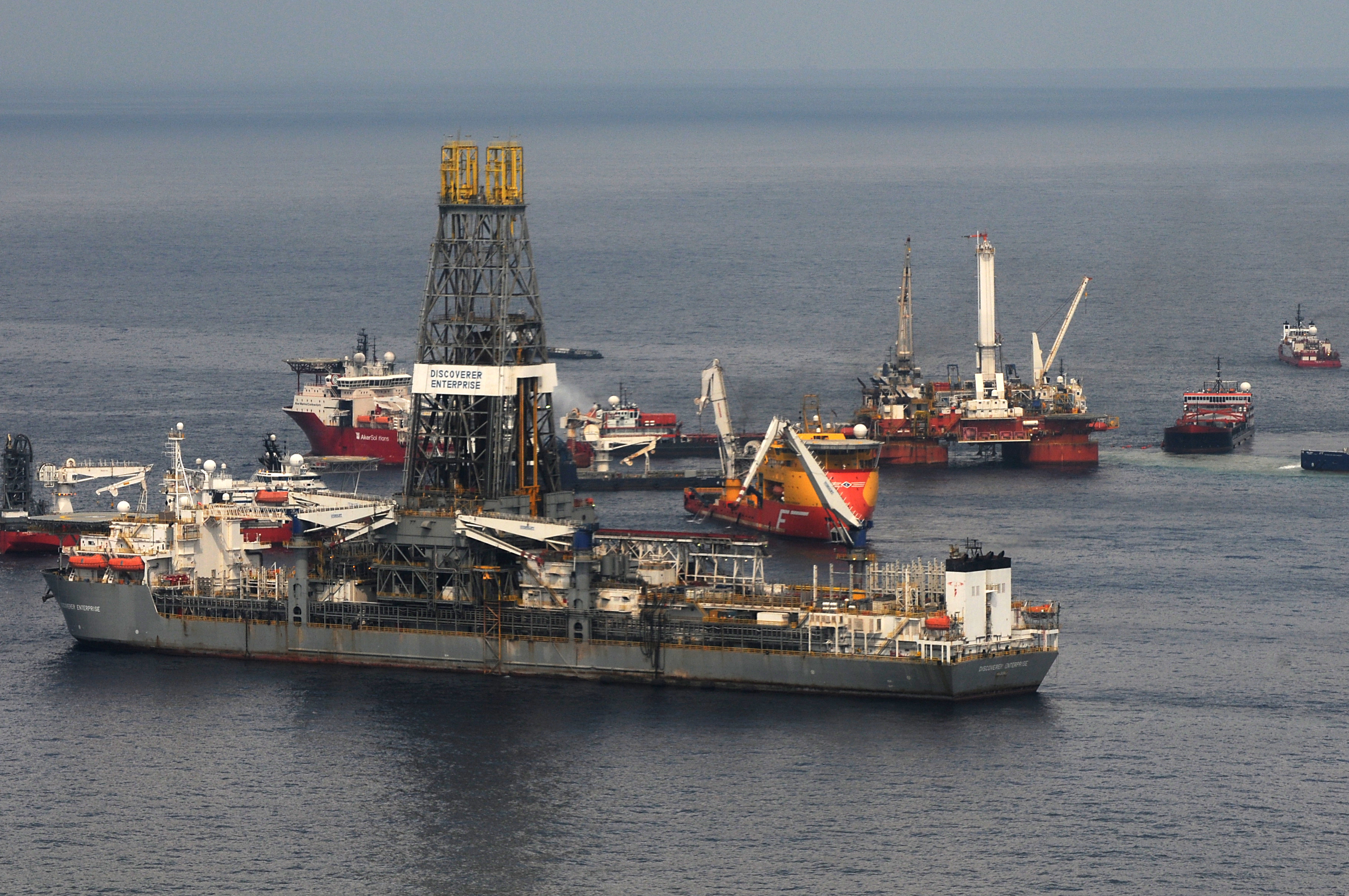
Q4000 in back right and the Discoverer Enterprise in the foreground on May 26 during the failed top kill procedure. The Q4000 is directly over the blowout preventer.

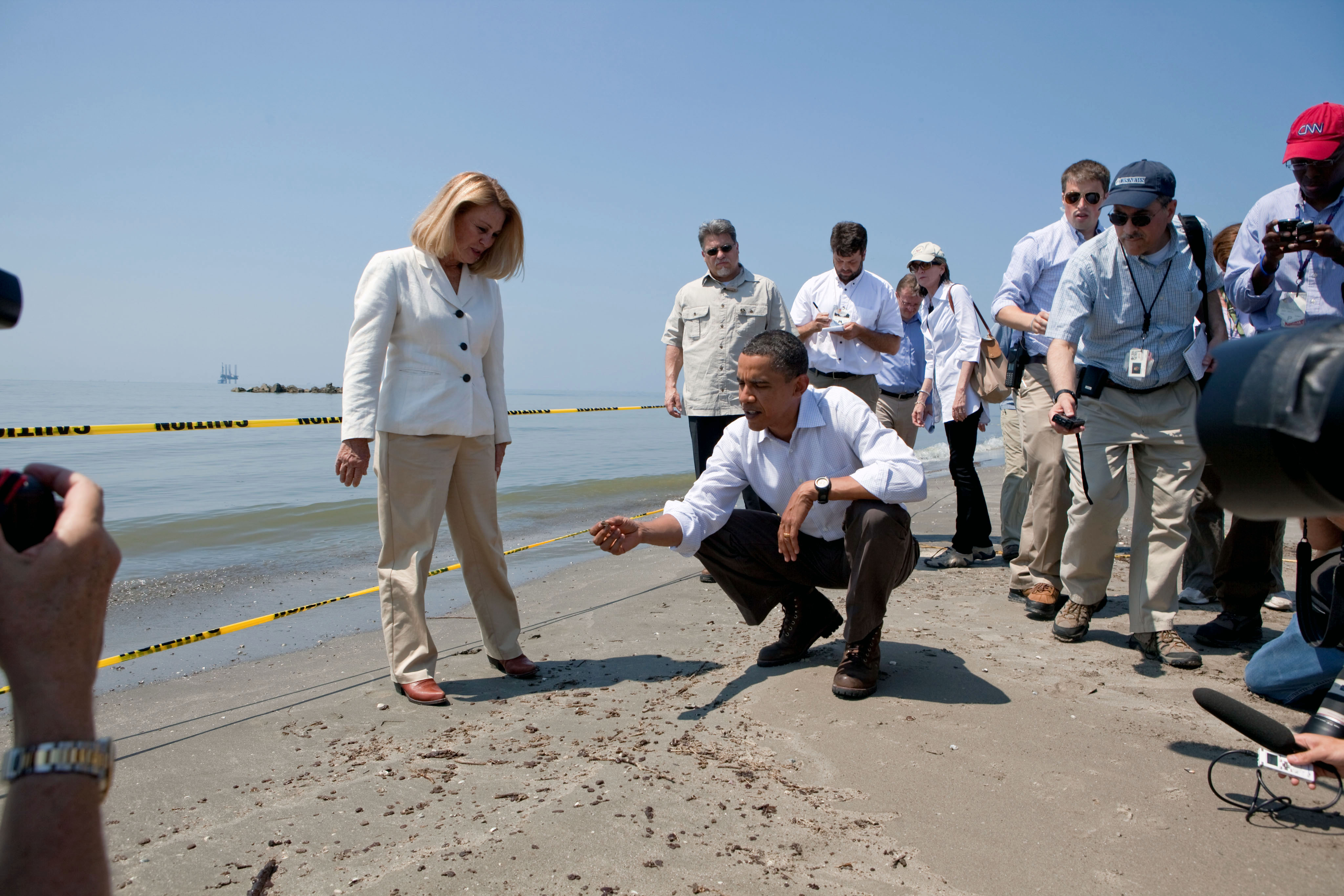
Lafourche Parish, Louisiana President Charlotte Randolf and President Obama inspect tarballs on Port Fourchon, Louisiana beach on May 28.

- May 1

- Two military C-130 Hercules aircraft were employed to spray oil dispersant.

- May 2

- Obama meets with fishermen and Coast Guard in Venice, Louisiana. Oil discovered in the South Pass.
- Transocean's Development Driller III started drilling a first relief well. High winds and rough waves rendered oil-catching booms largely ineffective.

- May 3

- BP says it will pay cleanup costs. Fishing areas remain closed.
- Shares of Nalco Holding Company jump 18% in one day after it is revealed its dispersant products are being use for cleanup.

- May 4

- BP proposes a containment dome.

- May 5

- BP announces that the smallest of three known leaks had been capped allowing the repair group to focus their efforts on the remaining leaks.

=== May 6–10 ===
- May 6

- Oil sheen discovered in south end of Chandeleur Chain.

- May 7

- A 125-tonne (276,000 lb) container dome is lowered over the largest of the well leaks and pipe the oil to a storage vessel on the surface.
- BP begins drilling a relief well.
- BP closing stock price 49.06
- Breton National Wildlife Refuge closed to public.
- Secretary Alan Levine of the Louisiana Department of Health and Hospitals, Louisiana Department of Environmental Quality Secretary Peggy Hatch, and Louisiana Department of Wildlife and Fisheries Secretary Robert Barham sent a letter to BP outlining their concerns related to potential dispersant impact on Louisiana's wildlife and fisheries, environment, aquatic life, and public health. Officials requested that BP release information on their dispersant effects.

- May 8

- BP reports that methane is freezing at the top of the dome making it ineffective.
- Unified Command noting low level flights above Breton National Wildlife Refuge issues press release reminding the media that low level flights above wildlife refuges is prohibited by law above all refuges.

- May 9

- Tar balls reported on Dauphin Island in Alabama.

- May 10

- After failed containment dome BP announces plans to apply five feet in diameter containment vessel nicknamed "top hat". BP announced strategy of trying to push mud and debris down the tube to clog it. The strategy was nicknamed "junk shot."

=== May 11–15 ===
- May 11

- BP, Transocean and Halliburton officials testify before Congress blaming each other for the incident.
- MMS and Coast Guard Joint Investigation Team chaired by USCG Capt. Hung Nguyen and MMS employee David Dykes begin a Joint Marine Board of Investigation into the accident holding the first hearings at the Crowne Plaza Hotel in Kenner, Louisiana where they interview survivors. The investigation is to report its findings in nine months from its convening on April 27.
- BP in its regulatory filing says a blowout in its relief well could result in a release of 240,000 barrels a day.

- May 12

- BP releases first public video of leak and others say the leak is significantly higher than what BP has been saying. One estimate says it could to be 20,000–100,000 barrels (840,000–4,200,000 US gallons; 3,200–15,900 cubic metres) a day.
- MMS reports that after re-inspecting all deepwater oil and gas facilities on the outer Continental Shelf it had found no major violations.
- More than 70 lawsuits have been filed against BP.

- May 13

- Tony Hayward calls the oil spill "relatively tiny" in comparison with the size of the "ocean."
- Transocean files in the U.S. District Court for the Southern District of Texas to limit its liability under the Limitation of Shipowner's Liability Act to just its interest in the Deepwater Horizon which it values at $26,764,083, Transocean said 100 lawsuits had been filed against it.

- May 14

- BP inserted a 4-inch (100 mm) wide riser into the 21-inch-wide burst pipe. It was initially dislodged when an underwater robot collides with the pipe. The stock price of BP was $48.6/share.

- May 15

- Construction of a new permanent riser to replace the temporary riser begins. The installation for the new riser is targeted for June 15.
- Coast Guard and EPA authorize use dispersants underwater, at the source of the Deepwater Horizon leak.

=== May 16–20 ===
- May 16

- A new tube is inserted into the pipe and some oil is pumped to surface ship. Transocean's GSF Development Driller II started drilling second relief well.

- May 17

- BP begins burning off gas with the Discoverer Enterprise.
- BP says it will release a live feed of the leak hours after receiving a request from Congressman Edward Markey. Supporting his position is Steve Wereley from Purdue University who says the leak may be 70,000 barrels (2,900,000 US gallons; 11,000,000 litres) a day. BP America President Lamar McKay defends the company's estimates noting the higher estimates are "theoretically possible...But I don't think anyone who's been working on this thinks it's that high."
- Chris Oynes, Regional Director for the Gulf of Mexico Outer Continental Shelf, announces his early retirement from the MMS.

- May 18

- BP CEO Tony Hayward stated at its respond to Ken Salazar that the environmental impact of the oil spill in the Gulf of Mexico would be "very, very modest".

- May 19

- Oil washes ashore on mainland Louisiana.
- Salazar signs a Secretarial Order dividing MMS into three separate divisions: Bureau of Ocean Energy Management reporting to Assistant Secretary for Land and Minerals Management, Bureau of Safety and Environmental Enforcement reporting to Assistant Secretary for Land and Minerals Management, Office of Natural Resources Revenue reporting to Assistant Secretary for Policy, Management, and Budget.
- Coast Guard labs report that tar balls that washed up at Fort Zachary Taylor State Park in Key West, Florida are not from the spill.

- May 20

- The EPA tells BP to find a new dispersant to replace Corexit EC9500A and Corexit EC9527A that are either comparable or 10 to 20 times more toxic than 12 other dispersants on the EPA's approved list. BP applied 650,000 gallons of the chemical that breaks up oil since the spill began. Corexit is manufactured by Nalco Holding Company which has ties to BP and ExxonMobil.

=== May 21–25 ===
- May 21

- BP begins live underwater video broadcasts of the leak.
- BP closing stock price 44.58 following pressure from Congressman Ed Markey.
- Flow Rate Technical Group established to "scientifically validated information about the amount of oil flowing from BP s leaking oil well." The average daily oil collection rates is 2,000 barrels (84,000 US gallons; 320,000 litres) a day.

- May 22

- Obama signs an executive order establishing the bipartisan National Commission on the BP Deepwater Horizon Oil Spill and Offshore Drilling, with former Florida Governor and Senator Bob Graham and former Environmental Protection Agency Administrator William K. Reilly serving as co-chairs. The purpose of the commission is to "consider the root causes of the disaster and offer options on safety and environmental precautions."

- May 23

- BP rebuffs EPA order to change its dispersants. BP says that if oil reaches the shore, it would do more environmental harm than if it were dispersed off the coast. It notes that corexit is the only product that is available in sufficient quantities to deal with the spill. Further BP which has now deployed a third of the world's dispersant supply against the spill said suggesting alternatives (or even detailing the chemicals that make up corexit) would expose confidential business information which it legally can keep private.

- May 24

- BP says it currently has no plans to use explosives on the well. It also flatly denies it ever considered using a nuclear bomb on the well as some suggested.
- Tom Sesler an official blogger on the BP website reporting from Houma (30 miles north of the Gulf) says, "Much of the region's other businesses - particularly the hotels - have been prospering because so many people have come here from BP and other oil emergency response teams."

- May 25

- BP official says BP would like to retrieve the 325 ton blow out equipment from the sunk Deepwater Horizon. Transocean confirmed it will meet the legal obligations of a dividend that was approved at the annual general meeting on May 14, 2010
- Transocean holds memorial at the Jackson Convention Center in Jackson, Mississippi for crew members.

=== May 26–31 ===
- May 26

- BP announces plan to force feed heavy drilling mud in a project called "top kill".
- Doug Brown, the chief mechanic on the Deepwater Horizon, testifies at the joint U.S. Coast Guard and Minerals Management Service hearing that a BP representative overruled Transocean employees and insisted on displacing protective drilling mud with seawater just hours before the explosion.

- May 27

- Obama announced a six-month moratorium on new deepwater oil drilling permits in 500 feet of water or more. Deepwater rigs lease for between $250,000 and $500,000 a day and employ between 800 and 1,400 during the initial drilling. The moratorium affected 33 wells owned by the following companies: Royal Dutch Shell (5 rigs), Eni (3), Marathon Oil (3), Anadarko Petroleum (3), Equinor (2), Chevron Corporation (2), Noble Corporation (2), Devon Energy (2). BP (2), BHP (2), Hess Corporation (1), LLOG Exploration (1), Walter Energy (1), Petrobras (1), ATP Oil and Gas (1), Newfield Exploration (1), and Nexen (1)).
- Based on the oil flow estimates by the Flow Rate Technical Group, the United States government increased its estimate at 12,000 to 19,000 barrels (500,000 to 800,000 US gallons; 1,900,000 to 3,000,000 litres) per day.
- Elizabeth Birnbaum resigns from MMS.

- May 28

- Obama visits Louisiana again.
- In a regulatory filing, BP claims to have spent a total of $930 million.
- BP closing stock price 42.95
- Bureau of Land Management Director Bob Abbey named interim director.
- Obama reverses a Fall 2009 position and authorizes the International Association of Drilling Contractors to visit Cuba. Repsol YPF had a 5-year lease to begin exploratory drilling off the Cuban coast in Gulf of Mexico deepwater later in 2010. The United States embargo against Cuba forbids economic ties between the countries. Newspaper articles noted that if there were an accident U.S. companies could not legally provide assistance.

- May 29

- BP declared Top Kill as a failure and moved on to the Lower Marine Riser Package (LMRP) Cap Containment System. The operational plan first involves cutting and then removing the damaged drilling riser from the top of the failed Blow-Out Preventer (BOP) to leave a cleanly cut pipe at the top of the BOP's LMRP. The cap is designed to be connected to a riser from the Discoverer Enterprise drillship and placed over the LMRP with the intention of capturing most of the oil and gas flowing from the well. During the cutting of the pipe, the diamond blade saw became stuck but was eventually freed later. BP had to use shears instead and the cut is "ragged", meaning the cap will be harder to fit.

- May 30

- New Orleans Times-Picayune published an article outlining the difficulties of using relief wells noting that the wells first have to hit the original well bore that is only a foot wide and then has to make sure it can control the output once it hits the well bore so that it doesn't create a duplicate problem. The original well has already shown it has unpredictable gas bubbles. It notes the Ixtoc I oil spill which was finally stopped by the two relief well approach after nine months and 22 days. Ixtoc was in 150 feet of water and had a depth of 11,625 feet.

- May 31

- BP announces plan to slice the leaking pipe, placing a cap on it and channeling the oil to surface ships. Robert Reich writes a column on the Huffington Post saying the United States government should temporarily takeover BP much as it did with AIG and General Motors. He noted the government had a minimal ability to make BP do what the government wants or even report accurately on its actions.
