= Timeline of the Deepwater Horizon oil spill =

The following is a timeline of the Deepwater Horizon oil spill (also referred to as the BP oil spill, the Gulf of Mexico oil spill or the Macondo blowout). It was a massive oil spill in the Gulf of Mexico, the largest offshore spill in U.S. history. It was a result of the well blowout that began with the Deepwater Horizon drilling rig explosion on April 20, 2010.

== Background ==
=== 2008 ===
- March 2008 – The mineral rights to drill for oil at the Macondo well, located in Mississippi Canyon Block 252 in the United States sector of the Gulf of Mexico about 41 miles (66 km) off the Louisiana coast, were purchased by BP at the Minerals Management Service's (MMS) Lease Sale No. 206, held in New Orleans.

=== 2009 ===
- February – BP files a 52-page exploration and environmental impact plan for the Macondo well with the MMS. The plan stated that it was "unlikely that an accidental surface or subsurface oil spill would occur from the proposed activities". In the event an accident did take place the plan stated that due to the well being 48 miles (77 km) from shore and the response capabilities that would be implemented, no significant adverse impacts would be expected.
- April 6 – The Department of the Interior exempted BP's Gulf of Mexico drilling operation from a detailed environmental impact study after concluding that a massive oil spill was unlikely.
- June 22 – Mark E. Hafle, a senior drilling engineer at BP, warns that the metal casing for the blowout preventer might collapse under high pressure.
- October 7 – The Transocean Marianas semi-submersible rig begins drilling the Macondo well.
- November 9 – Hurricane Ida damages Transocean Marianas enough that it has to be replaced.

== 2010 events ==
=== February ===
- February 15, 2010 – Deepwater Horizon drilling rig, owned by Transocean, begins drilling on the Macondo Prospect. The planned well was to be drilled to 18,000 feet (5,500 m) below sea level, and was to be plugged and suspended for subsequent completion as a subsea producer.

=== March ===
- March 8 – Target date for the completion of the well which had been budgeted to cost $96 million.
- March 17 – BP Chief Tony Hayward sells one third of his BP stock (223,288 shares). Closing BP price on March 17 on the New York Stock Exchange is 58.15.
- March – An accident damages a gasket on the blowout preventer on the rig.

=== April ===
Fighting the fire on April 21

- April 1 – Halliburton employee Marvin Volek warns that BP's use of cement "was against our best practices."
- April 6 – MMS issues permit to BP for the well with the notation, "Exercise caution while drilling due to indications of shallow gas and possible water flow."
- April 9 – BP drills last section with the wellbore 18,360 feet (5,600 m) below sea level but the last 1,192 feet (363 m) needs casing. Halliburton recommends liner/tieback casing that will provide 4 redundant barriers to flow. BP chooses to do a single liner with fewer barriers that is faster to install and cheaper ($7 to $10 million).
- April 14 – Brian Morel, a BP drilling engineer, emails a colleague "this has been a nightmare well which has everyone all over the place."
- April 15 – Morel informs Halliburton executive Jesse Gagliano that they plan to use 6 centralizers. Gagliano says they should use 21. Morel replies in an email, "it's too late to get any more product on the rig, our only option is to rearrange placement of these centralizers." Gagliano also recommends to circulate the drilling mud from the bottom of the well all the way up to the surface to remove gas pockets and debris which can contaminate the cement, saying in an email, "at least circulate one bottoms up on the well before doing a cement job." Despite this recommendation, BP cycles only 261 barrels (41.5 m^{3}) of mud, a fraction of the total mud used in the well.
- April 15 – MMS approves amended permit for BP to use a single liner with fewer barriers.
- April 16 – Brett Cocales, BP's Operations Drilling Engineer, emails drilling engineer Brian Morel confirming the 6 centralizer approach, saying six should be adequate to obtain a proper cement seal in the well. "Who cares, it's done, end of story, will probably be fine and we'll get a good cement job," he wrote, according to a copy of the e-mail cited in court papers. (Halliburton was the cement provider.)
- April 17 – Deepwater Horizon completes its drilling and the well is being prepared to be cemented so that another rig will retrieve the oil. The blowout preventer is tested and found to be "functional." Gagliano now reports that using only 6 centralizers "would likely produce channeling and a failure of the cement job."
- April 18 – Gagliano's report says "well is considered to have a severe gas flow problem." Schlumberger flies a crew to conduct a cement bond log to determine whether the cement has bonded to the casing and surrounding formations. It is required in rules.
- April 19 – Halliburton completes cementing of the final production liner string.
- April 20 –

- 7 am – BP cancels a recommended cement bond log test. Conducting the test would have taken 9–12 hours and $128,000. By canceling the cement test BP paid only $10,000. Crew leaves on 11:15 am flight. BP officials gather on the platform to celebrate seven years without an injury on the rig. The planned moving of the Deepwater Horizon to another location was 43 days past due and the delay had cost BP $21 million.

- 9:49 pm (CDT) – Andrea Fleytas had been monitoring the dynamic positioning system on the bridge of the Horizon when she felt a jolt. Before she could make sense of it – a rig shaking shock that came out of nowhere – magenta warnings began flashing on her screen. Magenta meant the most dangerous level of combustible gas intrusion.

- 9:56 pm CDT – Gas from the wellbore erupts through the rig floor and then catches fire. The explosion kills 11 platform workers and injures 17 others; another 98 people survive without serious physical injury.

- April 21 – Coast Guard rear admiral Mary Landry is named Federal On Scene Coordinator. Coast Guard log reports "Potential environmental threat is 700,000 gallons of diesel on board the Deepwater Horizon and estimated potential of 8,000 barrels per day of crude oil, if the well were to completely blowout. Most of the current pollution has been mitigated by the fire. There is some surface sheening extending up to 2 miles from the source." The log also reports that two attempts to shut the BOP using an ROV have failed.
- April 22 10:21 am – Rig sinks. CNN quote Coast Guard Petty Officer Ashley Butler as saying that "oil was leaking from the rig at the rate of about 8,000 barrels (340,000 US gallons; 1,300 cubic metres) of crude per day." 100,000 US gallons (380,000 litres) of dispersants are pre-authorized by the United States Environmental Protection Agency (EPA) and placed in position even though there is no sign of a leak. Three Norwegian crews from Ocean Intervention III from Oceaneering International, Skandi Neptune from DOF ASA, and Boa Sub C (from Boa International) begin using remotely operated underwater vehicles (ROV) to map the seabed and assess the damage to the wreck. The crews report "large amounts of oil that flowed out."
- April 23 – Coast Guard rear adm. Mary Landry tells CBS "At this time, there is no crude emanating from that wellhead at the ocean surface, er, at the ocean floor...There is not oil emanating from the riser either." Unified Command begins operating out of the Royal Dutch Shell Training and Conference Center in Robert, Louisiana. Search and rescue suspended at 5 pm. Eleven of the 126 people on the rig have perished. Coast Guard log reports, "BP will establish an ICP at Houma, Louisiana today to monitor the response and prepare for potential release estimated potential of 64,000- 110,000 bbls (2 ,688,000- 4,620,000 gal) per day of crude oil if the well were to completely blowout."
- April 24 – In accordance with the existing in situ burn plans, the OSC determined in situ burning was a viable response method for several reasons. First, weather and sea-state did not allow continuous skimming and alternatives were needed. Second, skimmers and dispersants could not completely remove the oil being released from the well. Finally, the OSC determined in situ burning (ISB) was a safe and effective way to remove large volumes of oil from the ocean surface, based on data for in situ burns from previous spills.

BP reports a leak 1,000 barrels (42,000 US gallons; 160 cubic metres) a day. The DeepWaterHorizonResponse.com domain is registered for one year by PIER Systems in Bellingham, Washington to be used by the United States Coast Guard and other reporting agencies. Price of a barrel of oil (West Texas Intermediate – Cushing, Oklahoma) is $84.34.

- April 25 – Oil sheen seen covering 580 square miles (1,500 km^{2}) and is 70 miles (110 km) south of Mississippi and Alabama coastlines and was 31 miles (50 km) from the ecologically sensitive Chandeleur Islands. BP begins process to establish two relief wells.
- April 26 – Oil reported 36 miles (58 km) southeast of Louisiana. Booms set up to keep oil from washing ashore. A huge containment chamber is moved to Superior Energy Services subsidiary Wild Well Control in Port Fourchon, Louisiana. BP closing stock price 57.91 Coast Guard log reports "attempts to actuate the blow preventer (BOP) middle rams and blind shears were ineffective due to a hydraulic leak on the valve. Repairs are being worked overnight. The well head continues to discharge approximately 1,000 barrels/day.
- April 27 – Slick grows to 100 miles (160 km) across and 20 miles (32 km) from Louisiana coast.
- April 28 – National Oceanic and Atmospheric Administration estimated that the leak was likely 5,000 barrels (210,000 US gallons; 790 cubic metres) a day, five times larger than initially estimated by BP. BP announces controlled test to burn oil off the surface was successful. Oil is 20 miles (32 km) east of the mouth of the Mississippi River. MMS postpones 2010 Offshore Industry Safety Awards scheduled to be May 3.
- April 29 – Louisiana Governor Bobby Jindal declares a state of emergency. 100,000 feet (30 km) of containment booms were deployed along the coast. By the next day, this nearly doubled to 180,000 feet (55 km) of deployed booms, with an additional 300,000 feet (91 km) staged or being deployed.
- April 30 – Oil washes ashore at Venice, Louisiana. President Barack Obama halts new offshore drilling unless safeguards are in place. – Coast Guard issues subpoena to Transocean "to maintain the blowout preventer and to not allow anyone or anything to tamper with it" without the Guard's permission. EPA establishes its website for its response. Sanford Bernstein estimates capping the leaks and cleaning up the spill may cost $12.5 billion. On April 30, the United States House Committee on Energy and Commerce asked Halliburton to brief it as well as provide any documents it might have related to its work on the Macondo well.
- April 30 – Florida Governor Charlie Crist declares a state of emergency for 6 counties.

=== May ===
- May 2 – President Obama meets with fishermen and Coast Guard in Venice, Louisiana. Oil discovered in the South Pass. Transocean's Development Driller III starts drilling a first relief well.
- May 3 – Shares of Nalco Holding Company jump 18% in one day after it is revealed that its dispersant products are being used for the cleanup.
- May 3 – Florida Governor Charlie Crist extends emergency declaration to 19 counties.
- May 5 – BP announces that the smallest of three known leaks had been capped allowing the repair group to focus their efforts on the remaining leaks.
- May 6 – Oil sheen discovered in south end of Chandeleur Chain.
- May 7 – A 125-tonne (276,000 lb) containment dome is lowered over the largest of the well leaks and pipe the oil to a storage vessel on the surface.
- May 7 – Florida enters into an initial agreement with BP, providing for $25 million in emergency funding. Further grants by BP follow over time.
- May 8 – BP reports that methane is freezing at the top of the dome making it ineffective.
- May 9 – Tar balls reported on Dauphin Island in Alabama.
- May 10 – After failed containment dome BP announces plans to apply five feet in diameter containment vessel nicknamed "top hat". BP announces strategy of trying to push mud and debris down the tube to clog it. The strategy is nicknamed "junk shot."
- May 11 – BP, Transocean and Halliburton officials testify before Congress blaming each other for the incident. MMS and Coast Guard Joint Investigation Team chaired by USCG Capt. Hung Nguyen and MMS employee David Dykes begin a Joint Marine Board of Investigation into the accident holding the first hearings at the Crowne Plaza Hotel in Kenner, Louisiana where they interview survivors.
- May 12 – BP releases first public video of leak and others say the leak is significantly higher than what BP has been saying. One estimate says it could to be 20,000–100,000 barrels (840,000–4,200,000 US gallons; 3,200–15,900 cubic metres) a day.
- May 13 – Tony Hayward calls the oil spill "relatively tiny" in comparison with the size of the "ocean." Transocean files in the U.S. District Court for the Southern District of Texas to limit its liability under the Limitation of Shipowner's Liability Act to just its interest in the Deepwater Horizon which it values at $26,764,083.
- May 14 – BP inserts 4-inch (100 mm) wide riser into the 21-inch-wide burst pipe. It is initially dislodged when an underwater robot collides with the pipe.
- May 15 – Coast Guard and EPA authorize use dispersants underwater, at the source of the Deepwater Horizon leak.
- May 16 – GSF Development Driller II starts drilling second relief well.
- May 17 – BP begins burning off gas with the Discoverer Enterprise. BP says it will release a live feed of the leak hours after receiving a request from Congressman Edward Markey. Supporting his position is Steve Wereley from Purdue University who says the leak may be 70,000 barrels (2,900,000 US gallons; 11,000,000 litres) a day.

Chris Oynes, offshore drilling director for the MMS, announces a hurried retirement.

- May 19 – Oil washes ashore on mainland Louisiana.
- May 21 – BP begins live underwater video broadcasts of the leak. Flow Rate Technical Group established for "scientifically validated information about the amount of oil flowing from BP s leaking oil well." The average daily oil collection rates is 2,000 barrels (84,000 US gallons; 320,000 litres) a day.
- May 22 – Obama signs an executive order establishing the bipartisan National Commission on the BP Deepwater Horizon Oil Spill and Offshore Drilling
- May 23 – BP rebuffs EPA order to change its dispersants. BP says that if oil reaches the shore, it would do more environmental harm than if it were dispersed off the coast. It notes that Corexit is the only product that is available in sufficient quantities to deal with the spill.
- May 24 – BP says it currently has no plans to use explosives on the well. It also flatly denies it ever considered using a nuclear bomb on the well as some suggested.
- May 26 – BP announces plan to force feed heavy drilling mud in a project called "top kill". Doug Brown, the chief mechanic on the Deepwater Horizon, testifies at the joint U.S. Coast Guard and Minerals Management Service hearing that a BP representative overruled Transocean employees and insisted on displacing protective drilling mud with seawater just hours before the explosion.
- May 27 – Obama announces a six-month moratorium on new deepwater oil drilling permits in 500 feet (150 m) of water or more. Based on the oil flow estimates by the Flow Rate Technical Group, the United States government increased its estimate at 12,000 to 19,000 barrels (500,000 to 800,000 US gallons; 1,900,000 to 3,000,000 litres) per day. Elizabeth Birnbaum resigns from MMS.
- May 28 – Obama visits Louisiana again.
- May 29 – BP declares Top Kill is a failure and moves on to their next contingency option, the Lower Marine Riser Package (LMRP) Cap Containment System.
- May 31 – BP announces plan to slice the leaking pipe, placing a cap on it and channeling the oil to surface ships.

=== June ===
- June 1 – Oil began washing up on the beaches of Gulf Islands National Seashore.
- June 4 – Tarballs arrive on beaches in Pensacola, Florida.
- June 5 – Obama makes third trip to Louisiana since the disaster began, visits Grand Isle, Louisiana for the second time in two weeks.
- June 6 – BP abandons plans to close three remaining vents on the containment cap noting that with one vent it is capturing as much oil as it can handle.
- June 8 – BP releases the requested high resolution images of the leak.
- June 9 – BP's chief operating officer Doug Suttles says the underwater plume is "in very minute quantities."
- June 11 – Flow Rate Technical Group says the leak could be 20,000 to 40,000 barrels (840,000 to 1,680,000 US gallons; 3,200,000 to 6,400,000 litres) of oil a day.
- June 13 - Florida temporarily closes a portion of coastal waters offshore of Escambia County to the harvest of saltwater fish, crabs and shrimp.
- June 15 – Obama in the first speech from the Oval Office of his presidency focuses on the spill.
- June 16 – Obama meets with Svanberg, Hayward, McKay. BP agrees to fund a $20 billion escrow account administered by Kenneth Feinberg.
- June 17 – Hayward addresses the United States House Energy Subcommittee on Oversight and Investigations.
- June 22 – Martin Leach-Cross Feldman of the United States District Court for the Eastern District of Louisiana issues restraining order in Hornbeck Offshore Services LLC v. Salazar against the 6-month moratorium on drilling in the Gulf waters of 500 feet (150 m) or more.
- June 23 – Oil appeared on Pensacola Beach and in Gulf Islands National Seashore, and officials warned against swimming for 33 miles (53 km) east of the Alabama line.
- June 25 – Hurricane Alex (2010) causes relief rigs to disconnect and let the oil spill unchecked into the ocean.

=== July ===
- July 1 – The supertanker A Whale, begins skimming tests at Boothville, Louisiana.
- July 2 – National Oceanic and Atmospheric Administration issues models of the probability of oil coming ashore based on historical winds and currents noting that oil may come ashore in the Keys and Miami.
- July 5 – Oil is reported at Rigolets raising fears it will hit Lake Pontchartrain.
- July 8 – United States Court of Appeals for the Fifth Circuit in 2–1 vote refuses to overturn oil drilling moratorium in Hornbeck Offshore Services LLC v. Salazar. Administration says it will issue a new moratorium.
- July 10 – Old cap removed from well at 12:37 p.m. CDT in preparation for a new cap. Oil is expected to flow unabated into the Gulf for 48 hours.
- July 12

- Three ram capping stack installed on the Deepwater Horizon LMRP at 7 p.m. CDT (0000 GMT). The stack completes the installation of the new 40-ton containment device sealing cap. Tests begin on testing well integrity.
- Salazar issues a new moratorium until November 30 on deepwater wells that use a blowout preventer.
- National Commission on the BP Deepwater Horizon Oil Spill and Offshore Drilling begins two days of hearings at the Hilton New Orleans Riverside

- July 15 – BP test cuts off all oil pouring into the Gulf at 2:25 p.m. However Thad Allen cautions that it is likely that containment operations will resume following the test.
- July 16 – A Whale will not join the containment process after tests show that its skimming operations were "negligible" in comparison to the much smaller and more nimble skimmers.
- July 18 – Allen sends Dudley a letter to provide "written procedure for opening the choke valve as quickly as possible" noting tests have "detected seep a distance from the well and undetermined anomalies at the well."
- July 19

- Kent Wells says BP is considering a "static kill" of the well using heavy mud bumped through the new cap in a process known as bullheading.
- Donald Vidrine, who was the ranking BP representative on Deepwater Horizon, citing ill health refuses to testify at Coast Guard hearing into the accident.

- July 22

- Ships and personnel leave the spill site as Tropical Storm Bonnie approaches.
- NOAA reopens one-third of closed area of Gulf to fishing.

- July 24

- BP says an internal investigation has cleared itself of gross negligence in the spill and will publish the findings in the next month.
- Ships return after Bonnie turns out not to have been as strong as anticipated.

- July 27

- Towing vessel Pere Ana C pushing the barge Captain Beauford collides with Louisiana-owned oil and natural gas rig C177 in the northern part of Barataria Bay south of Lafitte, Louisiana. 6,000 feet of boom are placed around rig while it is evaluated.
- BP board formally announces that Bob Dudley will replace Tony Hayward as BP CEO effective October 1.

- July 31 - Florida reopens coastal state waters off the coast of Escambia County to the harvest of saltwater fish.

=== August ===
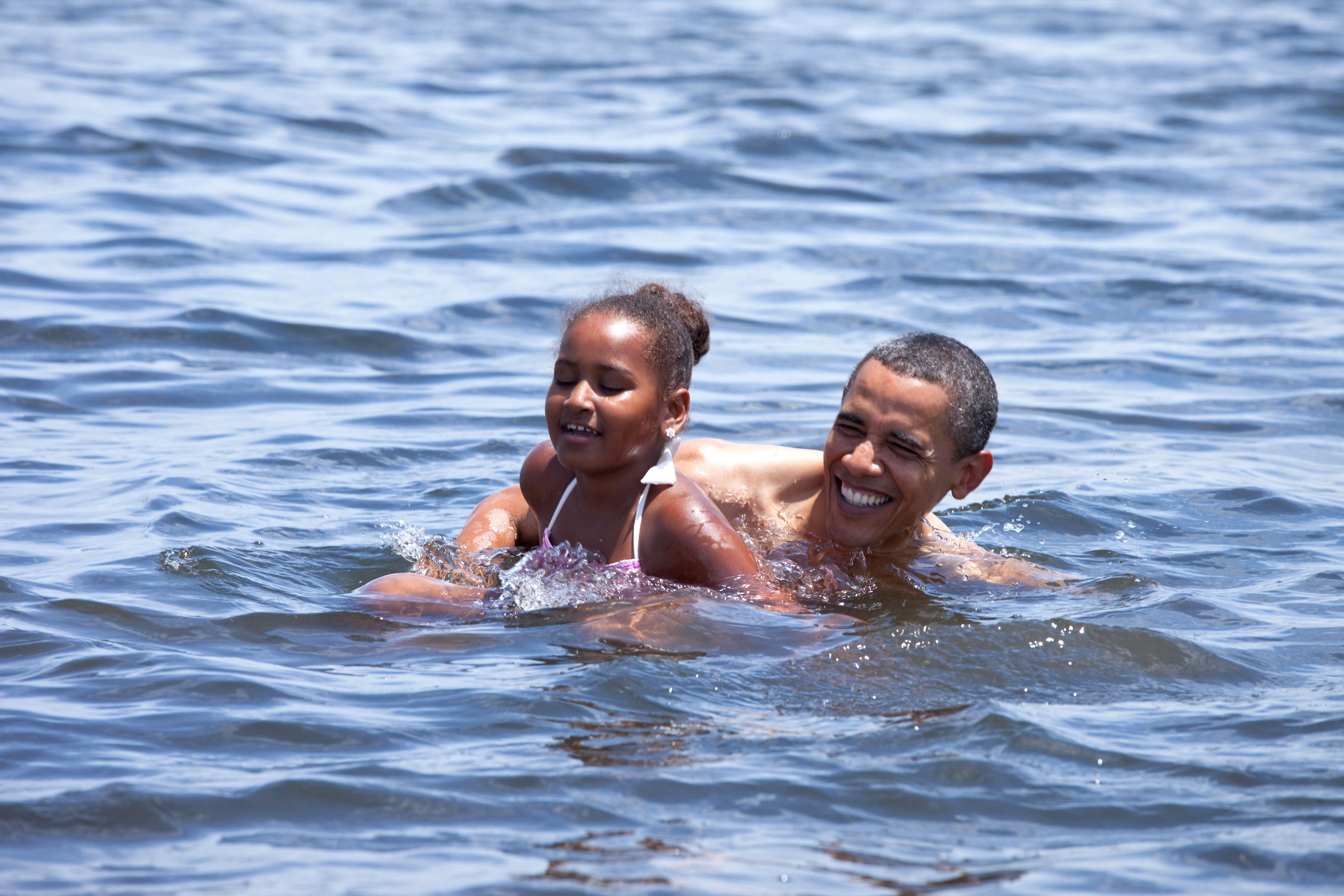
Barack Obama and daughter Sasha swim at St. Andrew’s Bay in Panama City Beach, Fla., Saturday, Aug. 14, 2010.

- August 2

- Flow Rate Technical Group reports that the well initially was dumping 62,000 barrels of oil per day initially after the spill and that it dwindled to 53,000 barrels when it was capped as the well was depleted. This means that 4.9 million barrels were dropped into the Gulf.
- Environmental Protection Agency releases a study of eight dispersants which concludes that Corexit 9500 "is generally no more or less toxic than mixtures with the other available alternatives" and that "dispersant-oil mixtures are generally no more toxic to the aquatic test species than oil alone."

- August 4 – BP reports that the well achieved "static condition" shortly after midnight after drilling mud is said to now fill the well.
- August 14 – President Obama, on a one-night vacation, stays at the Back Bay Marriott in Panama City, Florida. The White House releases a photo of the president and his daughter Sasha Obama swimming in St. Andrew's Bay (Florida). The press were not present during the swim.

=== September ===
- September 19 – BP officially declares oil well completely and permanently sealed.
- September 29 – Andy Inglis, who headed deepwater drilling operations in the Gulf of Mexico at the time of the spill, steps down as head of the upstream business.
- September 30 – Dudley tells the Houston Chronicle, "We don't believe we have been grossly negligent in anything we've seen in any of the investigations." Dudley also announces BP will create a stronger safety division.

=== October ===
- October 1 – Allen steps down.

=== November ===
- November 28 - Booz Allen Hamilton, Inc. announces the hiring of retired U.S. Coast Guard Admiral Thad Allen as a Senior Vice President of Thought Leadership on Law Enforcement, Homeland Security Strategy.

=== December ===
- December 15 – According to a feature Associated Press story on the homepage of Time Magazine, the U.S. federal government is suing BP Exploration and Production, Inc., and eight other corporations, for unlimited liability, in an effort to have them pay for the massive expenses involved in the cleanup and environmental recovery from the spill, including damages to natural resources; it also seeks civil penalties under the Clean Water Act.
- December 17 – Unified Area Command releases the report from the Operational Science Advisory Team (OSAT) regarding results of sampling and analyses of thousands of water column and sediment samples from the shoreline through deepwater areas. Reference OSAT report at Restorethegulf.gov
