= Efforts to stem the Deepwater Horizon oil spill =

Efforts to stem the Deepwater Horizon oil spill were ongoing from the time that the Deepwater Horizon exploded on April 20, 2010 until the well was sealed by a cap on July 15, 2010. Various species of dolphins and other mammals (61 casualties), birds (2,095 casualties), and the endangered sea turtles (467 casualties) were killed either directly or indirectly by the oil spill. The Deepwater Horizon spill surpassed in volume the 1989 Exxon Valdez oil spill as the largest ever to originate in U.S.-controlled waters; it is comparable to the 1979 Ixtoc I oil spill in total volume released (Ixtoc discharged 140 million US gallons (530,000 m^{3}) to 148 million US gallons (560,000 m^{3}); as of mid-July 2010, Deepwater Horizon had spilled 90 million US gallons (340,000 m^{3}) to 180 million US gallons (680,000 m^{3}).

Much of the oil is so far down in the Gulf that only nature, including microbes, will be able to remove it using a process called bioremediation. Terry Hazen of the Department of Energy's Lawrence Berkeley National Laboratory said the process could take months or years. But after six weeks of research, he said that microbes could work quickly in 84 °F (29 °C) water as opposed to colder-temperature waters. The A Whale, which is an oil tanker converted into a giant oil skimmer owned by the Taiwan Marine Transport Co (TMT), could do little because of BP's use of chemical dispersants, the company said. Robert Bea of The University of California, who worked on the Ixtoc spill and the 1969 Santa Barbara oil spill, said the old methods would be the best ones. Dispersants, he said, did not work except in keeping beaches clean, and they hurt the environment.

== Closure attempts ==
=== Short term efforts ===
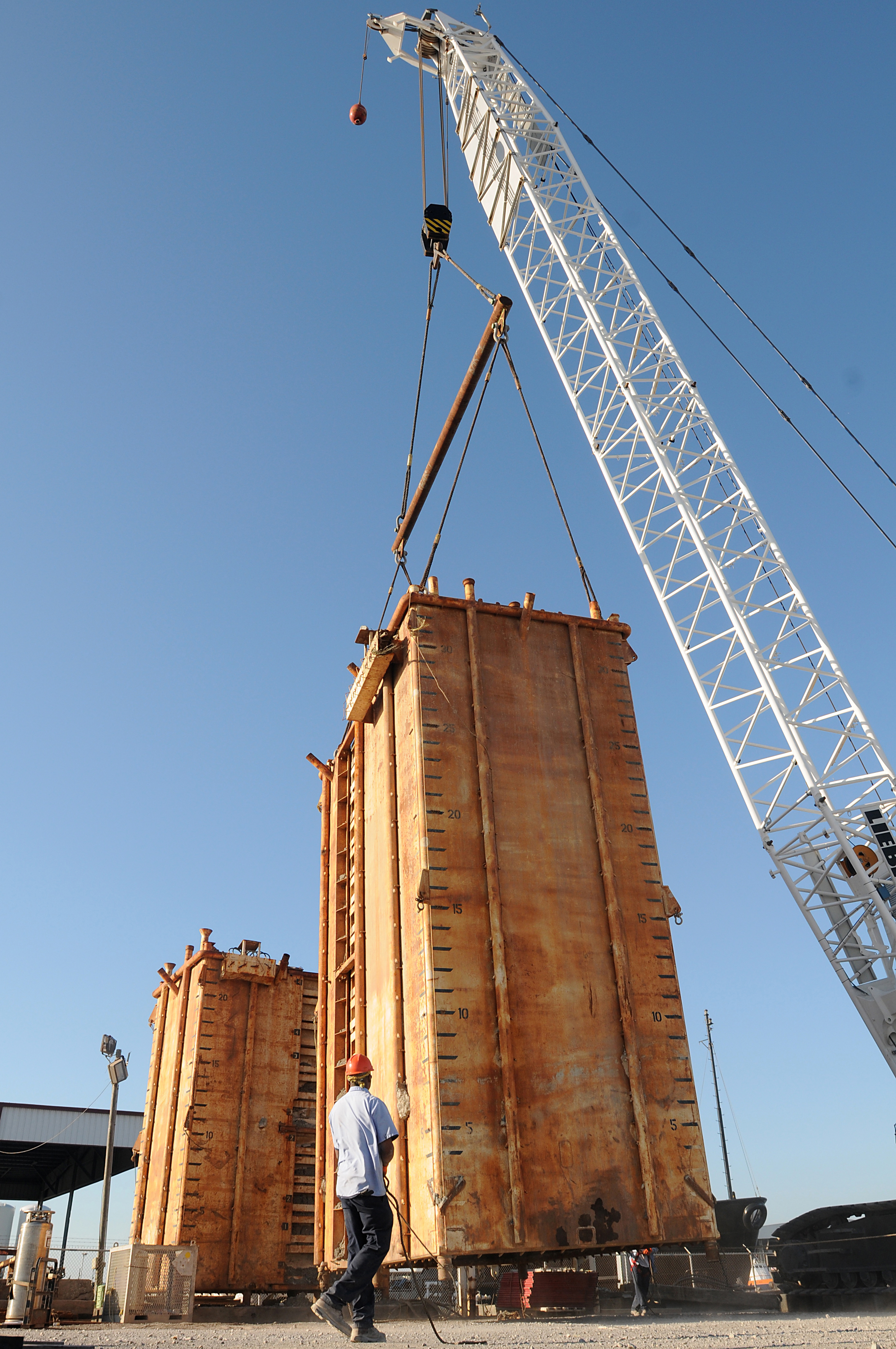
Oil containment dome under construction in Port Fourchon, Louisiana, at Wild Well Control on 26 April

The first attempts to stop the oil spill were to use remotely operated underwater vehicles to close the blowout preventer valves on the well head; however, all these attempts failed. The second technique, placing a 125-tonne (276,000 lb) containment dome (which had worked on leaks in shallower water) over the largest leak and piping the oil to a storage vessel on the surface, failed when gas leaking from the pipe combined with cold water formed methane hydrate crystals that blocked the opening at the top of the dome.

On May 14, engineers began the process of positioning a 6-inch (15 cm) wide riser insertion tube into the 21-inch (53 cm) wide burst pipe. There was a stopper-like washer around the tube that plugs the end of the riser and diverts the flow into the insertion tube. The collected gas was flared and oil stored on the board of drillship Discoverer Enterprise. 924,000 US gallons (22,000 barrels) of oil was collected before removal of the tube.

On May 26, BP tried to close the well using a technique called "top kill", which also failed. This process involved pumping heavy drilling fluids through two 3-inch (7.6 cm) lines into the blowout preventer to restrict the flow of oil before sealing it permanently with cement.

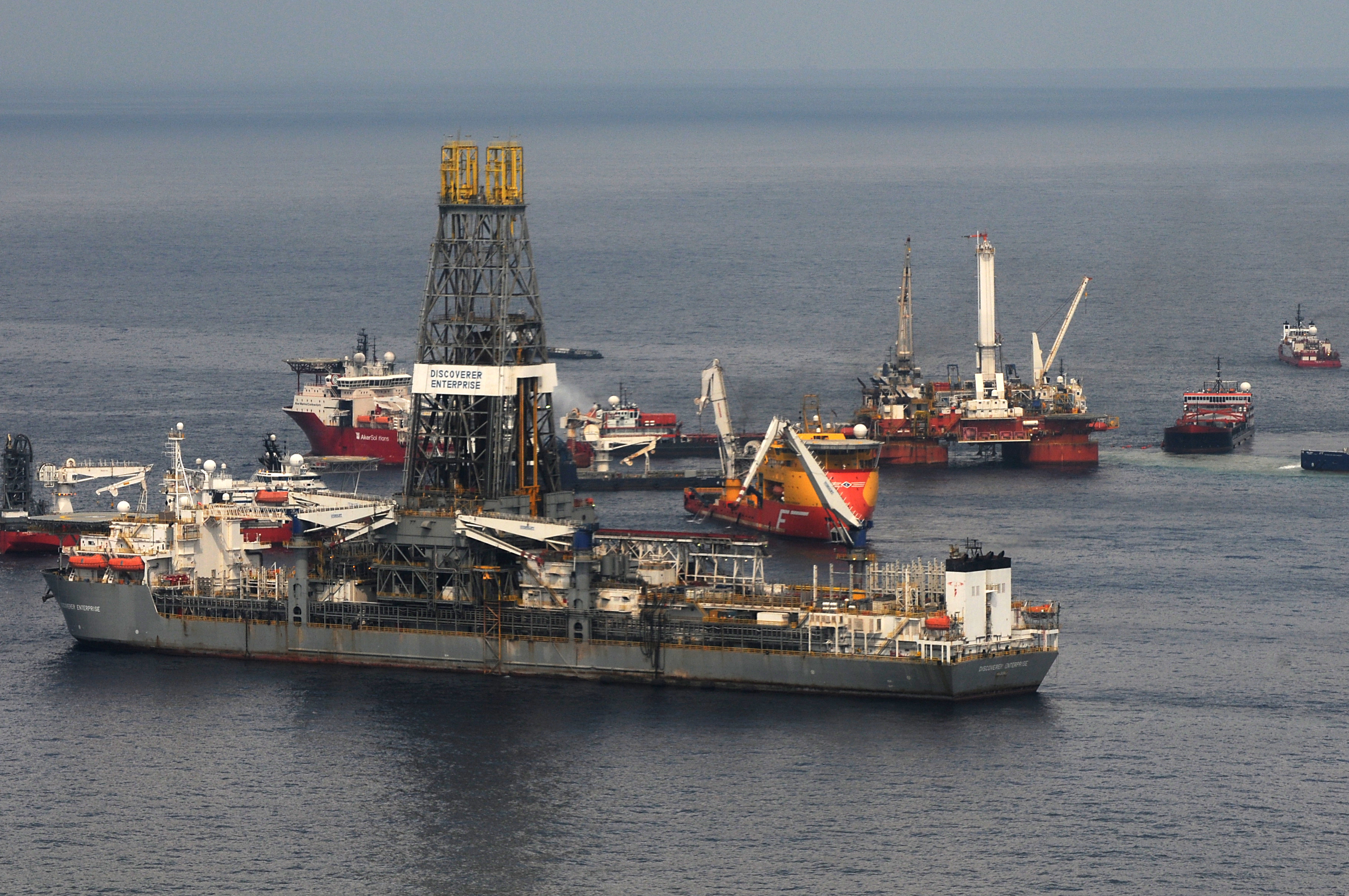
The Q4000 and the Discoverer Enterprise during the failed top kill procedure

On May 29, BP moved to the Lower Marine Riser Package (LMRP) Cap Containment System by removing the damaged riser from the top of the blowout preventer and covering the pipe by the cap which connects it to a riser. The cap was attached on June 3, and the system began to capture the leaking oil. On June 6, the CEO of BP Tony Hayward, stated that the amount captured was "probably the vast majority of the oil." However, Ira Leifer, a member of the Flow Rate Technical Group (FRTG), claimed that more oil was escaping than before the riser was cut and the cap containment system was placed.

On June 16, a second containment system connected directly to the blowout preventer became operational carrying oil and gas through a subsea manifold to the Q4000 service vessel with a processing capacity for about 5,000 barrels (210,000 US gallons; 790 cubic metres) of oil per day. Oil and gas are both burned on Q4000 in a clean-burning system.

As Discoverer Enterprise's processing capacity was insufficient, drillship Discoverer Clear Leader and the floating production, storage and offloading (FPSO) vessel Helix Producer 1 were added, offloading oil with tankers Evi Knutsen, and Juanita. Each tanker has a total capacity of 750,000 barrels (32,000,000 US gallons; 119,000 cubic metres). In addition, FPSO Seillean, and well testing vessel Toisa Pisces would process oil. They are offloaded by shuttle tanker Loch Rannoch.

On July 5, BP announced that its one-day oil recovery effort accounted for 24,980 barrels (3,972 m^{3}) of oil, and the flaring off of 57.1 million cubic feet (1,620,000 m^{3}) of natural gas. The total oil collection to date for the spill was estimated at 657,300 barrels (104,500 m^{3}). The government's estimates suggested the cap and other equipment were capturing less than half of the oil leaking from the sea floor as of late June.

On July 10, robots removed the containment cap to replace it with an improved cap ("Top Hat Number 10"); this meant all of the leaking oil would escape until the new cap was in place. A broken pipe was taken out on July 11 and replaced with a flange spool resembling a pipe, on top of which the new cap was located. The well integrity test was scheduled to take place after the installation of a three-ram capping stack over the lower marine riser package of the Deepwater Horizon semi-submersible rig on July 13. On July 14, BP announced that the test would be delayed under Allen's orders; oil continued to flow into the Gulf.

=== Temporary closure ===
On July 15, 2010, BP announced that it had successfully plugged the oil leak using a tightly fitted cap. The cap, weighing 75 tons and standing 30 feet (9.1 m) high, was bolted to the failed blowout preventer. It consisted of a Flange Transition Spool and a 3 Ram Stack and was a temporary solution.

President Barack Obama cautiously welcomed the news that the leak had been stopped, while stressing "it is important we don't get ahead of ourselves". If the cap held for the planned 48 hours, the plan was to temporarily reopen the valves in order to allow for seismic tests to ensure that oil was not escaping into the bedrock. At the time of the stoppage, oil had been leaking continuously into the Gulf of Mexico for 85 days since the Deepwater Horizon drilling rig exploded on April 20, 2010.

Until July 19, 2010, there was no evidence that the well had ruptured, meaning that the cap appeared to be working. According to Thad Allen, the retired US Coast Guard admiral in charge of the operation to stop the leak, the cap would be used to channel the flowing oil to surface ships for collection after the 48-hour test period and would be used to shut the well down during bad weather rather than permanently cap the well, which was expected to happen in mid-August 2010, when relief wells had been completed. On July 19, 2010, seepage was detected from the seafloor within two kilometres of the well. Allen believed that it probably has nothing to do with the well, as oil and gas are known to ooze naturally from fissures in the bottom of the Gulf of Mexico.

On July 22, forecasts of the track of tropical storm Bonnie made it imperative that the support ships and rigs leave the site. Allen, in consultation with Energy Secretary Steven Chu, made the decision to leave the valves closed despite the lack of supervision from the support ships. Kent Wells, a senior vice president of BP, said "We have enough confidence to leave the well shut in." Since the storm proved weaker than expected, on July 24 the ships returned, and efforts to close the well on a permanent basis soon began.

== Permanent closure ==
BP drilled two relief wells into the original well to enable them to block it. Once the relief wells reached the original borehole, the operator pumped drilling fluid into the original well. Transocean's Development Driller III started drilling a first relief well on May 2 and was at 13,978 feet (4,260 m) out of 18,000 feet (5,500 m) as of June 14. GSF Development Driller II started drilling a second relief on May 16 and was halted at 8,576 feet (2,614 m) out of 18,000 feet (5,500 m) as of June 14 while BP engineers verified the operational status of the second relief well's blowout preventer. The relief wells began operating in August 2010 at a cost of about $100 million per well.

Despite delays caused by Tropical Storm Bonnie, the first phase of stopping the leak was expected to start on July 30. Lining a relief shaft with steel casing was expected to resume on July 28, and a relief tunnel would take a week to drill but may be needed if phase one did not work.

Adm. Thad Allen said on July 26 that the "static kill", using mud and cement poured into the top of the well, could start on August 2. The "bottom kill" would follow, with mud and cement entering the well under the sea floor, possibly by August 7.

Starting at 15:00 CDT on August 3, first test oil and then drilling mud was pumped at a slow rate of approximately two barrels/minute into the well-head. Pumping continued for eight hours, at the end of which time the well was declared to be "in a static condition".

At 09:15 CDT on August 4, with Adm. Allen's approval, BP began pumping cement from the top, sealing that part of the flow channel permanently.

On August 4, Allen said the static kill was working. Two weeks later, though, Allen said it was uncertain when the well could be declared completely sealed. The bottom kill had yet to take place, and the relief well had been delayed by storms. Even when the relief well was ready, he said BP had to make sure pressure would not build up again.

On September 10, Allen said the bottom kill could start sooner than expected because a "locking sleeve" could be used on top of the well to prevent excessive pressure from causing problems. BP said the relief well was about 50 feet (15 m) from the intersection, and finishing the boring would take four more days. On September 16, the relief well reached its destination and pumping of cement to seal the well began. Officials said on September 18 that the cement pumped in from the base of the well had completed the sealing of the well. On September 19, after pressure testing, Allen declared that operations to permanently seal the well were completed and it was "effectively dead".

== Considerations of using explosives ==
In mid-May 2010, United States Secretary of Energy Steven Chu assembled a team of nuclear physicists, including hydrogen bomb designer Richard Garwin and Sandia National Laboratories director Tom Hunter. On May 24, BP ruled out conventional explosives, saying that if blasts failed to clog the well, "We would have denied ourselves all other options."

Federal officials also ruled out nuclear devices due to environmental and political risks, as doing so would be a violation of Comprehensive Nuclear-Test-Ban Treaty that the United States has signed. Admiral Thad Allen stated, "since we don't know the condition of that well bore or the casings, I would be cautious about putting any kind of kinetic energy on that well head, because what you may do is create open communication between the reservoir and the sea floor." Allen also said that the result could be oil seeping through cracks and through the seafloor, "and then be uncontrolled until the reservoir pressure equalized with the hydrostatic pressure; I think that's a risk that's too great to take a chance on, myself." Casing integrity concerns also influenced the pressure chosen for the top kill procedure.
