= Outline of environmentalism =

Overview of and topical guide to environmentalism

The following outline is provided as an overview of and topical guide to environmentalism:

Environmentalism – broad philosophy, ideology and social movement regarding concerns for environmental conservation and improvement of the health of the environment, particularly as the measure for this health seeks to incorporate the concerns of non-human elements. Environmentalism advocates the preservation, restoration and/or improvement of the natural environment, and may be referred to as a movement to control pollution.

== Definition ==
Environmentalism can be described as all of the following:

- a philosophy – the study of knowledge and the nature of life
  - an environmental philosophy – a branch of philosophy that studies the fundamental workings of human's relation to the environment and our place in it
  - a branch of ethics – environmentalism concerns moral relationships and the intrinsic value of both humans and the environment
    - a branch of environmental ethics – environmental ethics describes the moral aspects that connect humans and non humans concerning the environment and what obligations human species have to non human species
- Ideology – a system of ideas that focus on environmental thought and form how one thinks about maintaining the environment
- Political movement – environmentalists seek to both change and create policy concerning environmental issues in order to protect the environment from further harm
  - Social movement – as a collective group environmentalists seek to create social environmental change and protect environmental liberties through both radical and non radical ecological groups

== Environmental movement ==
- Conservation movement – seeks to protect natural areas for sustainable consumption, as well as traditional (hunting, fishing, trapping) and spiritual use.
  - Environmental conservation – process in which one is involved in conserving the natural aspects of the environment. Whether through reforestation, recycling, or pollution control, environmental conservation sustains the natural quality of life.
- Environmental health movement – dates at least to Progressive Era, and focuses on urban standards like clean water, efficient sewage handling, and stable population growth. Environmental health could also deal with nutrition, preventive medicine, aging, and other concerns specific to human well-being. Environmental health is also seen as an indicator for the state of the environment, or an early warning system for what may happen to humans
- Environmental justice – movement that began in the U.S. in the 1980s and seeks an end to environmental racism and prevent low-income and minority communities from an unbalanced exposure to highways, garbage dumps, and factories. The Environmental Justice movement seeks to link "social" and "ecological" environmental concerns, while at the same time preventing de facto racism, and classism. This makes it particularly adequate for the construction of labor-environmental alliances.
- Ecology movement – involves the Gaia theory as well as Value of Earth and other interactions between humans, science, and responsibility.
  - Deep ecology – ideological spinoff of the ecology movement that views the diversity and integrity of the planetary ecosystem, in and for itself, as its primary value.
- Bright green environmentalism – currently popular sub-movement that emphasizes the idea that through technology, good design and more thoughtful use of energy and resources, people can live responsible, sustainable lives while enjoying prosperity.
- Anti-nuclear movement – opposes the use of various nuclear technologies.
  - Positions
    - Nuclear disarmament
    - Opposes the use of nuclear power
  - Anti-nuclear groups
    - Campaign for Nuclear Disarmament
    - Friends of the Earth
    - Greenpeace
    - International Physicians for the Prevention of Nuclear War
    - Nuclear Information and Resource Service

== Environmental issues ==
These topics relate to the anthropogenic effects on the natural environment:

- Climate change
  - Global warming
  - Global dimming
  - Fossil fuels
  - Sea level rise
  - Greenhouse gas
  - Ocean acidification
  - Shutdown of thermohaline circulation
- Conservation
  - Species extinction
  - Pollinator decline
  - Coral bleaching
  - Holocene extinction
  - Invasive species
  - Poaching
  - Endangered species
- Energy
  - Energy conservation
  - Renewable energy
  - Efficient energy use
  - Renewable energy commercialization
- Environmental degradation
  - Eutrophication
  - Habitat destruction
  - Invasive species
  - Trail ethics
- Environmental health
  - Air quality
  - Asthma
  - Electromagnetic fields
  - Electromagnetic radiation and health
  - Indoor air quality
  - Lead poisoning
  - Sick Building Syndrome
- Genetic engineering
  - Genetic pollution
  - Genetically modified food controversies
- Intensive farming
  - Overgrazing
  - Irrigation
  - Monoculture
  - Environmental effects of meat production
  - Slash and burn
  - Pesticide drift
  - Plasticulture
- Land degradation
  - Land pollution
  - Desertification
- Soil
  - Soil conservation
  - Soil erosion
  - Soil contamination
  - Soil salination
- Land use
  - Urban sprawl
  - Habitat fragmentation
  - Habitat destruction
- Nanotechnology
  - Nanotoxicology
  - Nanopollution
- Nuclear issues
  - Nuclear fallout
  - Nuclear meltdown
  - Nuclear power
  - Nuclear weapons
  - Nuclear and radiation accidents
  - Nuclear safety
  - High-level radioactive waste management.
- Overpopulation
  - Burial
  - Water crisis
  - Overpopulation in companion animals
  - Tragedy of the commons
- Ozone depletion
  - Chlorofluorocarbons
- Pollution
  - Light pollution
  - Noise pollution
  - Visual pollution
  - Nonpoint source pollution
  - Point source pollution
- Water pollution
  - Acid rain
  - Eutrophication
  - Marine pollution
  - Ocean dumping
  - Oil spills
  - Thermal pollution
  - Urban runoff
  - Water crisis
  - Marine debris
  - Microplastics
  - Ocean acidification
  - Ship pollution
  - Wastewater
  - Fish kill
  - Algal bloom
  - Mercury in fish
- Air pollution
  - Smog
  - Tropospheric ozone
  - Indoor air quality
  - Volatile organic compound
  - Airborne particulate matter
- Reservoirs
  - Environmental impacts of reservoirs
- Resource depletion
  - Exploitation of natural resources
  - Overdrafting
- Consumerism
  - Consumer capitalism
  - Planned obsolescence
  - Over-consumption
- Fishing
  - Blast fishing
  - Bottom trawling
  - Cyanide fishing
  - Ghost nets
  - Illegal, unreported and unregulated fishing
  - Overfishing
  - Shark finning
  - Whaling
- Logging
  - Clearcutting
  - Deforestation
  - Illegal logging
- Mining
  - Acid mine drainage
  - Hydraulic fracturing
  - Mountaintop removal mining
  - Slurry impoundments
- Toxins
  - Chlorofluorocarbons
  - DDT
  - Endocrine disruptors
  - Dioxin
  - Toxic heavy metals
  - Herbicides
  - Pesticides
  - Toxic waste
  - PCB
  - Bioaccumulation
  - Biomagnification
- Waste
  - Electronic waste
  - Litter
  - Waste disposal incidents
  - Marine debris
  - Medical waste
  - Landfill
  - Leachate
  - Incineration
  - Great Pacific Garbage Patch

== History of environmentalism ==
- History of the anti-nuclear movement (from before 1945)
- History of organic farming (from ancient times)
- History of passive solar building design
- History of sustainability (from the earliest civilizations)
- History of waste management (from ancient times)

=== History of pollution sources ===
- History of coal mining (from ancient times)
- History of the diesel car (from 1933)
- History of electric power transmission (from the late 19th century)
- History of the jet engine
- History of manufactured gas (from the 18th century)
- History of the oil shale industry (from the mid-19th century)
- History of the oil tanker (since 1863?)
- History of rail transport (from nearly 500 years ago)
- History of rapid transit (from 1863)
- History of road transport (from ancient times)
- History of the steam engine (from the first century CE)
- History of steam road vehicles (experimentally from the 17th century)
- History of water fluoridation (from c. 1901, with research on cause Colorado brown stain)

=== Timelines ===
Timeline of history of environmentalism

- Timeline of alcohol fuel
- Timeline of environmental events
- Timeline of environmental history
- Timeline of the New Zealand environment
- Timeline of genetically modified organisms
- Timeline of major U.S. environmental and occupational health regulation
- Timeline of Minamata disease
- Timeline of nuclear weapons development
- Timeline of relief efforts after the 2010 Chile earthquake
- Timeline of relief efforts after the 2010 Haiti earthquake
- Timeline of the Deepwater Horizon oil spill
- Timeline of the Deepwater Horizon oil spill (May 2010)
- Timeline of the Deepwater Horizon oil spill (June 2010)
- Timeline of the Deepwater Horizon oil spill (July 2010)
- Timeline of the Deepwater Horizon oil spill (August 2010)
- Timeline of the Fukushima Daiichi nuclear disaster
- Timeline of the Fukushima Daini nuclear accidents

== Environmentalism organizations ==
- Environmental organization
  - List of conservation organisations
  - List of environmental organizations

== Environmentalism publications ==
- Lists of environmental publications
- List of environmental periodicals
- List of environmental websites
- List of environmental books
- List of environmental reports

== See also ==
- Environmentalism
- Outline of green politics
- Lists of environmental topics
  - Index of conservation articles
  - Index of sustainability articles
  - List of environmental issues
  - List of environmental disasters
