= HFRS =

HFRS may refer to:

- Hampshire Fire and Rescue Service
- Hantavirus hemorrhagic fever with renal syndrome
- Helicopter Flight Rescue System
- Helix fast-response system
- Hertfordshire Fire and Rescue Service
- Humberside Fire and Rescue Service

== See also ==
- HFR (disambiguation)
