= Helix fast-response system =

The Helix fast-response system (HFRS) is a deep-sea oil spill response plan licensed by HWCG LLC, a consortium of 16 independent oil companies, to respond to subsea well incidents. Helix Energy Solutions Group designed the Helix fast-response system based on techniques used to contain the 2010 Gulf of Mexico oil spill. On February 28, 2011 the drilling moratorium imposed as a result of the spill ended when the United States Department of the Interior approved the first drilling permit based on the availability of the HFRS to offshore oil companies.

The HFRS relies on the deployment of Helix ESG's Q4000 multipurpose semisubmersible platform and the Helix Producer 1 floating production unit. Both vessels are based in the Gulf of Mexico and played significant roles in the 2010 Deepwater Horizon spill response. At full production capacity, the HFRS can handle up to 55,000 barrels of oil per day (70,000 barrels of liquid or 95 million standard cubic feet per day) at 10,000 psi in water depths to 10,000 feet.

== Overview ==
When deployed, the HFRS is assembled in stages following an ROV inspection of the damaged subsea well head. ROVs then lower a custom-designed well cap onto the blowout preventer (BOP) stack; if the flow of escaping hydrocarbons is not too extreme, the vents inside the well cap can be manually closed one by one to shut in the well. If the pressure is too extreme to shut in the well, ROVs will lower an intervention riser system (IRS) onto the top of the well cap. The hydrocarbons will then be transferred through a marine riser to the Q4000, which will use its gas flare to burn off much of the oil and gas while transferring the rest through a flexible riser to the Helix Producer 1.

The Helix Producer 1 will activate its flare to burn off the gas while it processes the oil and transfers it to a nearby oil tanker through another flexible riser. As the oil and gas is successfully captured, processed or burned and then transferred onto a tanker, drillships will be required to drill a relief well to permanently kill the damaged subsea well.

== Developments ==
In January 2011 Helix ESG signed an agreement with Clean Gulf Associates, a non-profit industry group, to make the HFRS available for a two-year period to CGA member companies in the event of a future subsea well incident in the Gulf of Mexico. In 2012 Helix ESG said it was working develop an additional consortium for the Caribbean and would likely base the system out of Port of Spain Trinidad.
