= HWCG LLC =

HWCG LLC is a non-profit consortium of deep water oil and gas companies. HWCG maintains a comprehensive deepwater well containment response model that can be activated immediately in the event of a US Gulf of Mexico subsea blowout. It comprises oil and gas companies operating in the Gulf and incorporates the consortium’s generic well containment plan. HWCG has a healthy mutual aid component whereby HWCG members will respond and support another member’s incident.

== History ==
After the Deepwater Horizon oil spill, President Obama announced a drilling moratorium on new permits for offshore wells and exploration in the Gulf of Mexico came to a standstill. In response to the suspension, twenty-four deepwater operators came together to establish well containment resources and plans according to the guidelines set forth in BOEMRE’s (BSEE’s) Notice To Lessees No. 2010-N10. These offshore oil and gas companies formed HWCG LLC with the common goal of establishing and maintaining the capability to quickly and comprehensively respond to a subsea blowout.

== Response System Capabilities ==
The consortium’s response system builds on the equipment proven effective in the containment of the Deepwater Horizon blowout, including the Helix Fast Response System with the Q4000 intervention vessel and Helix Producer 1 from Helix Energy Solutions Group.

HWCG’s core equipment includes two dual-ram capping stacks capable of operating in water depths through 10,000 feet. These capping stacks can effectively shut-in and contain a subsea well. If a flow and capture is required, the system is capable of a process volume of 130,000 barrels of oily fluids per day and 220 million cubic feet of gas per day.

HWCG maintains contracts and operating agreements with over thirty service providers to leverage additional expertise, assistance and equipment. This integrated response solution yielded a tested deployment response time of less than seven days to cap a deepwater well, compared to the nearly 90 days needed to contain the Deepwater Horizon blowout.

HWCG continues to run annual subsea incident response drills and collaborates with members, service sector companies and regulators in order to continually test and improve its response plan.
