= Bennett Offshore =

American naval architecture firm

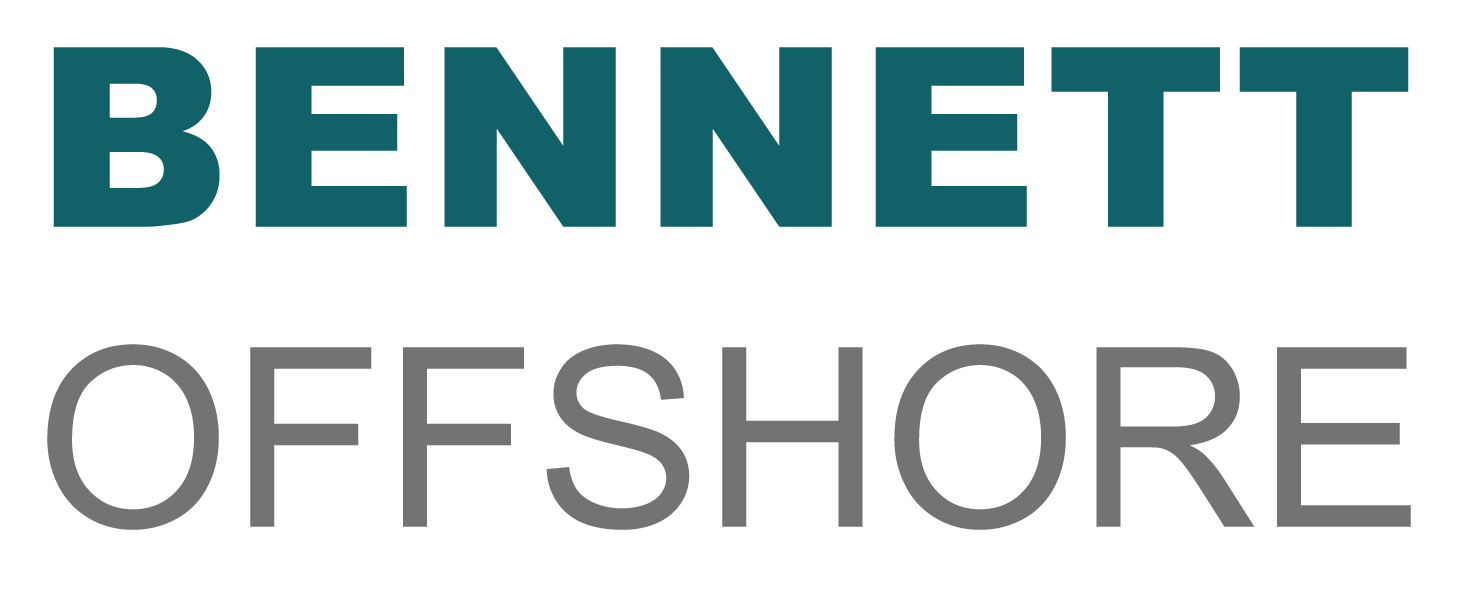
- Company type: Limited liability company
- Founded: 1997
- Founder: William T. Bennett, Jr.
- Headquarters: Houston, Texas; New Orleans, Louisiana, U.S.
- Key people: Marc Wong, President
- Services: Naval architecture, structural engineering, hydrodynamics, liftboat design, vessel design, and design and modification of other offshore mobile drilling and production platforms.
- Website: www.bennettoffshore.com

Bennett Offshore, L.L.C., is an independent naval architecture, design and consulting firm founded in 1997 by William T. Bennett, Jr., to deliver engineering services to the offshore industry. Bennett headquarters are located in Houston, Texas, and the company has an engineering office in New Orleans, Louisiana. Bennett Offshore provides traditional naval architecture, structural, mechanical and electrical engineering as well as hydrodynamics and other marine- and offshore-related services. In addition, the firm is involved in design, modification, and construction supervision of marine vessels, liftboats and other offshore mobile drilling and production units. Bennett Offshore worked in collaboration with the Offshore Technology Development group of Keppel Offshore & Marine to design the ORCA series of self-propelled, self-elevating platforms.

== History ==
=== Founding ===
In the spring of 1997, William T. Bennett, Jr., retired from his previous position as CEO of Friede & Goldman and established his own naval architecture and consulting firm, Bennett & Associates, L.L.C. He worked at first out of his own home, employing a single structural engineer. By the fall of 1997, Mr. Bennett had acquired a nearly 100-year-old building on historic St. Charles Avenue in New Orleans, Louisiana. Over the next few years, the company grew while providing engineering services to the offshore industry.

=== Bennett co-designs Keppel "B-Class" jack-up ===
In 1998, Mr. Bennett and his team were invited by Keppel FELS in Singapore to co-design what was to become the popular "B-Class" jack-up; a rig ordered in 2014 by UMW Drilling became the 75th B-Class jack-up ordered from Keppel since 2000. Bennett engineers also contributed to the design of Keppel's A-Class and N-Class jack-ups.

=== Bennett designs Q-4000 semisubmersible ===
In 1999, Cal Dive International approached Bennett & Associates to complete the basic design (and later the detailed design) of a semisubmersible. In 2000, Richard Michel from Bennett & Associates and William Strong of Cal Dive jointly presented a paper at the Offshore Technology Conference showcasing the capabilities of the "Quantum 4000" (or Q4000). The semisubmersible was delivered in 2002. In 2010, the Q4000 was one of the auxiliary drilling platforms supporting the well containment efforts during the Deepwater Horizon incident. It retrieved the failed BOP from the well for further investigation.

=== Publication : "Jack Up Units - A Technical Primer" ===
In 2005, Bennett & Associates and Keppel FELS co-authored a document titled "JACK UP UNITS - A Technical Primer For The Offshore Industry Professional." The intention was to provide industry personnel with an introduction to jack-up platforms and their design considerations. This document has since become known in the industry as simply "the jack-up primer."

=== Hurricane Katrina ===
In August 2005, Hurricane Katrina made landfall on the Louisiana and Mississippi coasts. The ensuing levee failures in New Orleans left the city without power and other basic services for months. As a result, Bennett & Associates temporarily relocated its employees to Houston. When utilities were restored to their New Orleans building, Bennett & Associates reopened the original St. Charles Ave. office and retained the Houston office as company headquarters.

=== Bennett designs MinDOC (ATP "Titan") ===
In 2006, while looking to acquire an offshore drilling platform, ATP Oil and Gas approached Bennett & Associates and expressed interest in MinDOC, a design for a multi-column deepwater spar alternative conceived years earlier by Mr. Alden "Doc" Laborde and Mr. Bennett. Bennett & Associates was awarded a contract and designed the ATP "Titan," which became the first US-built deepwater dry tree drilling and production platform.

=== Keppel acquires Bennett & Associates ===
In January 2012, Bennett & Associates was acquired by Keppel Offshore & Marine to enhance Keppel's design and engineering capabilities. Bennett & Associates continued to provide engineering services to the offshore industry, as it traditionally had done, while offering additional services made possible by its association with a global organization possessing extensive offshore construction experience. In collaboration with Keppel, Bennett began work on the design of a series of self-propelled, self-elevating platforms.

=== Bennett & Associates becomes Bennett Offshore ===
Following the 2012 acquisition of Bennett & Associates by Keppel Offshore & Marine, Bennett & Associates changed its name to Bennett Offshore to reflect its expanded role in the offshore industry brought about by affiliation with Keppel.

=== ORCA series of self-propelled, self-elevating platforms ===
Working in collaboration with the Offshore Technology Development group of Keppel Offshore & Marine, Bennett Offshore designed a range of self-propelled, self-elevating platforms named the ORCA series. Utilization of ORCA platforms includes construction support, light drilling, well intervention, well plug and abandonment, coiled tubing operations, wind farm installation, gas compression and accommodation. The first ORCA 2500, customized for the Middle East and North Africa, was delivered to a Qatari rig operator in February 2016. An ORCA 3500 is currently under construction by Keppel FELS for delivery in Q4 2017.
