= Timeline of the Deepwater Horizon oil spill (August 2010) =

Following is a timeline of the Deepwater Horizon oil spill for August 2010 .

== August 1–7 ==
- August 1

- Some BP gas stations say they want to revert to the Amoco brand.
- BP exec Doug Suttles says he would eat seafood from the Gulf saying, "There's been a tremendous amount of testing done by NOAA (the National Oceanic and Atmospheric Administration) and the state agencies and the FDA and others. They're not going to open these waters to either sport fishing or commercial fishing if it's not safe to eat the fish...I have a lot of confidence in those agencies and I trust their recommendations and I would eat their food -- the seafood out of the Gulf, and I would feed it to my family."

- August 2

- Flow Rate Technical Group reports that the well initially was dumping 62,000 barrels of oil per day initially after the spill and that it dwindled to 53,000 barrels when it was capped as the well was depleted. This means that 4.9 million barrels were dropped into the Gulf.
- A hydraulic leak delays the start of the static kill process.
- Environmental Protection Agency releases a study of eight dispersants which concludes that Corexit 9500 "is generally no more or less toxic than mixtures with the other available alternatives" and that "dispersant-oil mixtures are generally no more toxic to the aquatic test species than oil alone".
- X Prize Foundation offer $1 million prize for idea that "demonstrates the ability to recover oil on the sea surface at the highest oil recovery rate (ORR) and the highest recovery efficiency"
- Pamela Anderson, honorary chairman of People for the Ethical Treatment of Animals, is in New Orleans to draw attention to the transfer of 50 dogs in shelters to Virginia Beach Society for the Prevention of Cruelty to Animals. There'd been an increase in animals encaged in shelters because people who lost their jobs could not afford the upkeep of their pets, according to Anderson. She personally adopted two small dogs and named them Gina Lollobrigida and Brigitte Bardot.

- August 3

- Tropical Storm Colin forms in the Atlantic and is expected to travel up along the United States East Coast and not through the Gulf.
- BP begins pump drilling mud 13.2 pounds per gallon via the top cap at approximately 4 p.m.
- BP bills Anadarko Petroleum $1.2 billion for its share of spill costs.
- Last recorded observation of oil on the sea surface from aerial surveillance <UAC OSAT report https://web.archive.org/web/20110303025448/http://www.restorethegulf.gov/release/2010/12/16/data-analysis-and-findings>

- August 4

- BP reports that the well achieved "static condition" shortly after midnight after 2,300 barrels of drilling mud is said to fill the well.
- Harry Reid delays a vote on Senate bill which would lift the $75 million cap for economic damages from a spill under after the summer recess.
- NOAA Administrator Jane Lubchenco release the Oil Budget Calculator which says, "it is estimated that burning, skimming and direct recovery from the wellhead removed one quarter (25%) of the oil released from the wellhead. One quarter (25%) of the total oil naturally evaporated or dissolved, and just less than one quarter (24%) was dispersed (either naturally or as a result of operations) as microscopic droplets into Gulf waters. The residual amount — just over one quarter (26%) — is either on or just below the surface as light sheen and weathered tar balls, has washed ashore or been collected from the shore, or is buried in sand and sediments. Oil in the residual and dispersed categories is in the process of being degraded."

- August 5

- BP begins pumping cement into the well from the top. Greg McCormack, program director of the Petroleum Extension Service at the University of Texas, Austin explains "When the well is static, it's killed...But if you remove the pressure, it can become unkilled. Once you put cement in it from the bottom, then it can never be unkilled." Plans are continuing to place cement in the bottom starting around August 15.
- Workers file $10 billion suit against BP over a Spring 2010 incident in which 500,000 pounds of pollutants, including benzene were released at the Texas City, Texas refinery that was the site of the 2005 Texas City refinery explosion.
- BP completes cementing of the well from the top at 2:15 p.m. CDT.

- August 6

- Mike Utsler replaces Doug Suttles as BP's lead representative in the Unified Area Command and as chief operating officer for the BP Gulf Coast Restoration Organization, Suttles will return to his job as BP COO.
- Suttles says BP may drill the well again.

== August 8–14 ==
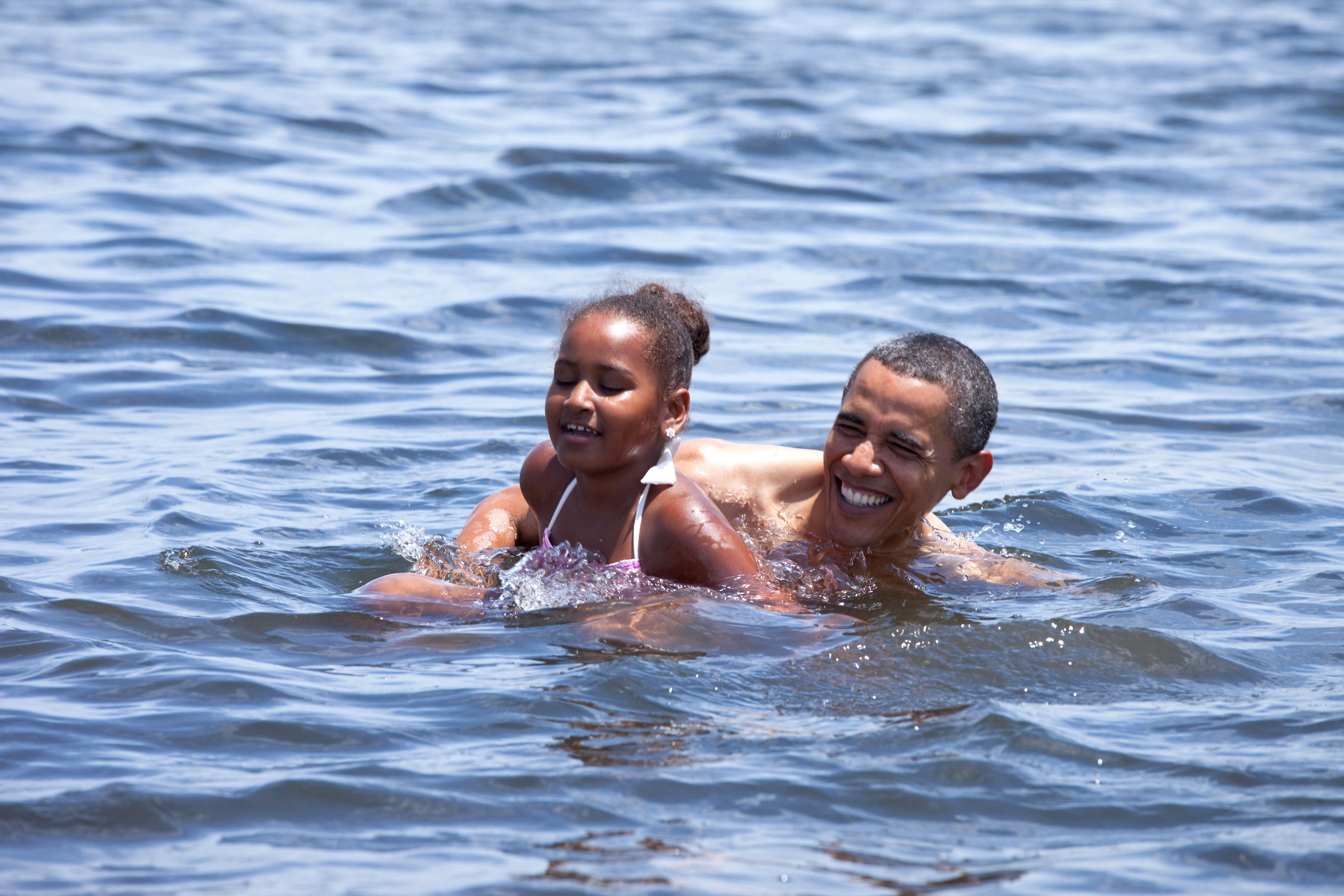
Barack Obama and daughter Sasha swim at Alligator Point in Panama City Beach, Fla., Saturday, Aug. 14, 2010.

- August 8

- James Cameron tells MTV about his proposals early in the spill for providing cameras for covering the spill, and that ultimately his proposals were adopted. He notes, "If you're relying on BP for imagery, you're basically relying on the criminal's video of the crime scene."

- August 9

- Rahm Emanuel, Assistant to the President for Energy and Climate Change Carol Browner, White House Counsel Robert Bauer, and Allen meet with BP executives Bob Dudley and Lamar McKay at the White House to discuss long term issues.
- Obama meets with members of the Super Bowl winning New Orleans Saints at the White House incorporating comments about the spill into his speech saying, "Yesterday, we learned that a procedure to prevent any more oil from spilling with a cement plug appears to have succeeded. And the final steps will be taken later in August when the relief well is completed. But what is clear is that the battle to stop the oil from flowing into the Gulf is just about over."
- BP pays its first $3 billion into the spill trust fund. It will pay $1.25 billion each quarter until it reaches $20 billion.

- August 10

- Thad Allen says the drilling of the relief well has been suspended because of an approaching tropical storm.
- NOAA reopens 5,144 square miles (13,320 km^{2}) of Gulf waters to commercial and recreational finfish fishing (along west Florida coast). Another 52,395 square miles (135,700 km^{2}) remain closed – down 22 percent from its height.
- U.S. Judicial Panel on Multidistrict Litigation transfers 77 suits in seven courts to U.S. District Court for the Eastern District of Louisiana under Judge Carl Barbier. The court is expected to consolidate at least 300 suits.

- August 11

- BP says it is considering it may back up its pledge of $20 billion from revenue from its oil wells which may include those in the Gulf.
- BP has downsizes its Florida command center at 1001 Brickell Bay Drive in Miami from 120 to 45.
- Spike Lee reported to be preparing a follow-up his document about Hurricane Katrina When the Levees Broke: A Requiem in Four Acts with If God Is Willing and Da Creek Don't Rise which will revisit Katrina and focus on the spill.
- Reports indicate that WJLA-TV suspended reporter Doug McKelway after telling a demonstration on July 20 that Obama received $77,051 from the BP employees.
- The Los Angeles Times reports of tensions in Grand Isle, Louisiana after BP brought in 1,500 contract workers, many of whom were African American and Latino. Locals complained of high crime and raised Confederate flags.

- August 12

- Work on the relief well begins as the storm passes.

- August 13

- Haley Barbour says shooting is to begin on a special on the CW Network hosted by David Hasselhoff promoting Mississippi as a tourist destination. Mississippi has received $15 million from BP to promote its tourism.

- August 14

- Obama on a one a night vacation stays at the Back Bay Marriott in Panama City Beach, Florida. The White House releases a photo of Obama and Sasha Obama swimming in St. Andrew's Bay (Florida) near Alligator Point. The Press was not present during the swim.
- Allen authorizes the bottom kill to begin. The relief well is 3-1/2 horizontally 50 feet (15 m) from the intercept point. The intercept has been delayed by a review to "exclude any low probability, high consequence events"

== August 15–22 ==
- August 16

- Shrimping season begins in the Gulf
- BP says it will contribute $52 million to help address the immense behavioral health issues arising from the spill.

- August 18

- The bottom kill process is delayed during an evaluation to see if pumping mud into the well's annulus would break the cement seal on the top.
- University of South Florida researchers report finding oil on the ocean floor in the DeSoto canyon challenging the reports that 75% of the oil has been captured, burned off, evaporated or broken down
- 23 Kemp's ridley sea turtles are released back into the Gulf of Mexico near Cedar Key, Florida.
- 17 December Unified Area Command releases report from the Operational Science Advisory Team regarding water column and sediment sampling and analyses from the shoreline through deepwater <reference OSAT report https://web.archive.org/web/20110303025448/http://www.restorethegulf.gov/release/2010/12/16/data-analysis-and-findings>
