= Michael Bromwich =

American lawyer

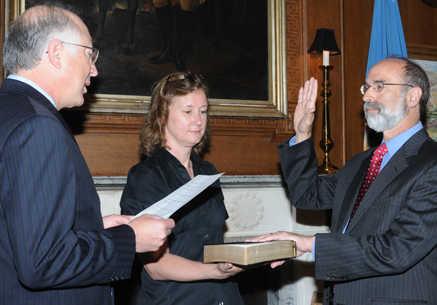
- Bromwich (right) sworn in by Secretary of the Interior Ken Salazar as Director of the Bureau of Ocean Energy Management (2010)

Director of the Bureau of Ocean Energy Management, Regulation and Enforcement
- In office June 15, 2010 – October 1, 2011
- Preceded by: S. Elizabeth Birnbaum
- Succeeded by: Position abolished

Inspector General of the Department of Justice
- In office June 9, 1994 – August 16, 1999
- Preceded by: Richard Hankinson
- Succeeded by: Robert Ashbaugh (Acting)

Personal details
- Born: December 19, 1953 (age 72) Los Angeles, California, U.S.
- Education: Harvard University (BA, MPA, JD)

Michael R. Bromwich (born December 19, 1953) is an American litigation attorney who was the inspector general of the U.S. Justice Department from 1994 to 1999. He was appointed as director of the Bureau of Ocean Energy Management, Regulation and Enforcement on June 15, 2010, in the wake of the Deepwater Horizon oil spill. (The agency was known as the Minerals Management Service prior to that date.) He served in that capacity until the dissolution of the agency on October 1, 2011.

== Early life ==
Bromwich was raised in a Jewish family and graduated summa cum laude from Harvard College in 1976. He subsequently received a master's degree in public policy from the John F. Kennedy School of Government, as well as a J.D. degree from Harvard Law School in 1980.

== Career ==
Bromwich was a federal prosecutor in the U.S. Attorney's Office for the Southern District of New York and served as associate counsel in the Office of Independent Counsel for Iran-Contra. Bromwich was one of three lawyers for the government in the prosecution of Lieutenant-Colonel Oliver L. North.

He was the Inspector General for the Department of Justice from 1994 to 1999. He headed an investigation into the FBI laboratory; the investigation into the bombing of Pan Am Flight 103; the FBI's conduct regarding Aldrich Ames; the handling of classified information by the FBI and the Department of Justice in the campaign finance investigation; the alleged deception of a congressional delegation by high-ranking officials of the Immigration and Naturalization Service; and the Justice Department's role in the CIA crack cocaine controversy.

In 1999, he joined the international law firm Fried, Frank, Harris, Shriver & Jacobson, where he headed the firm's internal investigations, compliance and monitoring practice group. In 2002, he served as an independent monitor for the Metropolitan Police Department of the District of Columbia.

In 2005, he was appointed to act as independent investigator for the Houston Police Department, to conduct an investigation and audit of its crime laboratory and property room. Bromwich and his team's investigations reported their conclusions in a final report published in 2007. They found pervasive fraud in the Houston crime lab, including fabrications of forensic analysis, false statements, and other forms of misconduct, and recommended major changes to crime lab procedure. Houston closed its crime lab and reestablished a new crime lab, independent of law enforcement, in 2014, with new procedures and standards.

In 2018, he began leading the legal team of former FBI Deputy Director Andrew McCabe. On September 22, Bromwich announced he would also be joining the legal team of Christine Blasey Ford, the college professor who earlier that month publicly alleged that U.S. Supreme Court nominee Brett Kavanaugh sexually assaulted her in 1982, when they were both teenagers, in what she described as an attempted rape. Bromwich said he was resigning from his law firm, Robbins Russell, because of objections within the firm to his being employed there while representing Ford.

== Criticisms ==
In 2013, Bromwich was appointed by Judge Denise Cote of the United States District Court for the Southern District of New York to serve as antitrust compliance monitor in United States v. Apple Inc. In the opening months of his tenure, Apple contended that he was "conducting a roving investigation" that was "interfering with Apple’s business operations", and Bromwich countered that Apple was preventing him from speaking to most of the Apple executives he wished to interview. In early 2015, in the midst of Apple's legal challenge to the imposition of a special monitor, the editorial page of Wall Street Journal criticized Bromwich for charging exorbitant fees for his services, and agreed with Apple that he was wandering outside of the bounds of his mandate from the Court, while also suggesting that his selection for the assignment in the first place had more to do with his long-standing political connections to Judge Cote than with any relevant experience.
