= Sealion Shipping =

Sealion Shipping Limited
- Industry: shipping
- Founded: 1975
- Headquarters: Farnham, United Kingdom
- Website: www.sealionshipping.co.uk

Sealion Shipping Limited was a British shipping and consultancy company specialized on the support of the offshore oil and gas industry. The company was established in January 1975. In 1982, Sealion expanded its activities into the support of the offshore oil and gas industry. It operates the Toisa fleet of 25 various types of offshore vessels, including well test and servicing vessel Toisa Pisces.
