= Toisa Pisces =

Hydrocarbon well testing ship

History
- Name: Toisa Pisces; Fresnel (1997–2003)
- Owner: Sealion Shipping Ltd.
- Port of registry: Liberia, Monrovia
- Ordered: October 19, 1995
- Builder: Ulstein Verft, Norway
- Laid down: April 30, 1996
- Launched: January 10, 1997
- Acquired: March 1, 1997
- Identification: Call sign: A8BV3; DNV ID: 19319; IMO number: 9139074

General characteristics
- Class & type: DNV; 648 - Oil Production and Storage Unit
- Tonnage: 6,651 GT; 7,200 DWT
- Length: 103.65 m (340.1 ft)
- Beam: 23.2 m (76 ft)
- Draught: 7.065 m (23.18 ft)
- Depth: 9 m (30 ft)
- Installed power: 10,875 kW
- Propulsion: 3 X Bergan Diesel BRG 9 @ 3,625 kW; 2 X Bergan Diesel 507kW @ 440V 3Ph 60 Hz
- Speed: 12 kn (22 km/h; 14 mph)
- Capacity: Potable water 1,439 m^{3} (50,800 cu ft); Fuel Oil 878 m^{3} (31,000 cu ft); Cargo oil 3,325 m^{3} (20,910 bbl); Oily water 1,415 m^{3} (8,900 bbl)

Toisa Pisces is a Liberia-flagged well test and servicing vessel owned and operated by Sealion Shipping Ltd. She is classified by Det Norske Veritas as an oil production and storage unit.

Toisa Pisces was built in 1997 by Ulstein Verft in Norway as a drilling platform supplier and cable ship. In 1997–2000 she was owned and operated by France Câbles et Radio under the name of Fresnel and under the flag of France. In 2000–2003 she was owned by FT Marine SAS. In 2003, the ship was purchased by Sealion Shipping and it was converted at the Gdańsk Shipyard as oil processing unit. She was renamed Toisa Pisces and registered in Monrovia, Liberia. She has an oil processing capacity up to 20,000 barrels per day (3,200 m^{3}/d).
