= PIER Systems =

American communication technologies company

PIER Systems, Inc.
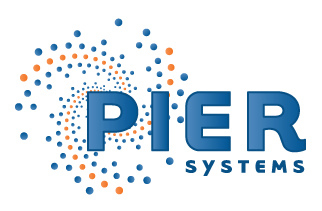
- Industry: Communication Technologies
- Founded: 2000
- Headquarters: Bellingham, Washington
- Key people: Gerald Baron: Founder, Senior VP, Kevin Boxx: CEO, Marc Mullen: Senior VP, John P. "Pat" Philbin, Ph.D.: Senior VP, Dan E. Timmins, Jr.: Regional VP, East Coast, Edwin Grimes: Regional VP, West Coast
- Products: Internet Software & Services

PIER Systems, Inc. is a company that develops and supports an on-demand, web-based, communications software called The PIER System. Their product is designed for information management, crisis communications, business continuity, disaster recovery, public relations, mass notification, news monitoring, press release distribution and the management of documents, contacts, inquiries, and media. Their headquarters is located in Bellingham, WA, with additional offices in the Western and Eastern regions of the United States. PIER is an acronym for Public Information Emergency Response.

PIER Systems, inc. services major oil and energy companies such as BP International, Tesoro Corporation, Shell, Marathon Oil Corporation, Enbridge, Valero Energy Corporation and Ameren; U.S. government organizations such as the U.S. Coast Guard, USDA, Los Angeles Department of Water and Power, American Red Cross, METRO of Harris County (TX) and the Atlanta-Fulton County Emergency Management Agency; educational institutes such as University of Houston, University of North Carolina, Spelman College, Agnes Scott College, and Western Washington University; and commercial companies such as Albertsons, Allstate Insurance Company, Boeing, and Darigold.

== History ==
PIER Systems, Inc. was formed in August, 2000 by Gerald Baron.

On June 10, 1999, the Olympic pipeline burst and poured vast amounts of gasoline into Whatcom Creek in Bellingham, WA. The gas created a massive fire that caused major forest damage and killed 3 people. Back then, Gerald Baron was a communications contractor for Equilon Enterprises (a joint venture between Texaco and Shell), which was the managing partner for the Olympic pipeline. He was responsible for communicating with the public and the press to assure them that the crisis was contained. This demanding task inspired him to create The PIER System—a single system that could streamline the communication problems that organizations face during major disasters by providing the tools they need to distribute information. Baron said “We just saw that there were better ways of solving the communication problem that would really facilitate what needed to be done." - Gerald Baron, 1999

In 2003 PIER Systems, Inc. corporation name was changed to AudienceCentral, Inc. The name was changed back to PIER Systems, Inc. in 2007.

=== Clients ===
- On August 29, 2005, Hurricane Katrina devastated New Orleans, Louisiana. During this time, the United States Coast Guard 8th District, used The PIER System as their means of contact with press and the media. Although they were operating in a facility with no electricity, coast guard officers were able to upload pictures and news updates via cell phone modem to the USCG PIER System website—which then allowed the information to be distributed to media outlets across the country. The USCG 8th District website received more than 2 million visits from people searching for updates and information about affected victims of the tragedy. The USCG's public affairs team also used PIER to manage, track, and respond to hundreds of inquiries and requests.
- On June 28, 2008 during the 2008 California wildfires the United States Forest Service and California Department of Forestry and Fire Protection (Calfire) responded to 1,400 simultaneous wildfires in the Northern California region. At that time their local system was down and they were in need of a mass communication and notification tool. They contacted PIER Systems to create a control center website to be used for communications between the 22 different regional response teams. Within an evening, PIER Systems had created a website and had communications running. The organizations used The PIER System continually for internal and external communication throughout the duration of the fires.
- In September 2008 in response to Hurricane Ike, 12 major organizations including Harris Country Metro, Port of Houston, Marathon Oil, Motiva Port Arthur Refinery, BP, the USCG, and campuses of the University of Houston (TX), used The PIER System as their way of communicating with employees, families, students, press, the media.
- On April 24, 2010, the company registered the domain name deepwaterhorizonresponse.com for use by BP and the United States Coast Guard in the Deepwater Horizon oil spill.
