= Macondo Prospect =

Oil and gas prospect in the Gulf of Mexico

Macondo field
- Location within the United States
- Country: United States
- Region: Gulf of Mexico
- Location: Mississippi Canyon
- Block: 252
- Offshore/onshore: offshore
- Coordinates: 28°44′17″N 88°21′57″W
- Operator: BP
- Partners: BP (90%); MOEX Offshore 2007 (10%)

Field history
- Discovery: 2010

Production
- Estimated oil in place: 50 million barrels (~6.8×10^{6} t)

The Macondo Prospect (Mississippi Canyon Block 252, abbreviated MC252) is an oil and gas prospect in the United States Exclusive Economic Zone of the Gulf of Mexico, off the coast of Louisiana. The prospect was the site of the Deepwater Horizon drilling rig explosion in April 2010 that led to a major oil spill in the region from the first exploration well, named itself MC252-1 (nicknamed also Macondo-1), which had been designed to investigate the existence of the prospect.

== Name ==
Oil companies routinely assign code names to offshore prospects early in the exploration effort. This practice helps ensure secrecy during the confidential pre-sale phase, and later provides convenient names for casual reference rather than the often similar-sounding official lease names denoted by, for example, the Minerals Management Service in the case of federal waters in the USA. Names in a given year or area might follow a theme such as beverages (e.g., Cognac), heavenly bodies (e.g., Mars), or even cartoon characters (e.g., Bullwinkle).

The name Macondo had been the winning selection in a BP employee contest as part of an internal United Way campaign. It comes from the fictitious cursed town in the novel One Hundred Years of Solitude by Colombian Nobel Prize-winning writer Gabriel García Márquez.

== Location ==
The prospect is located in Mississippi Canyon Block 252 of the Gulf of Mexico. BP is the operator and principal developer of the oil field with 90% of interest, the final 10% by MOEX Offshore 2007, a unit of Mitsui. Originally, Anadarko Petroleum owned 25% stake but in October 2011 this was transferred to BP as a part of a wider settlement between the companies. The prospect may have held 50 million barrels (7.9×10^{6} m^{3}) producible reserves of oil. It is 41 miles (66 km) offshore and 130 miles (210 km) from New Orleans.

== Geological target ==
The geological formation targeted by the well was hydrocarbon-bearing "mid-"Miocene turbiditic sands. The depth of the formation was estimated between 4000 and 4500 m below the sea floor.

== History ==
In 1998, a regional shallow hazards survey and study was carried out at the Macondo area by KC Offshore. High resolution, 2D seismic data along with 3D exploration seismic data of the MC 252 was collected by Fugro Geoservices in 2003. BP purchased the mineral rights to drill for oil in the Macondo Prospect at the Minerals Management Service's lease sale in March 2008.

Mapping of the block was carried out by BP America in 2008 and 2009. BP secured approval to drill the Macondo Prospect from MMS in March 2009. An exploration well was scheduled to be drilled in 2009.

On October 7, 2009, the Transocean Marianas semi-submersible rig commenced drilling, but operations were halted at 4,023 feet (1,226 m) below the sea floor on November 29, 2009, when the rig was damaged by Hurricane Ida. The Transocean Deepwater Horizon rig resumed drilling operations in February 2010.

== Deepwater Horizon explosion and blowout ==
An explosion on the drilling rig Deepwater Horizon occurred on April 20, 2010, killing 11 workers. The Deepwater Horizon sank on April 22, 2010, in water approximately 5,000 feet (1,500 m) deep, and was located resting on the seafloor approximately 1,300 feet (400 m) (about a quarter of a mile) northwest of the well.

Following the rig explosion and subsea blowout, BP started a relief well using Transocean's Development Driller III on May 2, 2010. The relief well would potentially take up to three months to drill. BP started a second relief well using Transocean's GSF Development Driller II on May 16, 2010.

The well was successfully sealed off from flow into the sea on August 4, 2010, by a "static kill" (injection of heavy fluids and cement into the wellhead at the mudline). To further ensure the plugging of the original well, the first relief well established communication with the original wellbore near total depth and injected heavy fluids and cement.

== See also ==
- List of oil spills
- Offshore oil and gas in the US Gulf of Mexico
