= HFR =

HFR or Hfr may refer to:

- High frame rate, in motion pictures
- Hfr cell, or Hfr strain, a bacterium with a conjugative plasmid
