= S. Elizabeth Birnbaum =

American government official

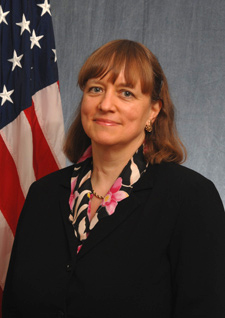

Director of US Department of Interior's Minerals Management Service
- In office July 15, 2009 – May 27, 2010
- Preceded by: Walter Cruickshank
- Succeeded by: Michael R. Bromwich

Personal details
- Born: Susan Elizabeth Birnbaum

Susan Elizabeth "Liz" Birnbaum served as Director of the Minerals Management Service in the United States from July 15, 2009, to May 27, 2010. Birnbaum was in charge of administering "programs that ensure the effective management of renewable energy [...] and traditional energy and mineral resources on the nation's Outer Continental Shelf, including the environmentally safe exploration, development, and production of oil and natural gas, as well as the collection and distribution of revenues for minerals developed on federal and American Indian lands."

== Career ==
=== Early career and education ===
From 1987 to 1991 Birnbaum was counsel for the Water Resources Program of the National Wildlife Federation, where she litigated on behalf of that organization in federal courts. From 1991 to 1999 she was counsel to the House Committee on Natural Resources, where she handled legislative and oversight activities for the Department of the Interior, U.S. Forest Service, and electric power marketing administrations. At the Department of the Interior, Birnbaum was Associate Solicitor for Mineral Resources from 2000 to 2001, supervising and managing a staff of attorneys that provided legal advice, developed regulations and conducted litigation on minerals issues for the Minerals Management Service, Bureau of Land Management, and Office of Surface Mining and Reclamation. In addition, she was a special assistant to the Interior Solicitor, from 1999 to 2000, overseeing legal policy on a range of natural resource issues, including mining law, public land management and hydropower licensing. From 2001 to 2007, she was vice president for Government Affairs and General Counsel for American Rivers, where she directed advocacy programs for the nation's leading river conservation organization. In that role, she testified regularly to Congress regarding river conservation issues .

Before her appointment to the Minerals Management Service, Birnbaum was staff director for the Committee on House Administration, where she oversaw strategy development, budget management and staff activities for the committee that manages legislative branch agencies.

Birnbaum received her Juris Doctor from Harvard University in 1984 and her A.B. degree, magna cum laude, from Brown University in 1979. She was Editor in Chief of the Harvard Environmental Law Review, Volume 8.

=== Minerals Management Services ===
As MMS Director, Birnbaum administered programs that ensure the effective management of renewable energy, such as wind, wave, ocean current energy, and traditional energy and mineral resources on the nation's Outer Continental Shelf, including the environmentally safe exploration, development, and production of oil and natural gas.

==== Resignation ====
On May 27, 2010, Birnbaum resigned her position. She resigned "on her own terms and on her own volition," according to Ken Salazar, the United States Secretary of the Interior. The resignation came during the controversial Deepwater Horizon oil spill and Salazar's subsequent announcement that the Minerals Management Service would be reorganized. She was replaced by Michael Bromwich, a litigation attorney and former federal prosecutor with a history of overseeing troubled federal agencies.

=== Post-MMS career ===
Starting in January 2011, Birnbaum operated an environmental consulting firm, SEB Strategies, LLC. Since February 2018, she has served as senior counsel and director of advocacy at philanthropy consulting firm Arabella Advisors.

On April 17, 2014, Birnbaum co-authored an opinion editorial in The New York Times with Jacqueline Savitz titled "The Deepwater Horizon Threat". Shortly after, she was interviewed by journalist Amy Goodman on the Democracy Now! news hour.

=== Volunteer work ===
Birnbaum has been an officer and member of numerous boards and commissions, including the National Capital Section of the American Water Resources Association; Arlington County Environment and Energy Conservation Commission, and the Environment, Energy and Natural Resources Section of the District of Columbia Bar.

From 2014 to 2017, she served as co-chair of the Arlington County and City of Alexandria Joint Task Force to restore Four Mile Run. Starting in 2017, she has served on the Alexandria Park and Recreation Commission. Birnbaum has been a board member for the Alexandria Harmonizers since 2015.
