= Development Driller III =

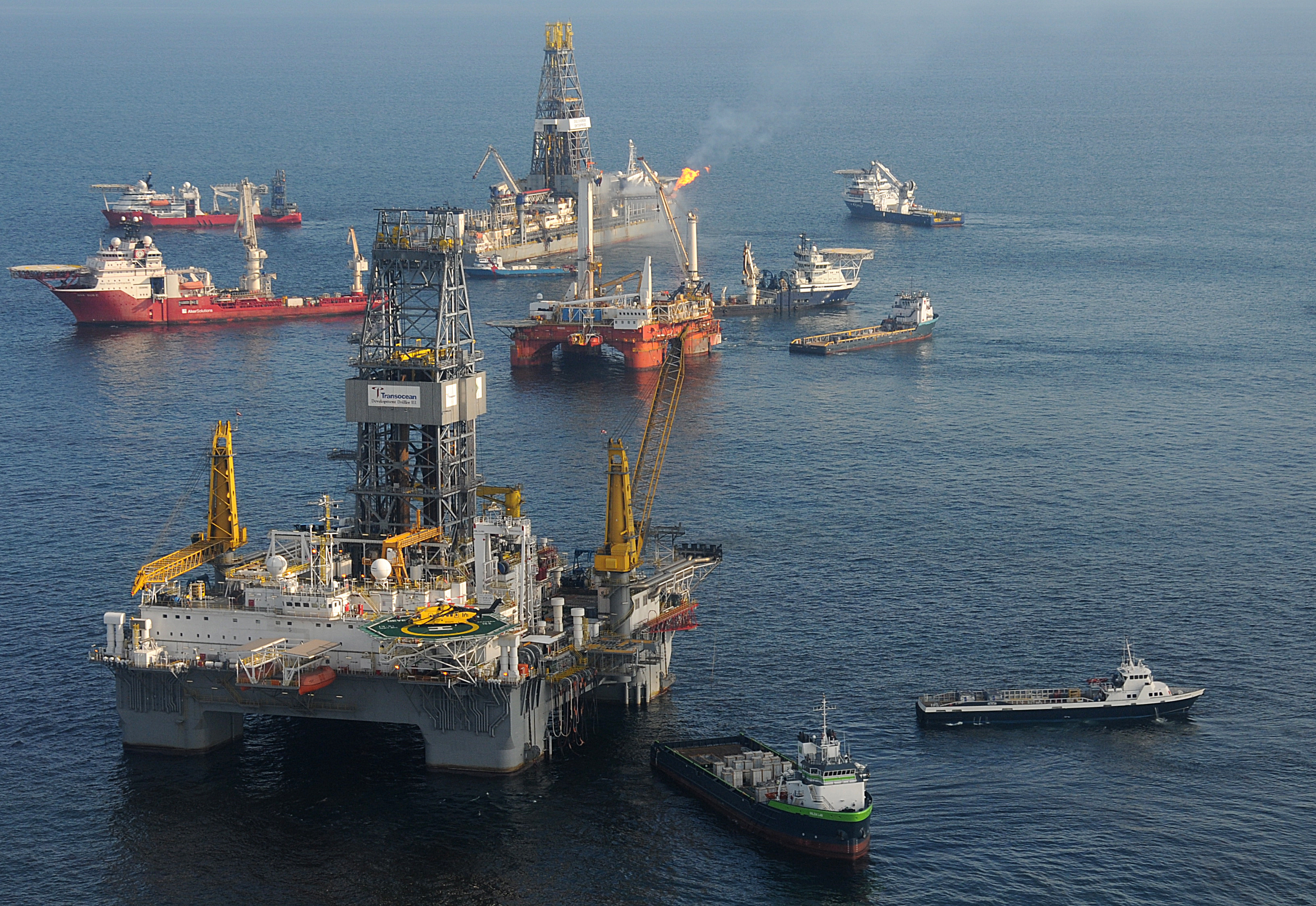
- Development Driller III, Q4000, Discoverer Enterprise on the site of the Deepwater Horizon oil spill on 18 May 2010

History
- Name: Development Driller III
- Owner: Transocean
- Operator: Transocean
- Port of registry: Vanuatu, Port Vila
- Ordered: 12 January 2006
- Builder: Keppel AmFELS, Singapore
- Laid down: 25 November 2006
- Acquired: 22 May 2009
- Identification: ABS class no.:09172785; Call sign: YJVD2; DNV ID: 30254; IMO number: 8769121; MMSI number: 576281000
- Status: Scrapped

General characteristics
- Tonnage: 37,981 GT; 23,513 DWT
- Length: 117 m (384 ft)
- Beam: 78 m (256 ft)
- Draught: 19 m (62 ft)
- Depth: 37 m (121 ft)
- Deck clearance: 77.10 m (253.0 ft)
- Propulsion: 8 × Caterpillar 3616 diesel engines
- Capacity: Diesel oil: 4,546.7 m^{3} (160,570 cu ft); Freshwater: 2,934.98 m^{3} (103,648 cu ft); Lube oil: 71.78 m^{3} (2,535 cu ft); Tank ballast: 21,891.81 m^{3} (773,102 cu ft); Other: 341.84 m^{3} (12,072 cu ft)
- Crew: 200

Development Driller III is a fifth generation, Vanuatu-flagged dynamic positioning semi-submersible ultra-deepwater drilling rig owned by Transocean and operated under lease agreements by various petroleum exploration and production companies worldwide. The vessel is capable of drilling in water depths up to 7,500 feet (2,300 m) with drilling depth of 35,000 feet (11,000 m), upgradeable to 37,500 feet (11,400 m).

On 2 May 2010, Development Driller III started drilling a relief well on Macondo Prospect to stop massive oil spill caused by the explosion and subsequent loss of the Deepwater Horizon.
