= Steve Wereley =

American engineer

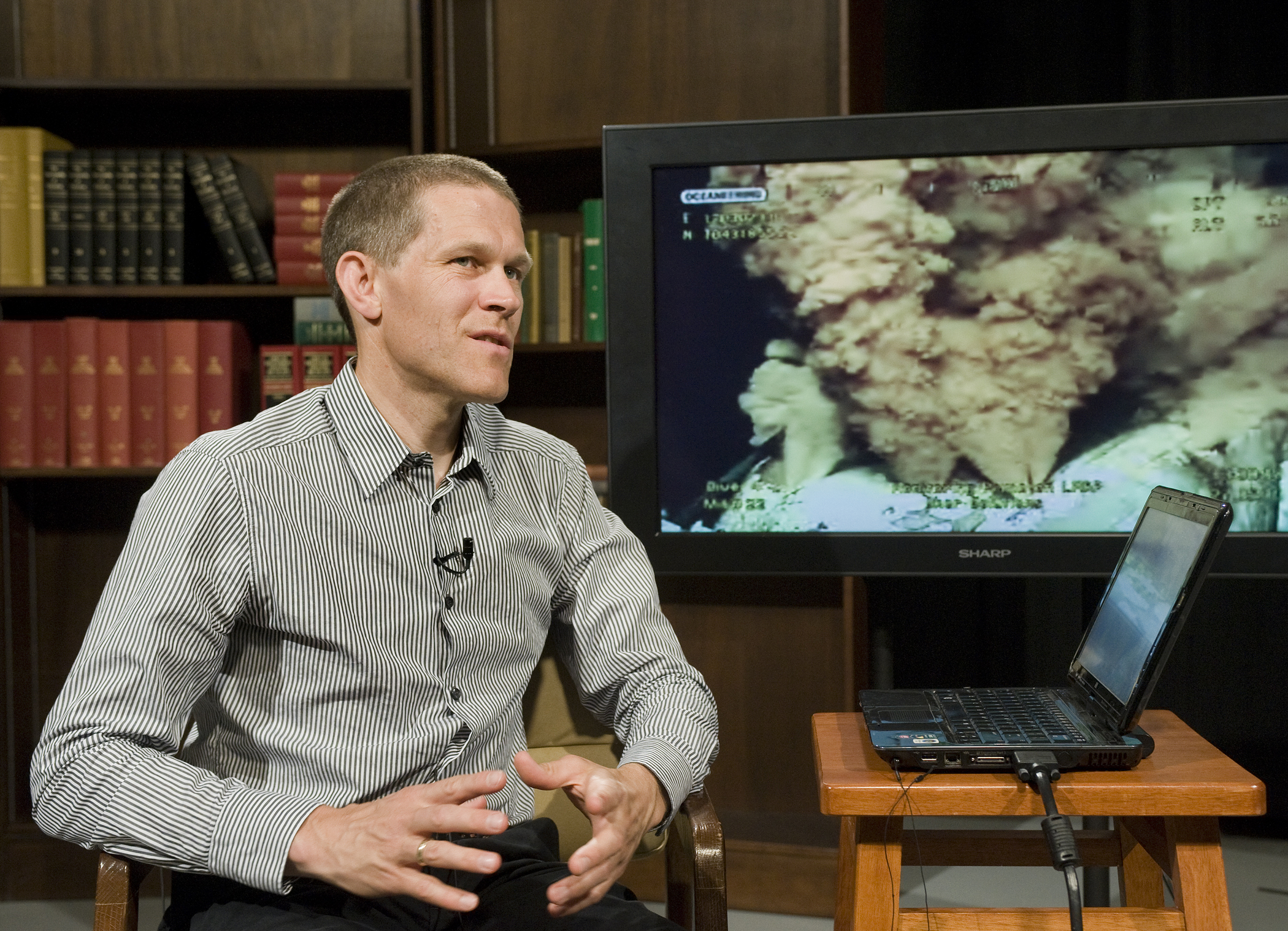
Wereley being interviewed about the Deepwater Horizon oil spill in 2010.

Steve Wereley is a professor of mechanical engineering at Ohio University. He was previously at Purdue University. His areas of research include Micro- and Nanofluidics, Particle Image Velocimetry, Opto-microfluidics and bio-MEMS. He is the co-inventor of micro-PIV.

== Education ==
In 1990, Wereley completed his undergraduate degrees in mechanical engineering at Washington University in St. Louis, and physics at Lawrence University. Wereley earned M.S. and Ph.D. degrees from Northwestern University in 1992 and 1997, respectively. He spent two years working with Carl Meinhart at the University of California Santa Barbara, specializing in microfluidic diagnostic techniques.

== Career ==
In 1999, Wereley became an assistant professor of mechanical engineering at Purdue University. In 2005, Wereley was promoted to associate professor and in 2010 to professor. In 2025, Wereley moved to Ohio University.

=== Deepwater Horizon ===
Wereley played an important role in assessing the Deepwater Horizon oil spill in the summer of 2010. On May 13, 2010, he was among the first scientists to report that the actual flow rate of oil out of the well was considerably higher than the official estimate at the time. After the disaster the National Commission on the BP Deepwater Horizon Oil Spill and Offshore Drilling found that the "...Wereley estimates (and at least some of BP‘s internal estimates) proved to be significantly more accurate than the initial official estimates." Wereley was invited to brief the House Subcommittee on Energy and the Environment about his findings. He was also asked to join the Flow Rate Technical Group (FRTG), a group of scientists assembled by the Department of the Interior to address the flow rate issue. The FRTG issued a final peer-reviewed report on July 21, 2010, and contributed to the official US government oil flow rate estimate announced on August 2, 2010. In October 2010 Wereley was awarded the United States Geological Survey Director's Award for his work on the FRTG team.

== Publications ==
=== Books ===
- N.T. Nguyen and S.T. Wereley, Fundamentals and Applications of Microfluidics, Artech House, Boston, (First edition, 2002; second edition, 2006). (ISBN 978-1-58053-972-2)
- M. Raffel, C. Willert, S.T. Wereley, J. Kompenhans, Particle Image Velocimetry: A Practical Guide, Springer, New York (2007). (ISBN 978-3-540-72307-3)

=== Journal articles ===
- A. Kumar, S.J. Williams, H.S. Chuang, N.G. Green and S.T. Wereley, "Hybrid opto-electric manipulation in microfluidics—opportunities and challenges", Lab on a Chip (2011). doi:10.1039/c1lc20208a cover article
- Y.H. Kim, C. Cierpka and S.T. Wereley, "Flow field around a vibrating cantilever: coherent structure education by continuous wavelet transform and proper orthogonal decomposition," J. Fluid Mech., Vol. 669, pp. 584–606. (2011). doi:10.1017/S0022112010005318
- S.T. Wereley and C.D. Meinhart, "Recent Advances in Micro Particle Image Velocimetry," Annual Review of Fluid Mechanics, Vol. 42 (2010). doi:10.1146/annurev-fluid-121108-145427
- C.D. Meinhart, S.T. Wereley, and J.G. Santiago, "PIV Measurements of a Microchannel Flow," Exp. Fluids, Vol. 27, No. 5, 414-419, (1999).
- J.G. Santiago, S.T. Wereley, C.D. Meinhart, D. Beebee, and R.J. Adrian, "A particle image velocimetry system for microfluidics," Exp. Fluids, Vol. 25, No. 4, 316-319, (1998).
- S.T. Wereley and R.M. Lueptow, "Spatio-temporal character of nonwavy and wavy Taylor Couette flow," J. Fluid Mech. Vol. 364, 59-80, (1998).
