= GSF Development Driller II =

Type of oil rig

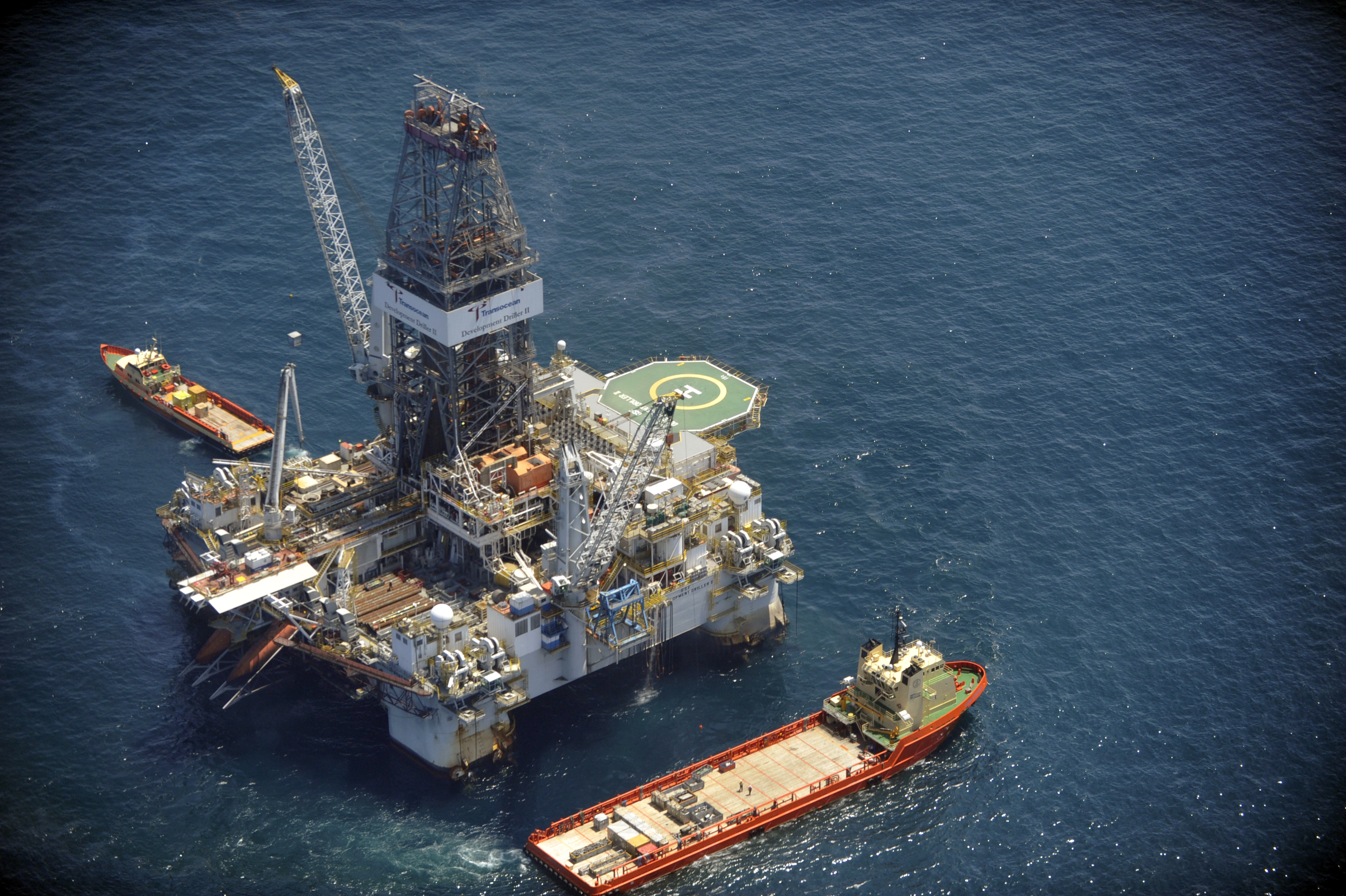

History
- Name: GSF Development Driller II
- Owner: Transocean
- Operator: Transocean
- Port of registry: Vanuatu, Port Vila
- Ordered: 2 December 2002
- Builder: PPL Shipyard Pte Ltd (primary); Jurong Shipyard Pte Ltd (subcontractor); Singapore
- Laid down: 26 May 2003
- Launched: 19 June 2004
- Acquired: 19 February 2005
- Identification: ABS class no.: 8765515; Call sign: YJUL9; DNV ID: 29750; IMO number: 8765515; MMSI number: 576971000
- Status: Operational

General characteristics
- Class & type: American Bureau of Shipping: A1, AMS, DPS-2
- Tonnage: 30,236 GT; 9,070 NT
- Length: 115.7 m (380 ft)
- Beam: 78.68 m (258.1 ft)
- Draught: operating: 17 to 20 m (56 to 66 ft); Transit: 8.3 m (27 ft)
- Depth: 37 m (121 ft)
- Deck clearance: 16,016 m (52,546 ft)
- Propulsion: 8 × 4,300 hp
- Capacity: Base oil: 730 m^{3} (26,000 cu ft); Freshwater: 755 m^{3} (26,700 cu ft); Lube oil: 71.78 m^{3} (2,535 cu ft); Tank ballast: 21,891.81 m^{3} (773,102 cu ft); Fuel oil: 3,226 m^{3} (113,900 cu ft)
- Crew: 176

GSF Development Driller II is a fifth generation, Vanuatu-flagged dynamic positioning semi-submersible ultra-deepwater drilling rig owned and operated by Transocean. The vessel is capable of drilling in water depths up to 7,500 ft (2,300 m) with drilling depth of 35,000 ft (11,000 m), upgradeable to 37,500 ft (11,400 m).

Development Driller II was deployed in drilling a relief well on the Macondo Prospect to stop the oil spill caused by the explosion and subsequent loss of Deepwater Horizon.
