= Q4000 =

Oil field service vessel

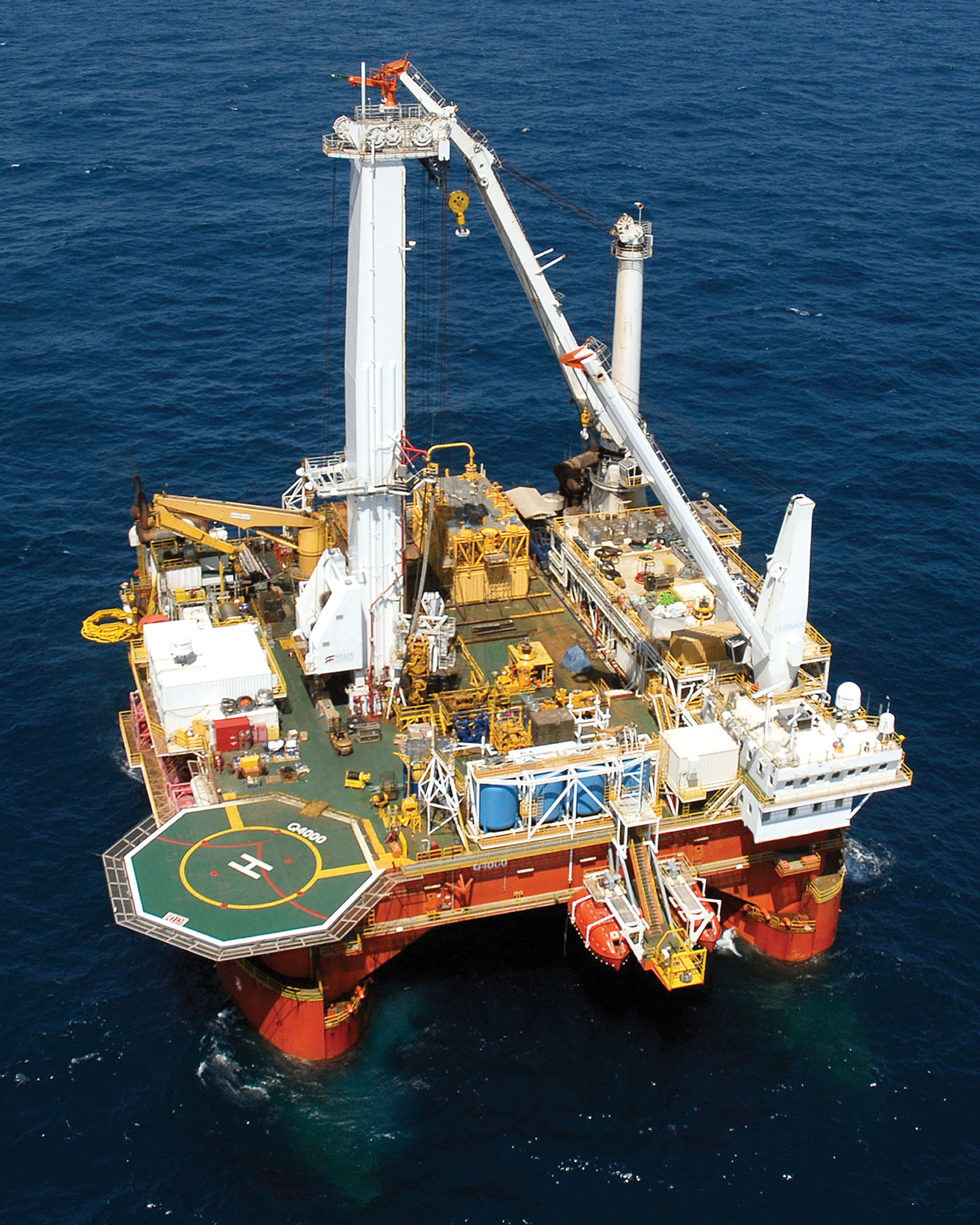
- Drilling vessel Helix Q4000 at sea in the Gulf of Mexico.

History
- Name: Q4000
- Owner: Cal Dive Title XI, Inc.
- Operator: Helix Energy Solutions Group
- Port of registry: United States, Houston, Texas
- Ordered: 1999
- Builder: Keppel AmFELS; Brownsville, Texas
- Cost: US$156 million
- Laid down: 18 December 1999
- Completed: 07 March 2002
- Identification: ABS class no.: 0239326; Call sign: WDA6676; DNV ID: 24342; IMO number: 8767123; MMSI number: 369550000
- Status: Operational

General characteristics
- Class & type: American Bureau of Shipping; A1, Column Stabilized MODU
- Tonnage: 14,802 GT
- Length: 95.2 m (312 ft)
- Beam: 62.8 m (206 ft)
- Depth: 29.6 m (97 ft)
- Deck clearance: 9,436 mm (371.5 in)
- Speed: 12 kts
- Crew: 133

Q4000 is a multi-purpose oil field construction and intervention vessel ordered in 1999 by Cal Dive International, and was built at the Keppel AmFELS shipyard in Brownsville, Texas for $180 million. She was delivered in 2002 and operates under the flag of the United States. She is operated by Helix Energy Solutions Group. The original Q4000 concept was conceived and is owned by SPD/McClure. The design was later modified by Bennett Offshore, which was selected to develop both the basic and detailed design.

Q4000 has a column-stabilized semisubmersible design that combines dynamically positioned station-keeping with a large deck space, significant deck load capacity and a high transit speed of 12 knots. The vessel provides a stable platform for a wide variety of tasks, including subsea completion, decommissioning and coiled tubing deployment, and she is specifically designed for oil well intervention and construction in depths of up to 3000 meters of water.

== Specifications ==
The design of the Q4000 includes the following features:

- Dynamic positioning with 6 azimuthing thrusters
- A multi-purpose Huisman designed three-sided tower capable of fulfilling all traditional derrick roles
- Two Huisman cranes with lifting capacities of 160 and 360 Tonnes
- Seabed access to 3048 meters
- An 11.9 meter x 6.4 meter moonpool
- A 7 3/8 inch intervention riser system (The vessel was refitted with a slimbore drilling capability in 2008).
- A 3000-meter heavy weather ROV system
- An overall deck capacity of 4,000 tonnes

== Deepwater Horizon spill response ==
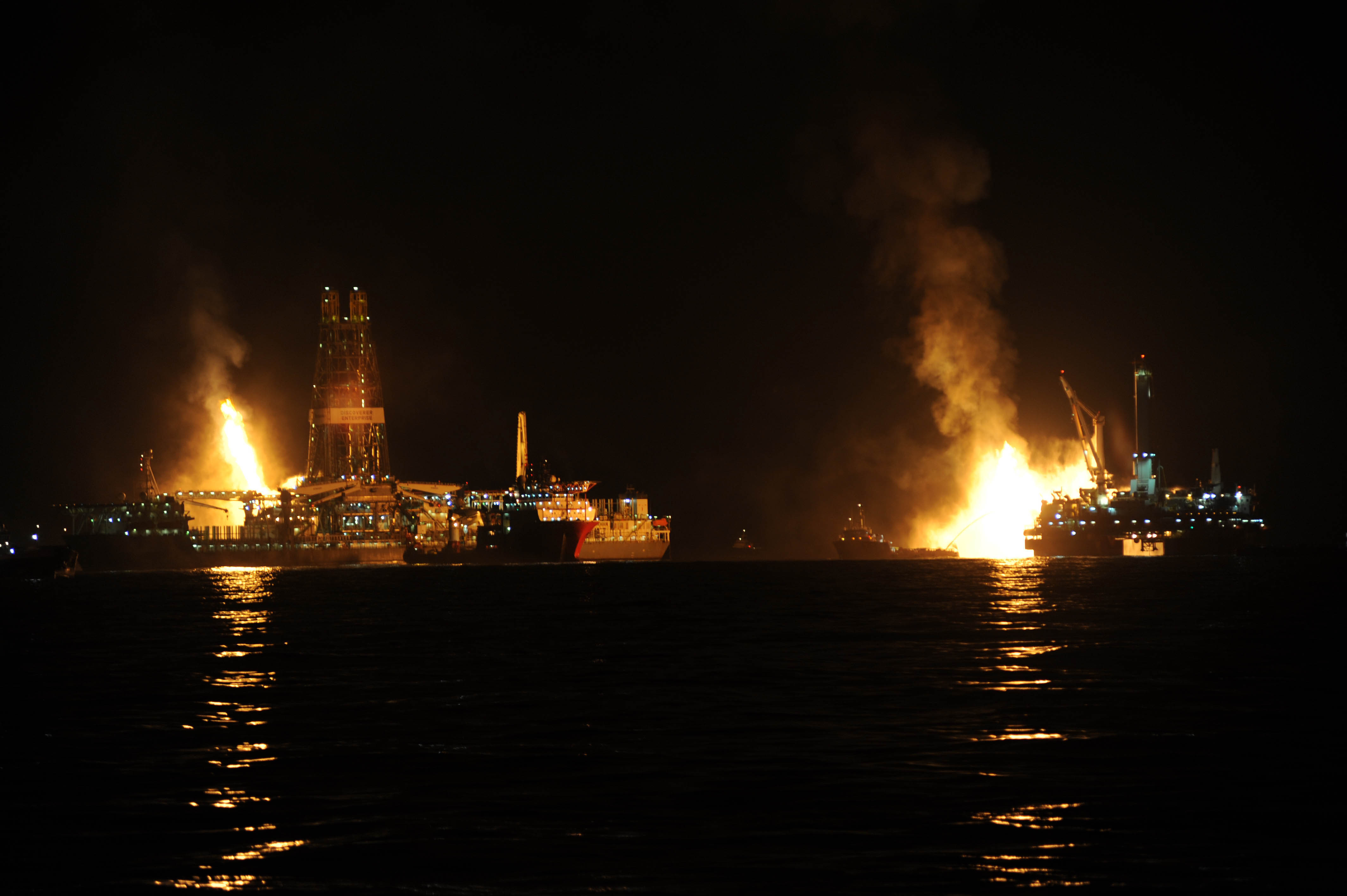
Q4000 and Discoverer Enterprise flare off gas at the site of drilling operations at the Deepwater Horizon response site in the Gulf of Mexico at night 8 July 2010.

Q4000 was in the Gulf of Mexico participating in the response to the Deepwater Horizon oil spill. The vessel was used to position the large containment dome and also to attempt the "top kill" in which large quantities of drilling mud were pumped down the Q4000 drilling pipe into the failed Deepwater Horizon blowout preventer valve (BOP) in an attempt to stop the flow of oil. Both attempts failed to stop the oil leaking from the well. After removal of the failed riser and drill pipe on the Horizon BOP, a capping stack sealed the top of the well on July 15, 2010, stopping the flow of oil into the Gulf of Mexico. The Q4000 was used in a successful static kill procedure, where mud, followed by cement, was pumped into the well, sealing the leak at the source. The Deepwater Horizon BOP was secured on the deck of the Q4000 around 10:20pm on September 4, 2010. The failed Deepwater Horizon BOP was collected as key evidence into the investigation of the causes of the oil spill.
