= Top kill =

Oil well control technique

A top kill is a procedure used as a means of regaining control over an oil well that is producing crude petroleum or natural gas at a rate that is becoming difficult to govern, and/or is anticipated to become uncontrollable without intervention. This procedure is not used when control has been completely lost over the well, such as in a blowout. The process involves pumping heavyweight drilling mud or drilling fluid downwards into the well. This procedure is expected to stop the flow of oil and gas from the well by neutralizing the pressure differential between the source and the top of the well. A further step could be sealing the well completely, often with cement.

== In use ==
The top kill procedure was used to plug flaming oil wells, blown up by retreating Iraqi forces, in 1991, during the Gulf War.

This technique came to prominence during the 2010 Deepwater Horizon oil spill when it was used in an attempt to seal a seafloor oil well after the failure of the blowout preventer. However, it failed to block the flow of oil.

== See also ==
- Well kill
- Blowout preventer
