= Flow Rate Technical Group =

Group of specialists to estimate flow from the Deepwater Horizon oil spill

The Flow Rate Technical Group is a group of scientists and engineers from the United States federal government, universities, and research institutions created May 19, 2010, for an official scientific-based estimate of the flow of oil in the Deepwater Horizon oil spill. It issued an interim report on May 27, 2010. It was convened again on June 10 by Coast Guard Admiral Thad Allen after the drilling riser from the well was cut by Maxx3 ROV Dive #35 on May 31, 2010, in an attempt to redirect the flow. Large amounts of oil were not being captured and the group was convened to estimate how much.

== Membership ==
The group is led by Marcia McNutt.

Members of the group are:

- Bill Lehr, National Oceanic and Atmospheric Administration (Lead)
- Alberto Aliseda, Assistant Professor of Mechanical Engineering, University of Washington
- Paul Bommer, Senior Lecturer, Petroleum and Geosystems Engineering, University of Texas at Austin
- Peter Cornillon, Professor of Oceanography, University of Rhode Island
- Pedro Espina, National Institute of Standards and Technology
- Juan Lasheras, Prof. of Engineering and Applied Sciences, University of California, San Diego
- Ira Leifer, Assoc. Researcher, Marine Science Institute, University of California Santa Barbara
- James Riley, Professor of Mechanical Engineering, University of Washington
- Omer Savas, Professor of Mechanical Engineering, University of California Berkeley
- Franklin Shaffer, Senior Research Engineer, National Energy Technology Laboratory, Department of Energy
- Steve Wereley, Professor of Mechanical Engineering, Purdue University
- Poojitha Yapa, Professor of Civil and Environmental Engineering, Clarkson University

== Plume modeling ==
Particle image velocimetry analysis was used on video of the oil/gas mixture escaping from the damaged well to estimate fluid velocity and flow volume.

== Mass balance ==
Remote sensing data from the deployment of the Airborne Visible InfraRed Imaging Spectrometer (AVIRIS) and satellite imagery was used to calculate the amount of oil on the ocean surface every day. The figures were corrected for oil which had evaporated, been skimmed, burned, and dispersed up to that day and, subsequently, divided by time to produce an average rate of flow.

- Victor Labson, Director, Crustal Geophysics and Geochemistry Science Center (lead)
- Roger N. Clark, Lead Scientist, Research Physical Scientist
- Gregg A. Swayze, research geologist
- Todd M. Hoefen, research geophysicist
- Raymond Kokaly, research geophysicist
- K. Eric Livo, research geophysicist
- Michael H. Powers, research geophysicist
- Geoffrey S. Plumlee, research geologist
- Gregory P. Meeker, research geologist

== Reservoir modeling ==
Reservoir modeling describes geologic formations. It also describes the composition and pressures of the oil, natural gas, and other compounds that were released. Using open-hole logs; pressure, volume, and temperature data; core samples; and analog well or reservoir data; the team populated computer models and determined flow rate from targeted sands in the well as a function of bottom-hole pressure.

- Don Maclay, Petroleum Engineer, MMS Gulf Regional Office (Lead)
- Other MMS engineers

== Nodal analysis ==
Nodal analysis was used to calculate fluid compositions, properties, and fluxes from both before and after riser removal. The information used in these calculations came from reservoir modeling (including pressure, temperature, fluid composition and properties over time) and pressure and temperature conditions at the leak points on the sea floor, along with details of the geometries of the well, BOP, and riser.

- George Guthrie, National Energy Technology Laboratory, Department of Energy (Lead)
- Roger Aines, Lawrence Livermore National Laboratory, Department of Energy
- Grant Bromhal, National Energy Technology Laboratory, Department of Energy
- Roy Long, National Energy Technology Laboratory, Department of Energy
- David Hetrick, Oak Ridge National Laboratory, Department of Energy
- Bryan Morreale, National Energy Technology Laboratory, Department of Energy
- Curt Oldenburg, Lawrence Berkeley National Laboratory, Department of Energy
- Rajesh Pawar, Los Alamos National Laboratory, Department of Energy
- Jud Virden, Pacific Northwest National Laboratory, Department of Energy
