= Deepwater Horizon oil spill =

2010 environmental disaster

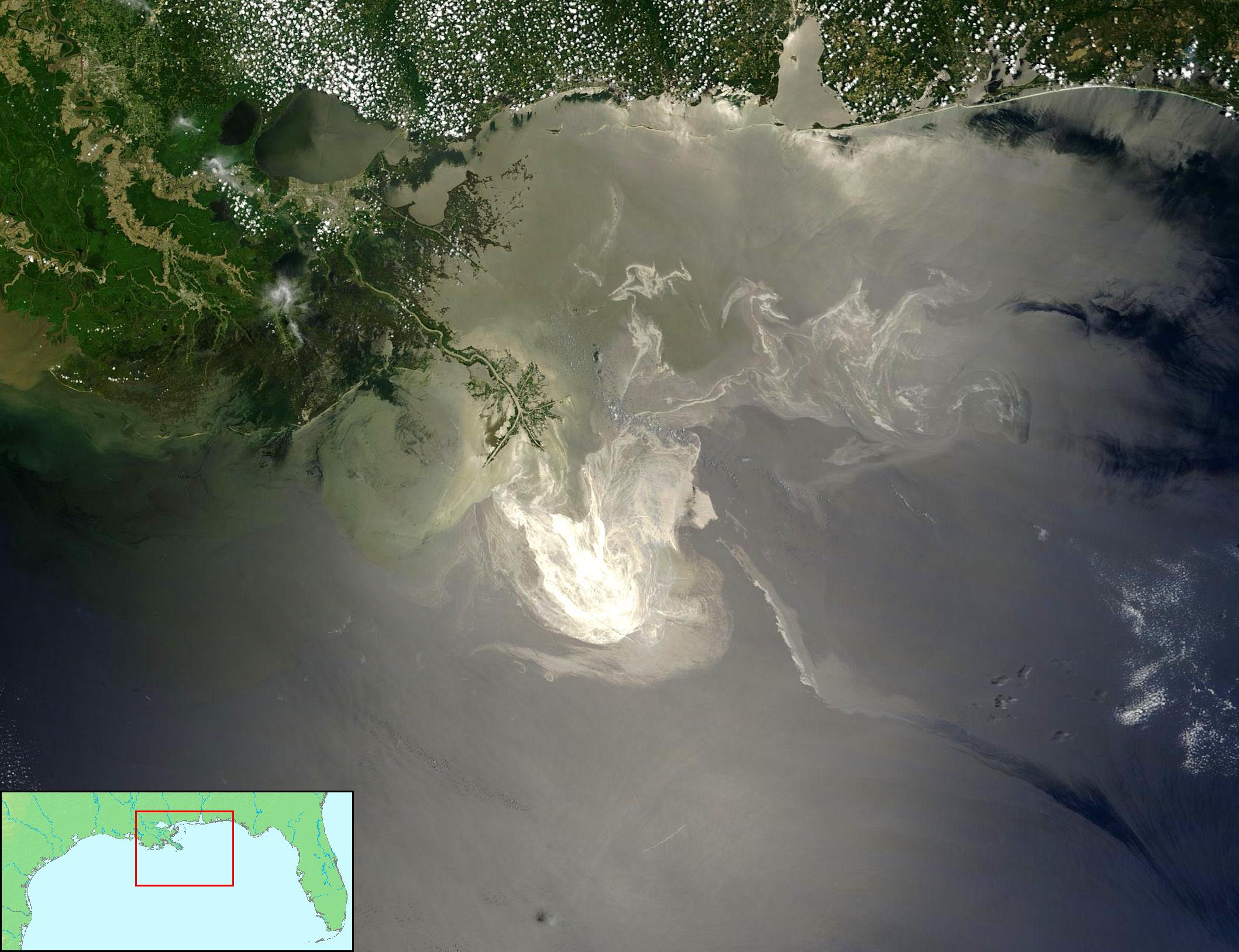
- As seen from space by the Terra satellite on 24 May 2010
- Interactive map of Deepwater Horizon oil spill
- Location: Macondo Prospect (Mississippi Canyon Block 252), in the North-central Gulf of Mexico, United States (south of Louisiana)
- Coordinates: 28°44′17″N 88°21′58″W
- Date: 20 April – 19 September 2010 (4 months, 4 weeks and 2 days)

Cause
- Cause: Wellhead blowout
- Casualties: 11 people killed 17 people injured
- Operator: Transocean under contract for BP

Spill characteristics
- Volume: 4.9 million barrels (210,000,000 U.S. gallons; 780,000 cubic meters) ±10%
- Area: 2,500 to 68,000 sq mi (6,500 to 176,100 km^{2})

External videos
- Frontline: The Spill (54:25), Frontline on PBS

Beginning on 20 April 2010, an explosion of the Deepwater Horizon oil platform caused an oil spill and an environmental disaster off the coast of the United States in the Gulf of Mexico, on the BP-operated Macondo Prospect. It is considered the largest marine oil spill in the history of the petroleum industry and estimated to be 8 to 31 percent larger in volume than the previous largest, the Ixtoc I oil spill, also in the Gulf of Mexico. The United States federal government estimated the total discharge at 4.9 million barrels (210,000,000 US gal; 780,000 m^{3}). After several failed efforts to contain the flow, the well was declared sealed on 19 September 2010. Reports in early 2012 indicated that the well site was still leaking. The Deepwater Horizon oil spill is regarded as one of the largest environmental disasters in world history.

A massive response ensued to protect beaches, wetlands and estuaries from the spreading oil utilizing skimmer ships, floating booms, controlled burns and 1,840,000 US gal (7,000 m^{3}) of oil dispersant. Due to the months-long spill, along with adverse effects from the response and cleanup activities, extensive damage to marine and wildlife habitats and fishing and tourism industries was reported. In Louisiana, oil cleanup crews worked four days a week on 55 mi (89 km) of Louisiana shoreline throughout 2013. 4,900,000 lb (2,200 t) of oily material was removed from the beaches in 2013, over double the amount collected in 2012. Oil continued to be found as far from the Macondo site as the waters off the Florida panhandle and Tampa Bay, where scientists said the oil and dispersant mixture is embedded in the sand. In April 2013, it was reported that dolphins and other marine life continued to die in record numbers with infant dolphins dying at six times the normal rate. One study released in 2014 reported that tuna and amberjack exposed to oil from the spill developed deformities of the heart and other organs which would be expected to be fatal or at least life-shortening; another study found that cardiotoxicity might have been widespread in animal life exposed to the spill.

Numerous investigations examined the causes of the explosion and record-setting oil spill. A US government report, published in September 2011, identified defective cementing of the well as a major cause and assigned most responsibility to BP, while also faulting rig operator Transocean and contractor Halliburton. Earlier in 2011, a White House commission similarly blamed BP and its partners for cost-cutting decisions and inadequate safety systems. The commission also concluded that the disaster reflected systemic failures and warned that, without major reforms to industry practices and government policy, a similar event could occur again.

In November 2012, BP and the United States Department of Justice settled federal criminal charges, with BP pleading guilty to 11 counts of manslaughter, two misdemeanors, and a felony count of lying to the United States Congress. BP also agreed to four years of government monitoring of its safety practices and ethics, and the Environmental Protection Agency announced that BP would be temporarily banned from new contracts with the US government. BP and the Department of Justice agreed to a record-setting $4.525 billion in fines and other payments. In September 2014, a US district court judge ruled that BP was primarily responsible for the oil spill because of its gross negligence and reckless conduct. In April 2016, BP agreed to pay $20.8 billion in fines, the largest environmental damage settlement in US history. As of 2018, cleanup costs, charges and penalties had cost the company more than $65 billion.

== Background ==
=== Deepwater Horizon drilling rig ===
Deepwater Horizon was a 10-year-old semi-submersible, mobile, floating, dynamically positioned drilling rig that could operate in waters up to 10,000 ft (3,000 m) deep. Built by South Korean company Hyundai Heavy Industries and owned by Transocean, the rig operated under the Marshallese flag of convenience, and was chartered to BP from March 2008 to September 2013. It was drilling a deep exploratory well, 18,360 ft (5,600 m) below sea level, in approximately 5,100 ft (1,600 m) of water. The well is situated in the Macondo Prospect in Mississippi Canyon Block 253 (MC253) of the Gulf of Mexico, in the United States' exclusive economic zone. The Macondo well is found roughly 41 mi (66 km) off the Louisiana coast. BP was the operator and principal developer of the Macondo Prospect with a 65% share, while 25% was owned by Anadarko Petroleum, and 10% by MOEX Offshore 2007, a unit of Mitsui.

=== Explosion ===
Supply boats battling the fire, viewed from a Coast Guard helicopter

At approximately 7:45 pm CDT, on 20 April 2010, high-pressure methane gas from the well expanded into the marine riser and rose into the drilling rig, where it ignited and exploded, engulfing the platform. Eleven missing workers were never found despite a three-day U.S. Coast Guard (USCG) search operation and are believed to have died in the explosion or its aftermath. Ninety-four crew members were rescued by lifeboat or helicopter, 17 of whom were treated for injuries. The Deepwater Horizon sank on the morning of 22 April 2010.

== Volume and extent of oil spill ==
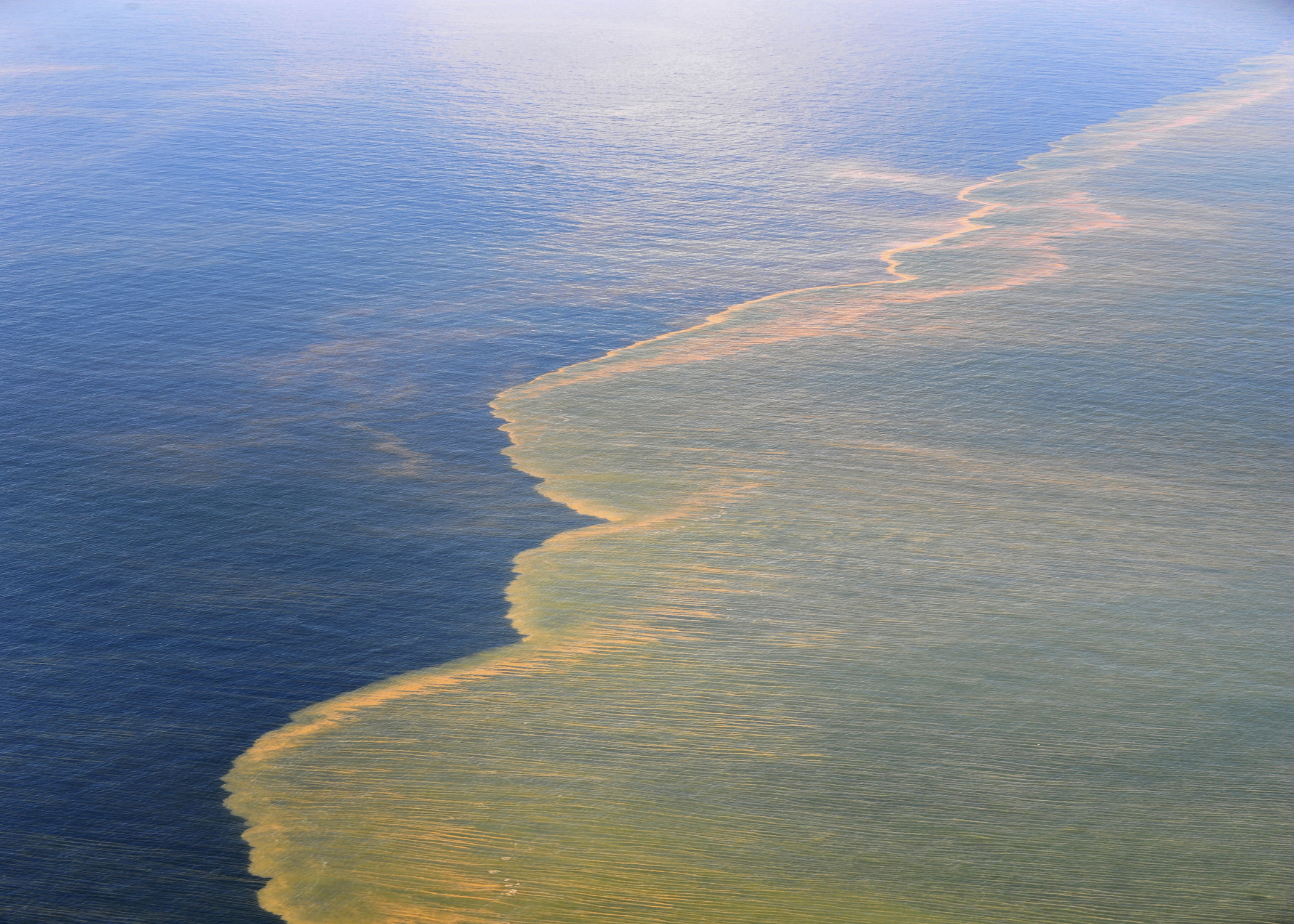
Oil from the Deepwater Horizon oil spill approaches the coast of Mobile, Alabama, 6 May 2010

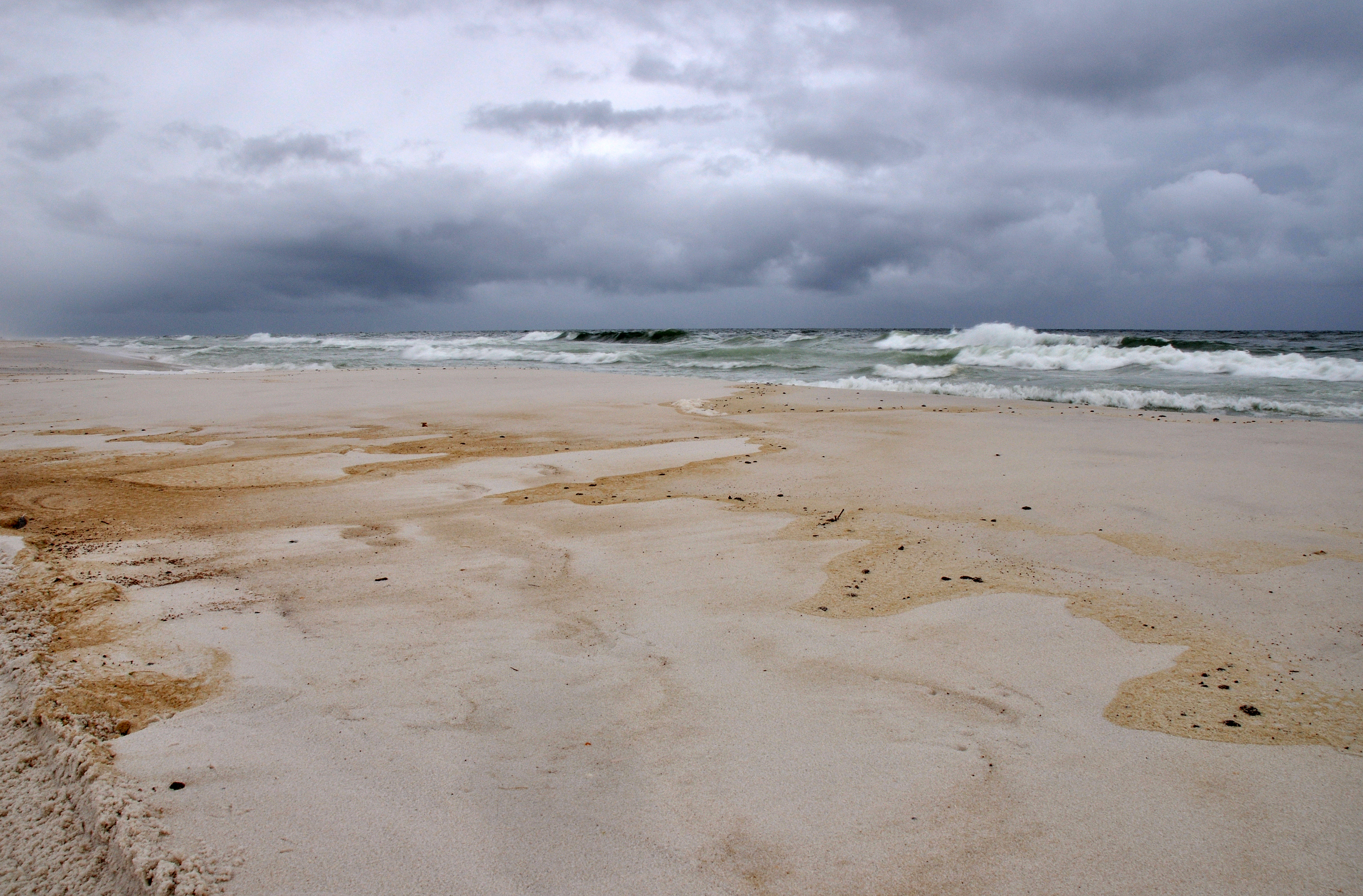
Oil-stained beaches in Pensacola, Florida; 1 July 2010

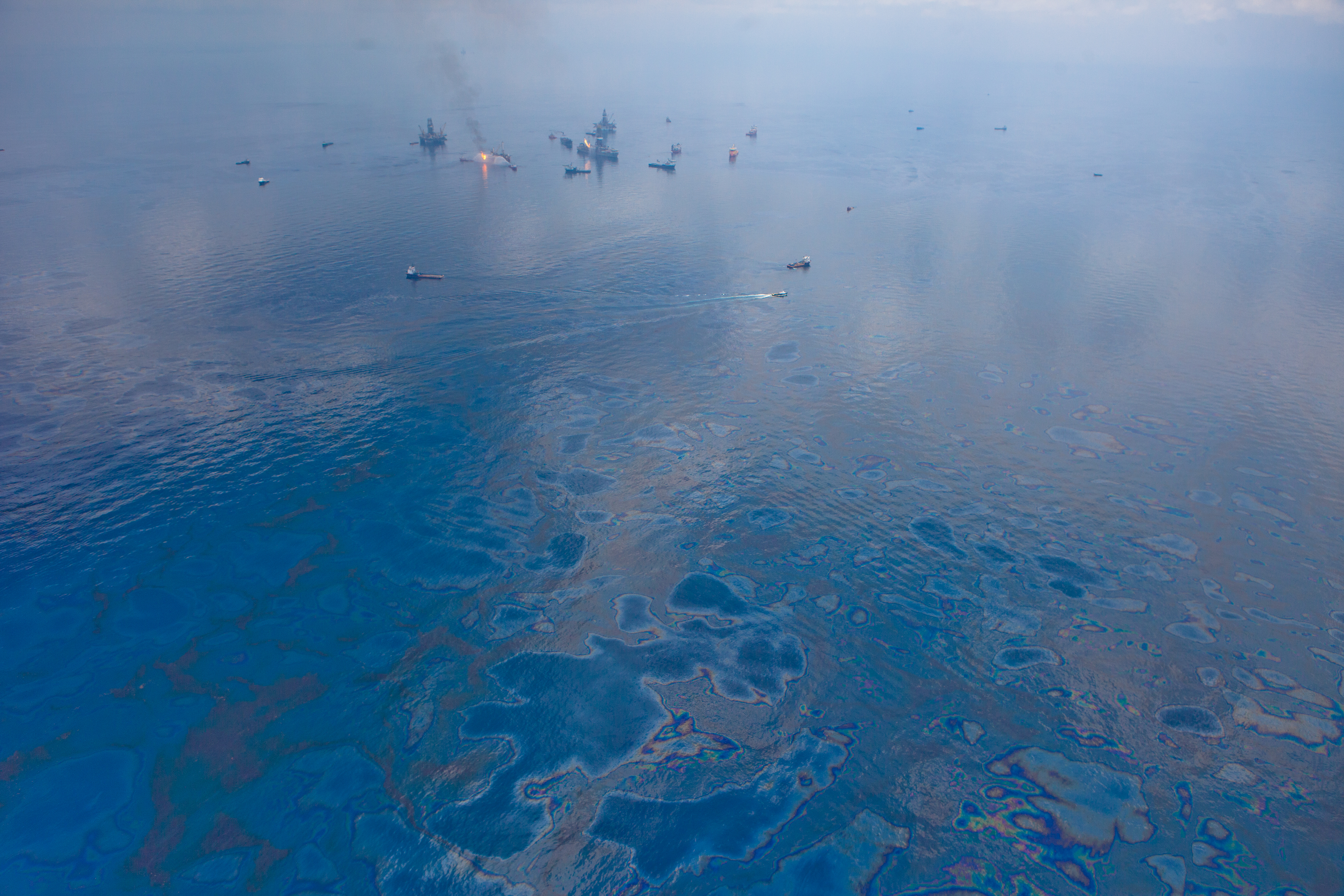
Burning and skimming operations in the Gulf of Mexico; 10 June 2010

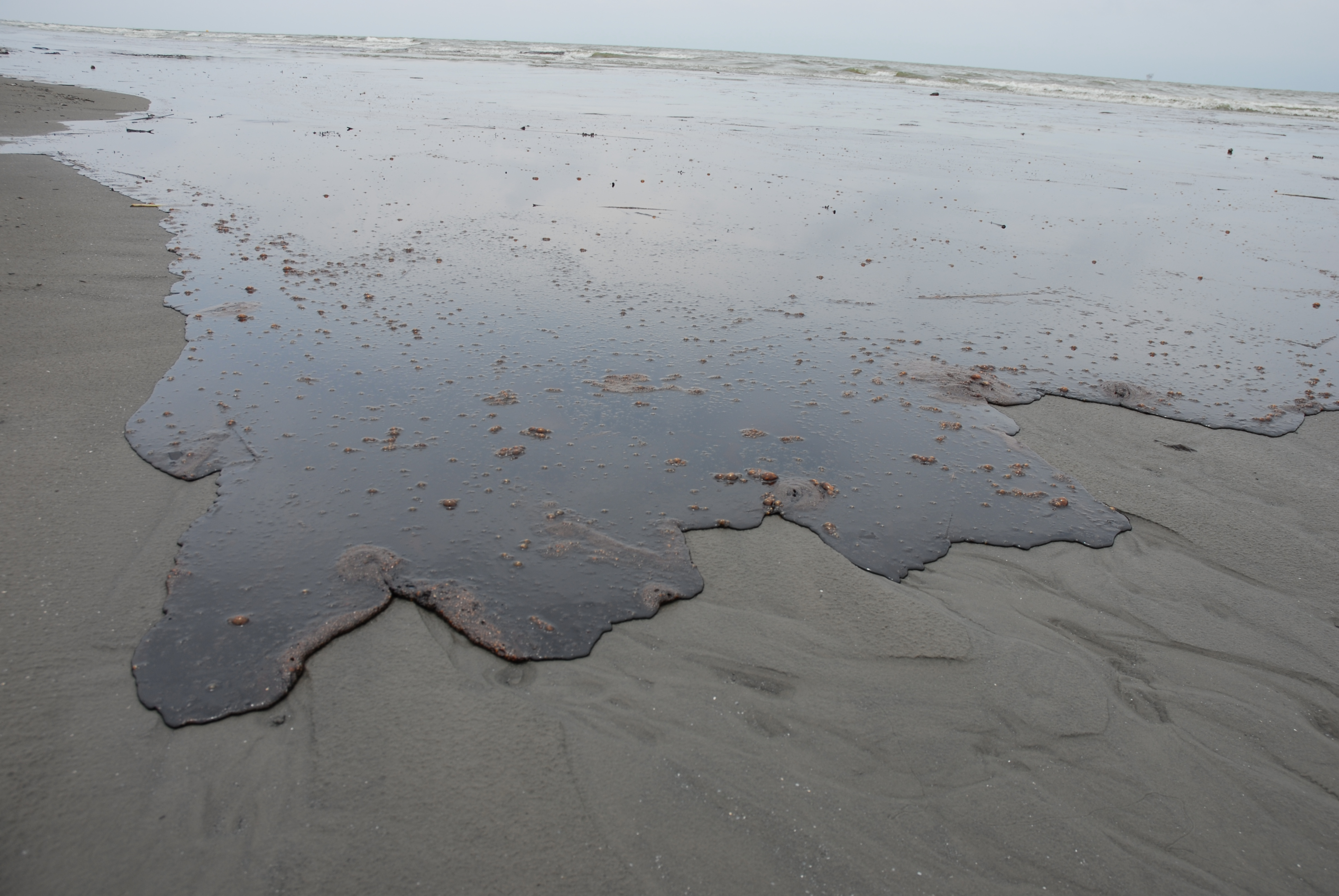
Thick oil washes ashore in Louisiana; 10 June 2010

The oil leak was discovered on the afternoon of 22 April 2010 when a large oil slick began to spread at the former rig site. The oil flowed for 87 days. BP originally estimated a flow rate of 1,000 to 5,000 barrels per day [bbl/d] (160 to 790 m^{3}/d). The Flow Rate Technical Group (FRTG) estimated the initial flow rate was 62,000 bbl/d (9,900 m^{3}/d). The total estimated volume of leaked oil approximated 4.9 million barrels (210,000,000 US gal; 780,000 m^{3}) with plus or minus 10% uncertainty, including oil that was collected, making it the world's largest accidental spill. BP challenged the higher figure, saying that the government overestimated the prefaced volume. Internal emails released in 2013 showed that one BP employee had estimates that matched those of the FRTG, and shared the data with supervisors, but BP continued with their lower number. The company argued that government figures do not reflect over 810,000 bbl (34 million US gal; 129,000 m^{3}) of oil that was collected or burned before it could enter the Gulf waters.

According to the satellite images, the spill directly affected 70,000 sq mi (180,000 km^{2}) of ocean, comparable to the area of Oklahoma. By early June 2010, oil had washed up on 125 mi (201 km) of Louisiana's coast and along the Mississippi, Florida, and Alabama coastlines. Oil sludge appeared in the Intracoastal Waterway and on Pensacola Beach and the Gulf Islands National Seashore. In late June, oil reached Gulf Park Estates, its first appearance in Mississippi. In July, tarballs reached Grand Isle and the shores of Lake Pontchartrain. In September a new wave of oil suddenly coated 16 mi (26 km) of Louisiana coastline and marshes west of the Mississippi River in Plaquemines Parish. In October, weathered oil reached Texas. As of July 2011, about 491 mi (790 km) of coastline in Louisiana, Mississippi, Alabama and Florida were contaminated by oil and a total of 1,074 mi (1,728 km) had been oiled since the spill began. As of December 2012, 339 mi (546 km) of coastline remain subject to evaluation and/or cleanup operations. The reported 3.19 million barrels of spilled oil was not the only effect of this disaster. A report detailed the release of thousands of tons of hydrocarbon gases (HC) into the atmosphere.

Concerns were raised about the appearance of underwater, horizontally-extended plumes of dissolved oil. Researchers concluded that deep plumes of dissolved oil and gas would likely remain confined to the northern Gulf of Mexico and that the peak impact on dissolved oxygen would be delayed and long-lasting. Two weeks after the wellhead was capped on 15 July 2010, the surface oil appeared to have dissipated, while an unknown amount of subsurface oil remained. Estimates of the residual ranged from a 2010 NOAA report that claimed about half of the oil remained below the surface to independent estimates of up to 75%.

That means over 100×10^{6} US gal (380 Ml) (2.4 million barrels) remained in the Gulf. As of January 2011, tar balls, oil sheen trails, fouled wetlands marsh grass and coastal sands were still evident. Subsurface oil remained offshore and in fine silts. In April 2012, oil was still found along as much as 200 mi (320 km) of Louisiana coastline and tar balls continued to wash up on the barrier islands. In 2013, some scientists at the Gulf of Mexico Oil Spill and Ecosystem Science Conference said that as much as one-third of the oil may have mixed with deep ocean sediments, where it risks damage to ecosystems and commercial fisheries.

In 2013, more than 4,600,000 lb (2,100 t) of "oiled material" was removed from the Louisiana coast. Although only "minute" quantities of oil continued to wash up in 2013, patches of tar balls were still being reported almost every day from Alabama and Florida Panhandle beaches. Regular cleanup patrols were no longer considered justified but cleanup was being conducted on an as-needed basis, in response to public reports.

It was first thought that oil had not reached as far as Tampa Bay, Florida; however, a study done in 2013 found that one of the plumes of dispersant-treated oil had reached a shelf 80 mi (130 km) off the Tampa Bay region. According to researchers, there is "some evidence it may have caused lesions in fish caught in that area".

== Efforts to stem the flow of oil ==
=== Short-term efforts ===
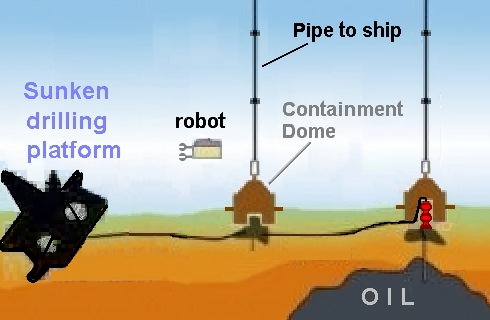
Concept diagram of underwater oil containment domes originally planned for the Deepwater Horizon oil spill. At this stage, there were 2 remaining oil leaks from the fallen pipeline.

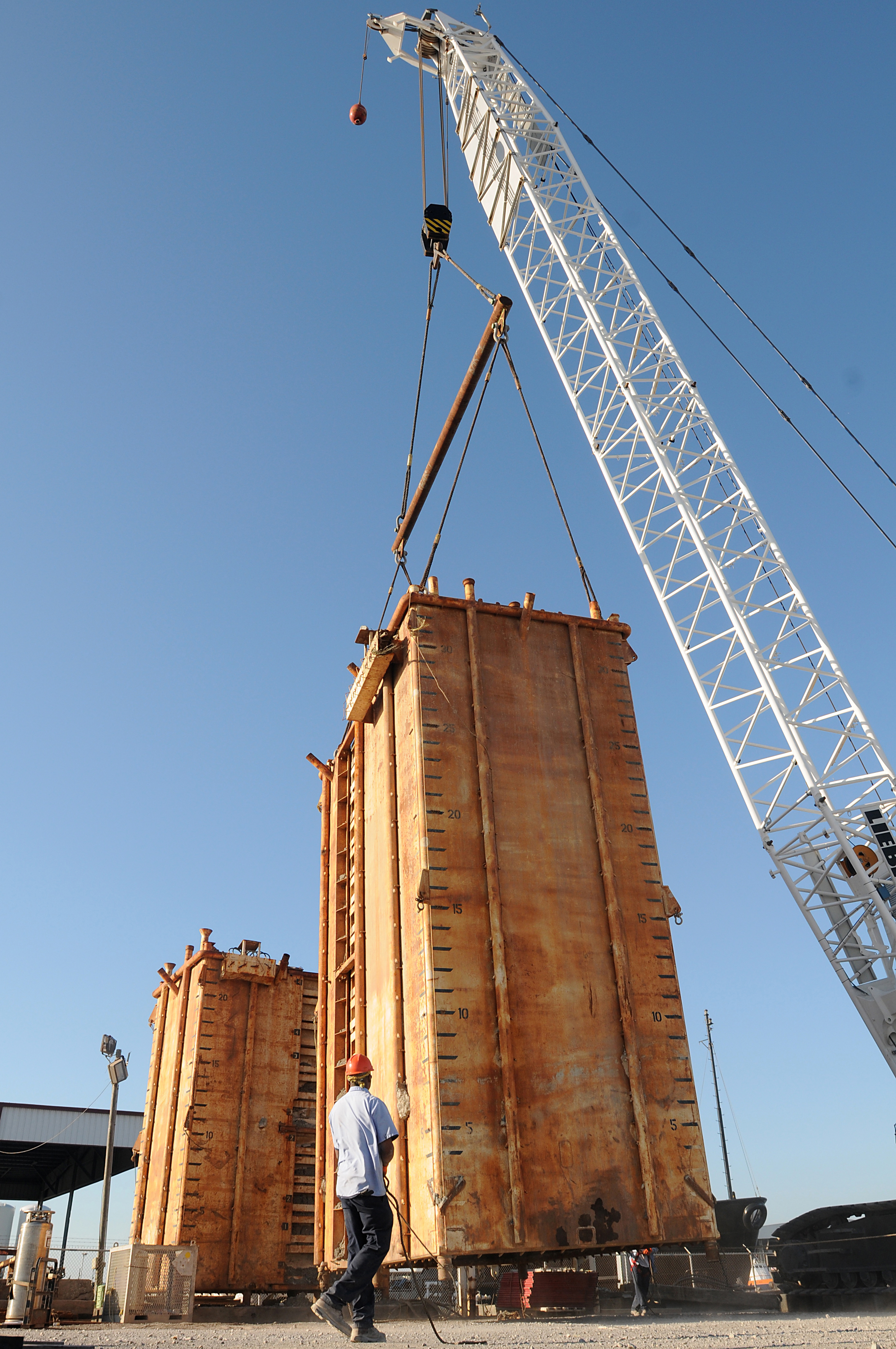
Oil containment dome under construction in Port Fourchon, Louisiana, at Wild Well Control on 26 April

First, BP unsuccessfully attempted to close the blowout preventer valves on the wellhead with remotely operated underwater vehicles. Next, it placed a 125-tonne (280,000 lb) containment dome over the largest leak and piped the oil to a storage vessel. While this technique had worked in shallower water, it failed here when gas combined with cold water to form methane hydrate crystals that blocked the opening at the top of the dome. Pumping heavy drilling fluids into the blowout preventer to restrict the flow of oil before sealing it permanently with cement ("top kill") also failed.

BP then inserted a riser insertion tube into the pipe and a stopper-like washer around the tube plugged at the end of the riser and diverted the flow into the insertion tube. The collected gas was flared and oil stored on board the drillship Discoverer Enterprise. Before the tube was removed, it collected 924,000 US gal (22,000 bbl; 3,500 m^{3}) of oil. On 3 June 2010, BP removed the damaged drilling riser from the top of the blowout preventer and covered the pipe by the cap which connected it to another riser. On 16 June, a second containment system connected directly to the blowout preventer began carrying oil and gas to service vessels, where it was consumed in a clean-burning system. The United States government's estimates suggested the cap and other equipment were capturing less than half of the leaking oil. On 10 July, the containment cap was removed to replace it with a better-fitting cap ("Top Hat Number 10"). Mud and cement were later pumped in through the top of the well to reduce the pressure inside it (which did not work either). A final device was created to attach a chamber of larger diameter than the flowing pipe with a flange that bolted to the top of the blowout preventer and a manual valve set to close off the flow once attached. On 15 July, the device was secured and time was taken closing the valves to ensure the attachment under increasing pressure until the valves were closed completing the temporary measures.

=== Well declared "effectively dead" ===
Transocean's Development Driller III started drilling a first relief well on 2 May 2010. GSF Development Driller II started drilling a second relief on 16 May 2010. On 3 August 2010, first test oil and then drilling mud was pumped at a slow rate of approximately 2 bbl (320 L) per minute into the well-head. Pumping continued for eight hours, at the end of which the well was declared to be "in a static condition." On 4 August 2010, BP began pumping cement from the top, sealing that part of the flow channel permanently.

On 3 September 2010, the 300-ton failed blowout preventer was removed from the well and a replacement blowout preventer was installed. On 16 September 2010, the relief well reached its destination and pumping of cement to seal the well began. On 19 September 2010, National Incident Commander Thad Allen declared the well "effectively dead" and said that it posed no further threat to the Gulf.

=== Recurrent or continued leakage ===
The Discoverer Enterprise and the Q4000 work around the clock burning undesirable gases from the still uncapped Deepwater Horizon well in the Gulf of Mexico. 26 June 2010

In May 2010, BP admitted they had "discovered things that were broken in the sub-surface" during the "top kill" effort.

Oil slicks were reported in March and August 2011, in March and October 2012, and in January 2013. Repeated scientific analyses confirmed that the sheen was a chemical match for oil from the Macondo well.

The USCG initially said the oil was too dispersed to recover and posed no threat to the coastline, but later warned BP and Transocean that they might be held financially responsible for cleaning up the new oil. USGS director Marcia McNutt stated that the riser pipe could hold at most 1,000 bbl (160 m^{3}) because it is open on both ends, making it unlikely to hold the amount of oil being observed.

In October 2012, BP reported that they had found and plugged leaking oil from the failed containment dome, now abandoned about 1,500 ft (460 m) from the main well. In December 2012, the USCG conducted a subsea survey; no oil coming from the wells or the wreckage was found and its source remains unknown. In addition, a white, milky substance was observed seeping from the wreckage. According to BP and the USCG, it is "not oil and it's not harmful."

In January 2013, BP said that they were continuing to investigate possible sources of the oil sheen. Chemical data implied that the substance might be residual oil leaking from the wreckage. If that proves to be the case, the sheen can be expected to eventually disappear. Another possibility is that it is formation oil escaping from the subsurface, using the Macondo well casing as flow conduit, possibly intersecting a naturally occurring fault, and then following that to escape at the surface some distance from the wellhead. If it proves to be oil from the subsurface, then that could indicate the possibility of an indefinite release of oil. The oil slick was comparable in size to naturally occurring oil seeps and was not large enough to pose an immediate threat to wildlife.

== Containment, collection and use of dispersants ==
The fundamental strategies for addressing the spill were containment, dispersal and removal. In summer 2010, approximately 47,000 people and 7,000 vessels were involved in the project. By 3 October 2012, federal response costs amounted to $850 million, mostly reimbursed by BP. As of January 2013, 935 personnel were still involved. By that time cleanup had cost BP over $14 billion.

It was estimated with plus-or-minus 10% uncertainty that 4.9 million barrels (780,000 m^{3}) of oil was released from the well; 4.1 million barrels (650,000 m^{3}) of oil went into the Gulf. The report led by the Department of the Interior and the NOAA said that "75% [of oil] has been cleaned up by Man or Mother Nature"; however, only about 25% of released oil was collected or removed while about 75% of oil remained in the environment in one form or another. In 2012, Markus Huettel, a benthic ecologist at Florida State University, maintained that while much of BP's oil was degraded or evaporated, at least 60% remains unaccounted for.

In May 2010, a local native set up a network for people to volunteer their assistance in cleaning up beaches. Boat captains were given the opportunity to offer the use of their boats to help clean and prevent the oil from further spreading. To assist with the efforts the captains had to register their ships with the Vessels of Opportunity; however, an issue arose when more boats registered than actually participated in the clean-up efforts – only a third of the registered boats. Many local supporters were disappointed with BP's slow response, prompting the formation of The Florida Key Environmental Coalition. This coalition gained significant influence in the clean-up of the oil spill to try to gain some control over the situation.

=== Containment ===
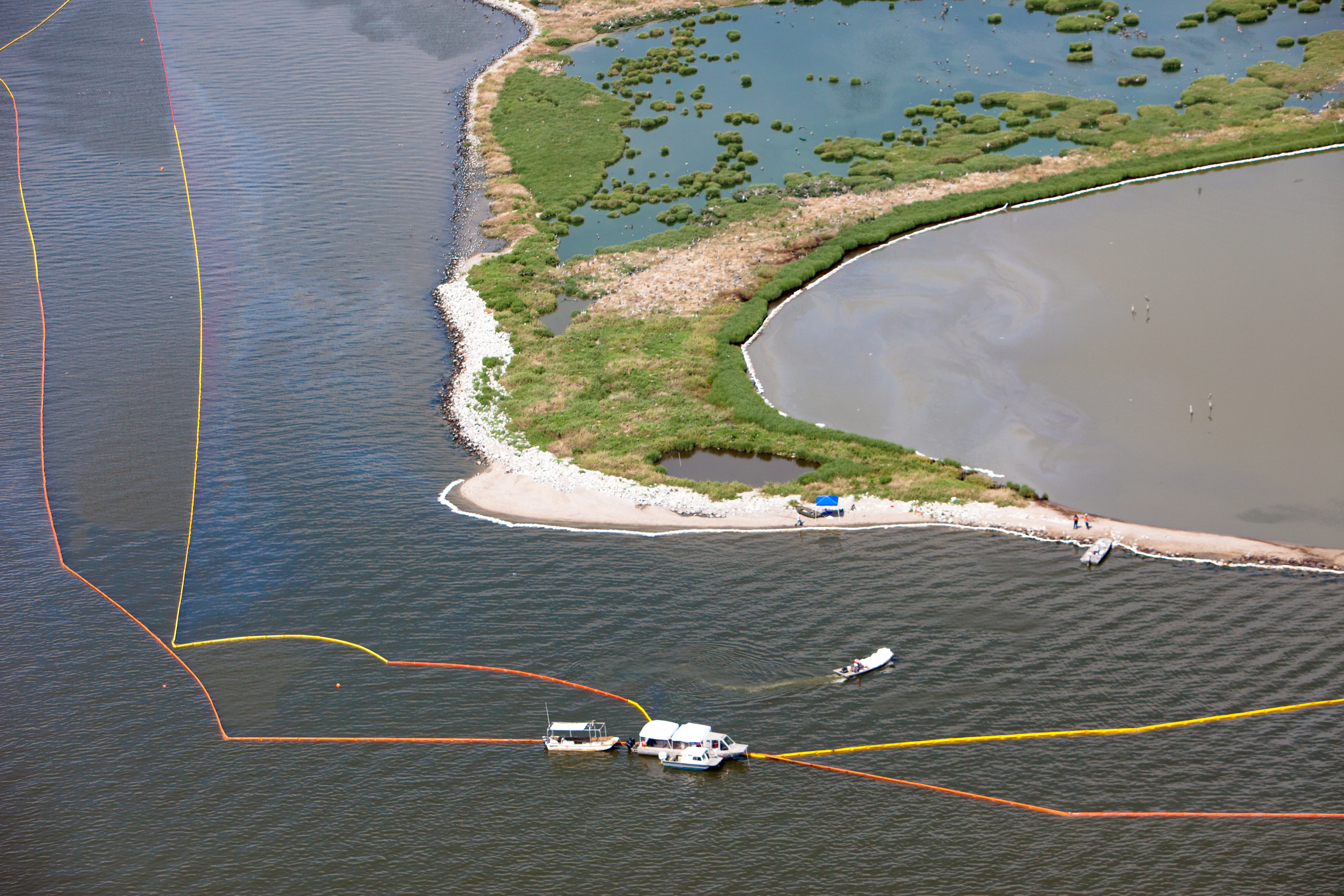
Oil containment boom used in an attempt to protect barrier islands

Containment booms stretching over 4,200,000 ft (1,300 km) were deployed, either to corral the oil or as barriers to protect marshes, mangroves, shrimp/crab/oyster ranches or other ecologically sensitive areas. Booms extend 18–48 in (0.46–1.22 m) above and below the water surface and were effective only in relatively calm and slow-moving waters. Including one-time use sorbent booms, a total of 13,300,000 ft (4,100 km) of booms were deployed. Booms were criticized for washing up on the shore with the oil, allowing oil to escape above or below the boom, and for ineffectiveness in more than three- to four-foot (90–120 cm) waves.

The Louisiana barrier island plan was developed to construct barrier islands to protect the coast of Louisiana. The plan was criticised for its expense and poor results. Critics allege that the decision to pursue the project was political with little scientific input. The EPA expressed concern that the booms would threaten wildlife.

For a time, a group called Matter of Trust, citing insufficient availability of manufactured oil absorption booms, campaigned to encourage hair salons, dog groomers and sheep farmers to donate hair, fur and wool clippings, stuffed in pantyhose or tights, to help contain oil near impacted shores, a technique dating back to the Exxon Valdez disaster.

=== Use of Corexit dispersant ===
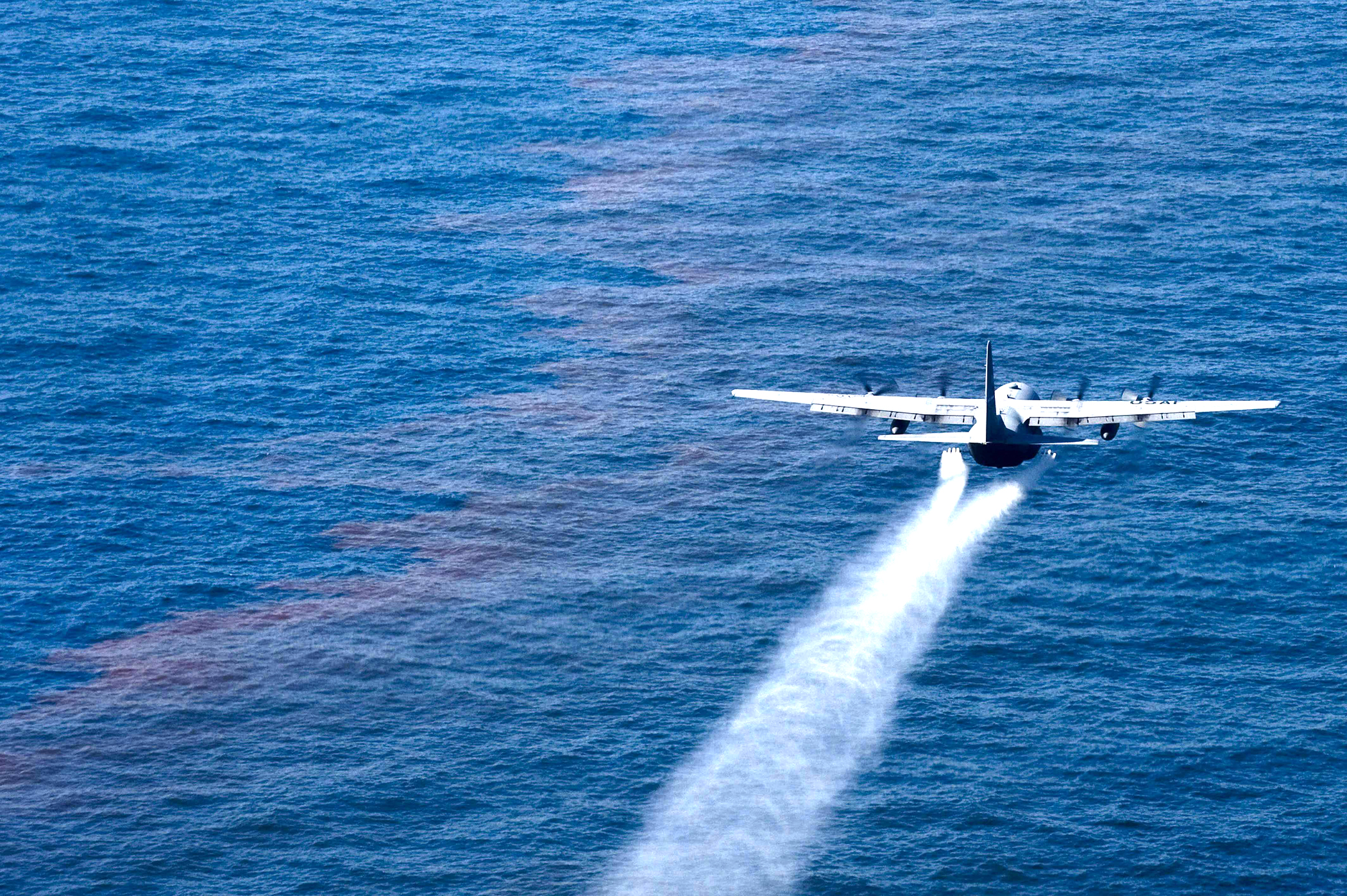
A C-130 Hercules sprays Corexit dispersant onto the Gulf of Mexico

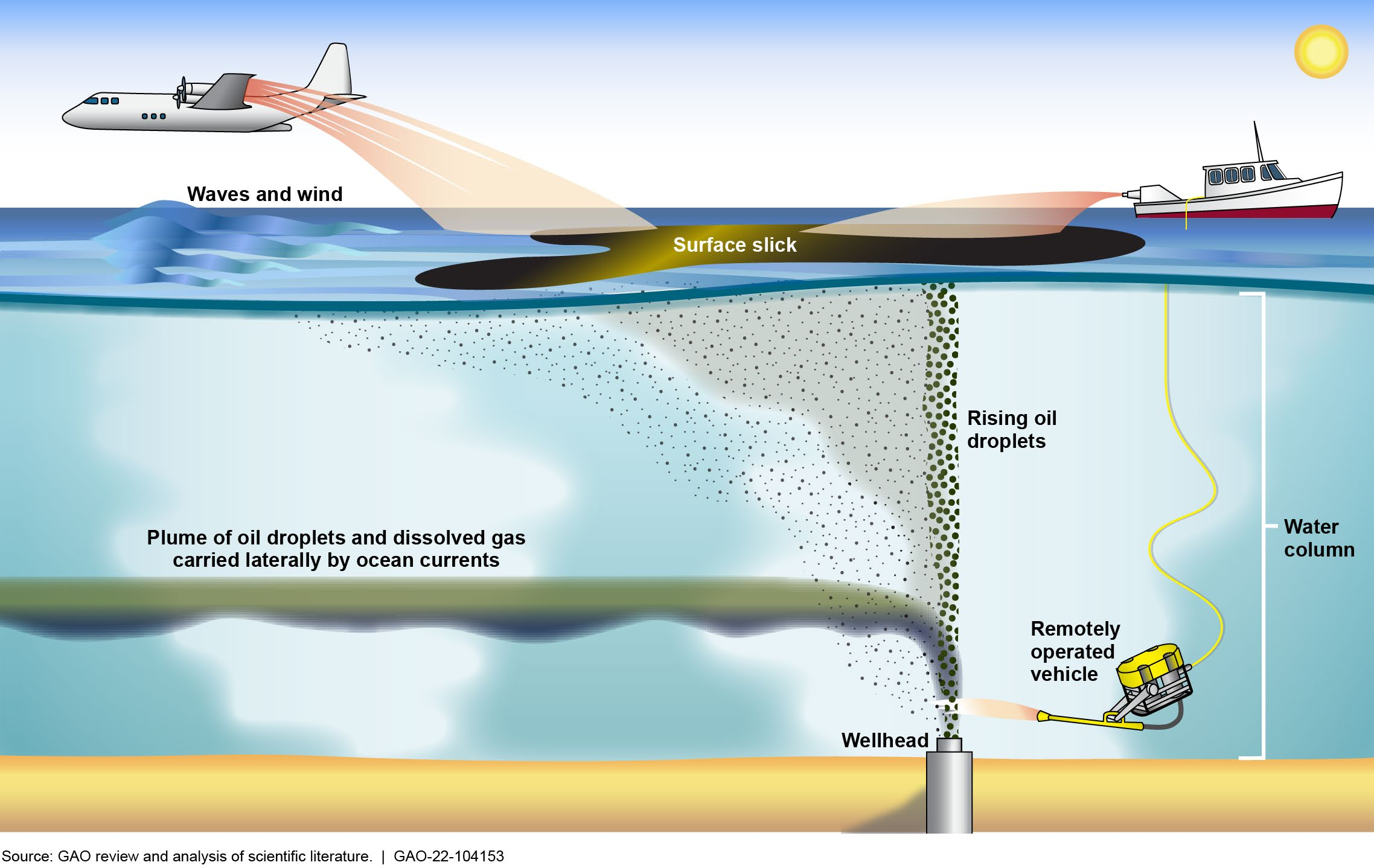
In addition to use of dispersants by boats and planes, the Deepwater Horizon spill was the first to use subsea dispersant injection

The spill was also notable for the volume of Corexit oil dispersant used and for application methods that were "purely experimental". Altogether, 1.84×10^{6} US gal (7,000 m^{3}) of dispersants were used; of this, 771,000 US gal (2,920 m^{3}) were released at the wellhead. Subsea injection had never previously been tried but, due to the spill's unprecedented nature, BP, together with USCG and EPA, decided to use it. Over 400 sorties were flown to release the product. Although usage of dispersants was described as "the most effective and fast moving tool for minimizing shoreline impact", the approach continues to be investigated.

A 2011 analysis conducted by Earthjustice and Toxipedia showed that the dispersant could contain cancer-causing agents, hazardous toxins and endocrine-disrupting chemicals. Environmental scientists expressed concerns that the dispersants add to the toxicity of a spill, increasing the threat to sea turtles and bluefin tuna. The dangers are even greater when poured into the source of a spill, because they are picked up by the current and wash through the Gulf. According to BP and federal officials, dispersant use stopped after the cap was in place; however, marine toxicologist Riki Ott wrote in an open letter to the EPA that Corexit use continued after that date and a GAP investigation stated that "[a] majority of GAP witnesses cited indications that Corexit was used after [July 2010]".

According to a NALCO manual obtained by GAP, Corexit 9527 is an "eye and skin irritant. Repeated or excessive exposure ... may cause injury to red blood cells (hemolysis), kidney or the liver". The manual adds: "Excessive exposure may cause central nervous system effects, nausea, vomiting, anesthetic or narcotic effects". It advises, "Do not get in eyes, on skin, on clothing", and "Wear suitable protective clothing". For Corexit 9500, the manual advised, "Do not get in eyes, on skin, on clothing", "Avoid breathing vapor", and "Wear suitable protective clothing". According to FOIA requests obtained by GAP, neither the protective gear nor the manual were distributed to Gulf oil spill cleanup workers.

Corexit EC9500A and Corexit EC9527A were the principal variants. The two formulations are neither the least toxic, nor the most effective, among EPA's approved dispersants, but BP said it chose to use Corexit because it was available the week of the rig explosion. On 19 May, the EPA gave BP 24 hours to choose less toxic alternatives to Corexit from the National Contingency Plan Product Schedule and begin applying them within 72 hours of EPA approval or provide a detailed reasoning why no approved products met the standards. On 20 May, BP determined that none of the alternative products met all three criteria of availability, non-toxicity and effectiveness. On 24 May, EPA Administrator Lisa P. Jackson ordered EPA to conduct its own evaluation of alternatives and ordered BP to reduce dispersant use by 75%. BP reduced Corexit use by 25,689 to 23,250 US gal (97,240 to 88,010 L) per day, a 9% decline. On 2 August 2010, the EPA said dispersants did no more harm to the environment than the oil and that they stopped a large amount of oil from reaching the coast by breaking it down faster. However, some independent scientists and EPA's own experts continue to voice concerns about the approach.

Underwater injection of Corexit into the leak may have created the oil plumes which were discovered below the surface. Because the dispersants were applied at depth, much of the oil never rose to the surface. One plume was 22 mi (35 km) long, more than 1 mi (1,600 m) wide and 650 ft (200 m) deep. In a major study on the plume, experts were most concerned about the slow pace at which the oil was breaking down in the cold, 40 °F (4 °C) water at depths of 3,000 ft (900 m).

In late 2012, a study from Georgia Tech and Universidad Autonoma de Aguascalientes in Environmental Pollution journal reported that Corexit used during the BP oil spill had increased the toxicity of the oil by 52 times. The scientists concluded that "Mixing oil with dispersant increased toxicity to ecosystems" and made the gulf oil spill worse.

=== Removal ===
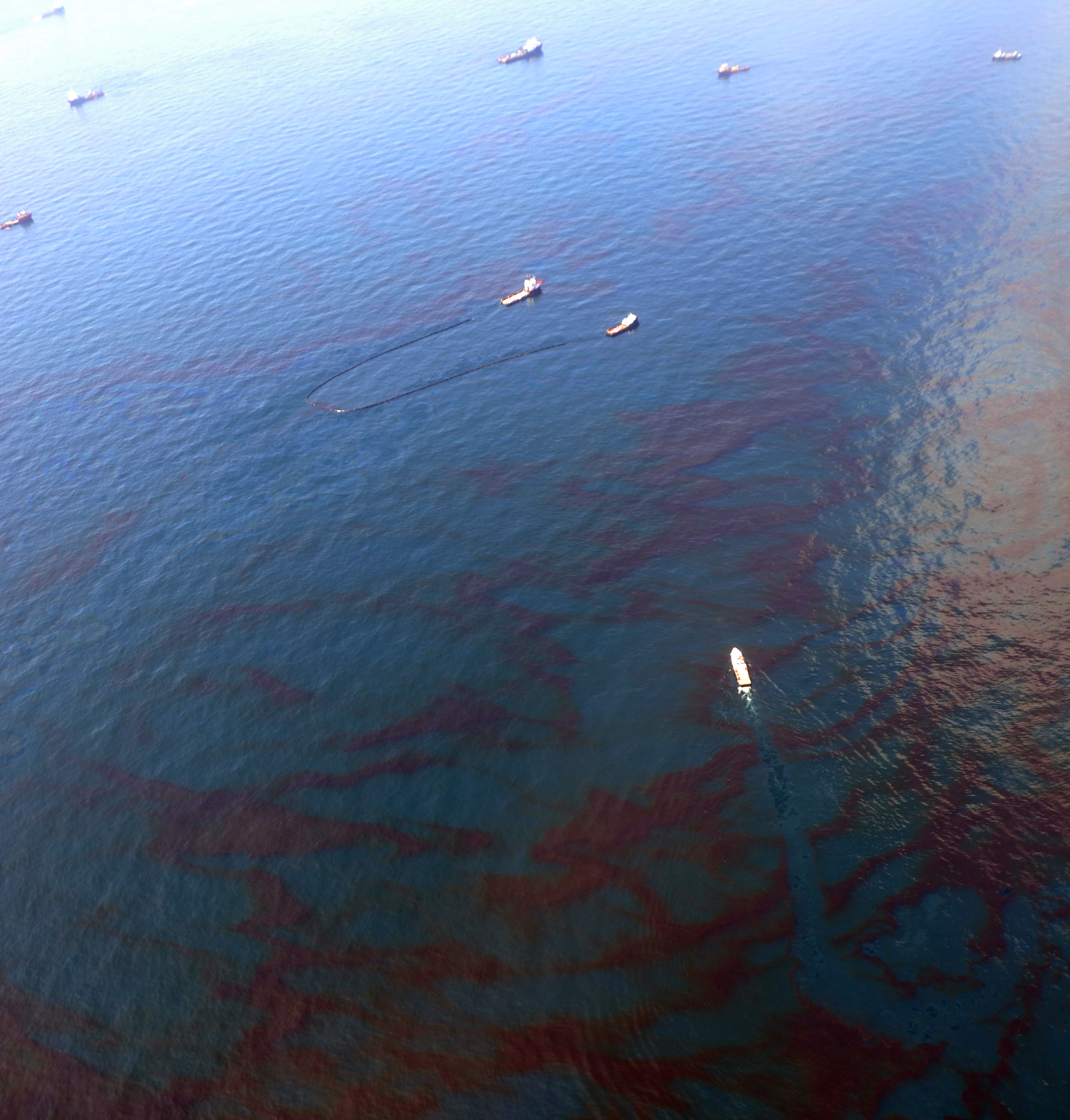
Oil skimming vessels (distance) in the Gulf of Mexico

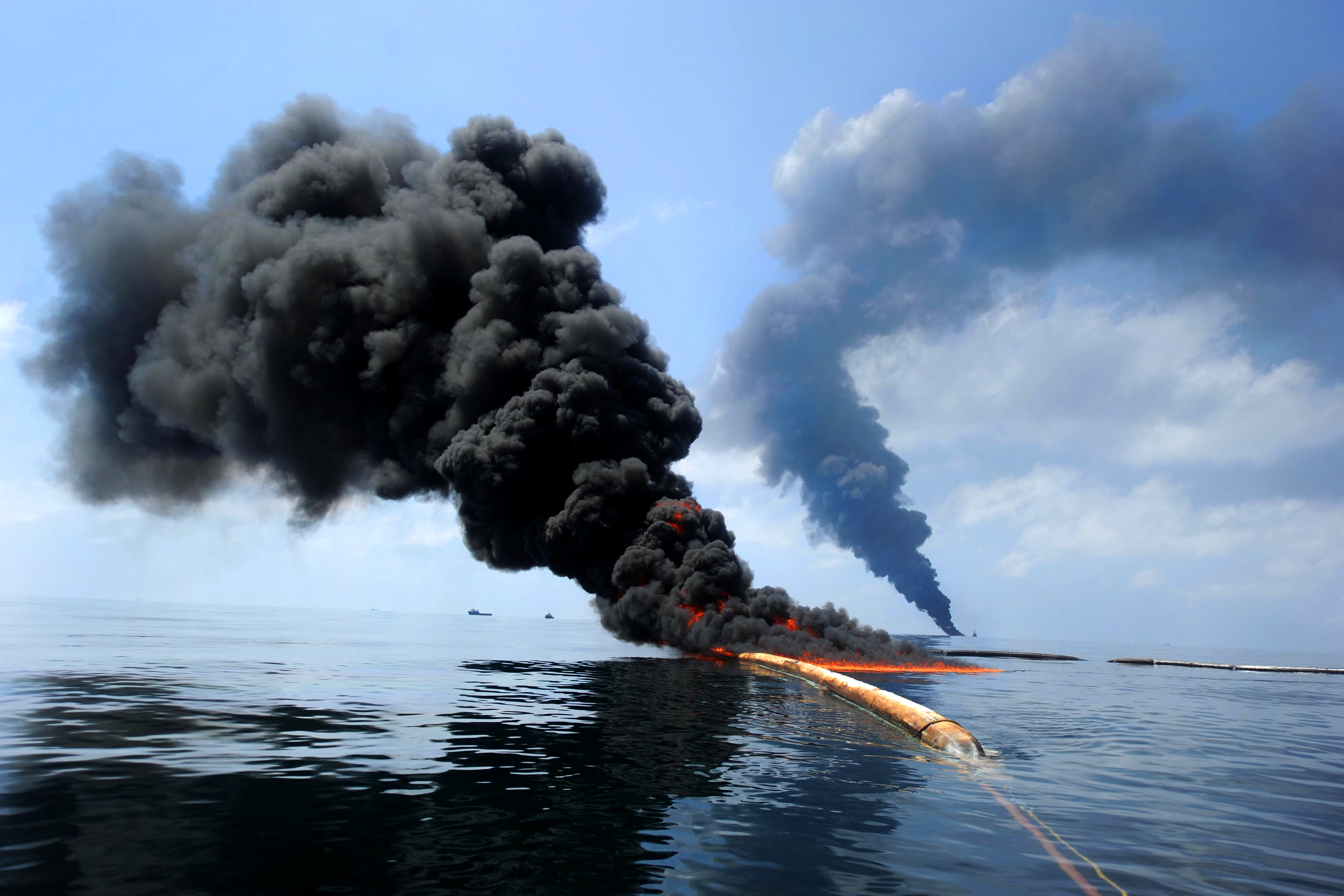
Dark clouds of smoke and fire emerge as oil burns during a controlled fire in the Gulf of Mexico, 6 May 2010

The three basic approaches for removing the oil from the water were: combustion, offshore filtration, and collection for later processing. USCG said 33,000,000 US gal (120,000 m^{3}) of tainted water was recovered, including 5,000,000 US gal (19,000 m^{3}) of oil. BP said 826,800 bbl (131,450 m^{3}) had been recovered or flared. It is calculated that about 5% of leaked oil was burned at the surface and 3% was skimmed. On the most demanding day, 47,849 people were assigned on the response works and over 6,000 Marine vessels, 82 helicopters, and 20 fixed-wing aircraft were involved.

From April to mid-July 2010, 411 controlled in-situ fires remediated approximately 265,000 bbl (11.1 million US gal; 42,100 m^{3}). The fires released small amounts of toxins, including cancer-causing dioxins. According to EPA's report, the released amount is not enough to pose an added cancer risk to workers and coastal residents, while a second research team concluded that there was only a small added risk.

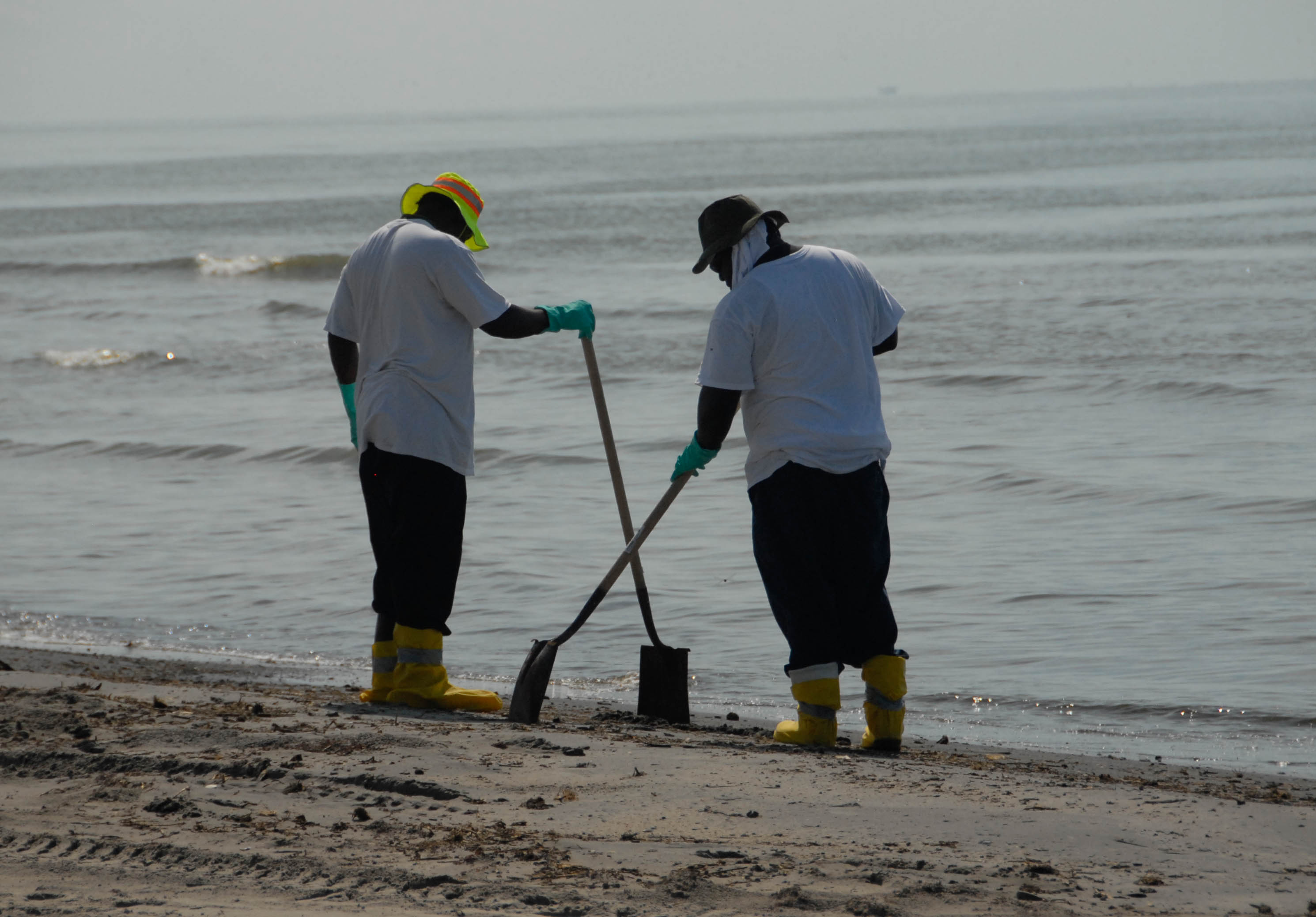
Workers cleaning a beach affected by the spill.

Oil was collected from water by using skimmers. In total, 2,063 various skimmers were used. For offshore, more than 60 open-water skimmers were deployed, including 12 purpose-built vehicles. EPA regulations prohibited skimmers that left more than 15 parts per million (ppm) of oil in the water. Many large-scale skimmers exceeded the limit. Due to use of Corexit, the oil was too dispersed to collect, according to a spokesperson for shipowner TMT. In mid-June 2010, BP ordered 32 machines that separate oil and water, with each machine capable of extracting up to 2,000 bbl/d (320 m^{3}/d). After one week of testing, BP began to proceed and, by 28 June, had removed 890,000 bbl (141,000 m^{3}).

After the well was capped, the cleanup of shore became the main task of the response workers. Two main types of affected coast were sandy beaches and marshes. On beaches, the main techniques were sifting sand, removing tar balls, and digging out tar mats manually or by using mechanical devices. For marshes, techniques such as vacuum and pumping, low-pressure flush, vegetation cutting, and bioremediation were used.

=== Oil-eating microbes ===
Dispersants are said to facilitate the digestion of the oil by microbes but conflicting results have been reported on this in the context of the Deepwater Horizon oil spill. Mixing dispersants with oil at the wellhead would keep some oil below the surface and, in theory, allow microbes to digest the oil before it reached the surface. Various risks were identified and evaluated, in particular, that an increase in microbial activity might reduce subsea oxygen levels, threatening fish and other animals.

Several studies suggest that microbes successfully consumed part of the oil. By mid-September, other research claimed that microbes mainly digested natural gas rather than oil. David L. Valentine, a professor of microbial geochemistry at UC Santa Barbara, said that the capability of microbes to break down the leaked oil had been greatly exaggerated. However, biogeochemist Chris Reddy said natural microorganisms are a big reason why the oil spill in the Gulf of Mexico was not far worse.

Genetically modified Alcanivorax borkumensis was added to the waters to speed digestion. The delivery method of microbes to oil patches was proposed by the Russian Research and Development Institute of Ecology and the Sustainable Use of Natural Resources.

== Access restrictions ==
On 18 May 2010, BP was designated the lead "Responsible Party" under the Oil Pollution Act of 1990, which meant that BP had operational authority in coordinating the response.

The first video images were released on 12 May, and further video images were released by members of Congress who had been given access to them by BP.

During the spill response operations, at the request of the Coast Guard, the Federal Aviation Administration (FAA) implemented a 900 sq mi (2,300 km^{2}) temporary flight restriction zone over the operations area. Restrictions were to prevent civilian air traffic from interfering with aircraft assisting the response effort. All flights in the operations' area were prohibited except flight authorized by air traffic control; routine flights supporting offshore oil operations; federal, state, local and military flight operations supporting spill response; and air ambulance and law enforcement operations. Exceptions for these restrictions were granted on a case-by-case basis dependent on safety issues, operational requirements, weather conditions, and traffic volume. No flights, except aircraft conducting aerial chemical dispersing operations, or for landing and takeoff, were allowed below 1,000 m (3,300 ft). Notwithstanding restrictions, there were 800 to 1,000 flights per day during the operations.

Local and federal authorities citing BP's authority denied access to members of the press attempting to document the spill from the air, from boats, and on the ground, blocking access to areas that were open to the public. In some cases photographers were granted access only with BP officials escorting them on BP-contracted boats and aircraft. In one example, the U.S. Coast Guard stopped Jean-Michel Cousteau's boat and allowed it to proceed only after the Coast Guard was assured that no journalists were on board. In another example, a CBS News crew was denied access to the oil-covered beaches of the spill area. The CBS crew was told by the authorities, "This is BP's rules, not ours," when trying to film the area. Some members of Congress criticized the restrictions placed on access by journalists.

The FAA denied that BP employees or contractors made decisions on flights and access, saying those decisions were made by the FAA and Coast Guard. The FAA acknowledged that media access was limited to hired planes or helicopters, but was arranged through the Coast Guard. The Coast Guard and BP denied having a policy of restricting journalists; they noted that members of the media had been embedded with the authorities and allowed to cover response efforts since the beginning of the effort, with more than 400 embeds aboard boats and aircraft to date. They also said that they wanted to provide access to the information while maintaining safety.

== Cleanup ==
On 15 April 2014, BP announced that cleanup along the coast was substantially complete, while the United States Coast Guard work continued using physical barriers such as floating booms, the cleanup workers' objective was to keep the oil from spreading any further. They used skimmer boats to remove a majority of the oil and they used sorbents to absorb any remnant of oil like a sponge. Although that method did not remove the oil completely, chemicals called dispersants were used to hasten the oil's degradation to prevent the oil from doing further damage to the marine habitats below the surface water. For the Deep Horizon oil spill, cleanup workers used 1,400,000 US gal (5,300,000 L; 1,200,000 imp gal) of various chemical dispersants to further breakdown the oil.

The state of Louisiana received funding by BP to do regular testing of fish, shellfish, water, and sand. Initial testing regularly showed detectable levels of dioctyl sodium sulfosuccinate, a chemical used in the clean up. Testing over 2019 reported by GulfSource.org, for the pollutants tested have not produced results.

Due to the Deepwater Horizon spill, marine life was suffering. Thousands of animals were visibly covered in oil. The U.S. Fish and Wildlife Service, working with the Smithsonian's National Zoological Park, rescued animals to help with the spill cleanup, although there were many animals found dead.

== Consequences ==
=== Environmental impact ===
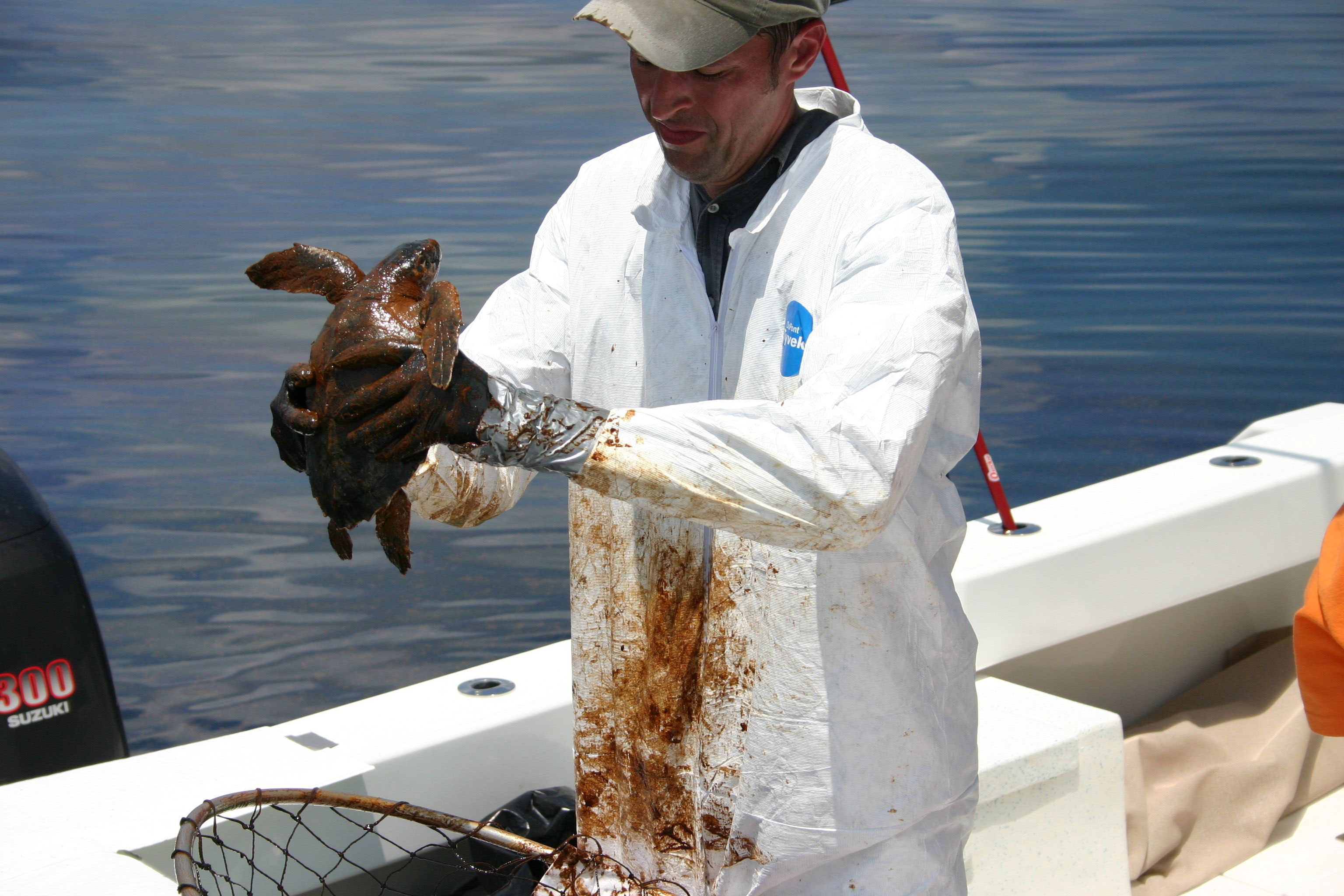
Capturing heavily oiled young turtles 20 to 40 miles (32 to 64 km) offshore for rehabilitation; 14 June 2010

The spill area hosts 8,332 species, including more than 1,270 fish, 604 polychaetes, 218 birds, 1,456 mollusks, 1,503 crustaceans, 4 sea turtles and 29 marine mammals. Between May and June 2010, the spill waters contained 40 times more polycyclic aromatic hydrocarbons (PAHs) than before the spill. PAHs are often linked to oil spills and include carcinogens and chemicals that pose various health risks to humans and marine life. The PAHs were most concentrated near the Louisiana Coast, but levels also jumped 2–3 fold in areas off Alabama, Mississippi and Florida. PAHs can harm marine species directly and microbes used to consume the oil can reduce marine oxygen levels. The oil contained approximately 40% methane by weight, compared to about 5% found in typical oil deposits. Methane can potentially suffocate marine life and create "dead zones" where oxygen is depleted.

The National Oceanic and Atmospheric Administration (NOAA) natural resource damage assessment concluded that the spill caused extensive ecological injuries across Gulf of Mexico ecosystems. It estimated that marsh vegetation was reduced along 350 to 720 miles of shoreline, while between 4 and 8.3 billion harvestable oysters were lost. The assessment also reported that between 51,000 and 84,000 birds, 56,000 to 166,000 juvenile sea turtles, and an estimated 2 to 5 trillion newly hatched fish were killed, alongside up to a 51% decline in the Barataria Bay dolphin population. Rare deep-sea corals and red crab communities were affected across roughly 400 to 700 square miles near the wellhead, and recreational losses from reduced boating, fishing, and beachgoing were estimated at $527 million to $859 million.

A 2014 study of the effects of the oil spill on bluefin tuna funded by National Oceanic and Atmospheric Administration (NOAA), Stanford University, and the Monterey Bay Aquarium and published in the journal Science, found that the toxins from oil spills can cause irregular heartbeats leading to cardiac arrest. Calling the vicinity of the spill "one of the most productive ocean ecosystems in the world", the study found that even at very low concentrations "PAH cardiotoxicity was potentially a common form of injury among a broad range of species in the vicinity of the oil." Another peer-reviewed study, released in March 2014 and conducted by 17 scientists from the United States and Australia and published in the Proceedings of the National Academy of Sciences, found that tuna and amberjack that were exposed to oil from the spill developed deformities of the heart and other organs that would be expected to be fatal or at least life-shortening. The scientists said that their findings would most likely apply to other large predator fish and "even to humans, whose developing hearts are in many ways similar." BP responded that the concentrations of oil in the study were a level rarely seen in the Gulf, but The New York Times reported that the BP statement was contradicted by the study.

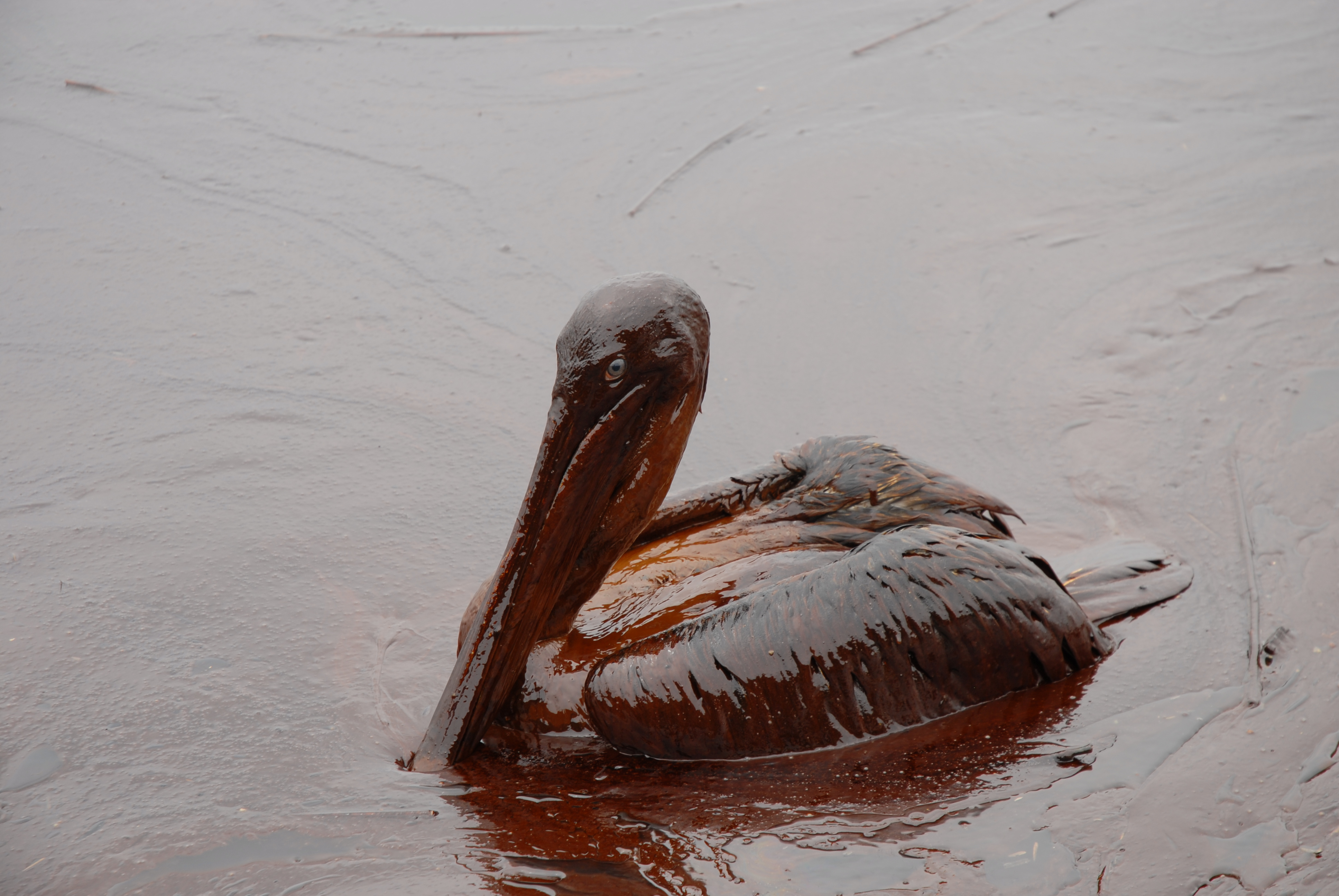
An oiled brown pelican near Grand Isle, Louisiana

The oil dispersant Corexit, previously only used as a surface application, was released underwater in unprecedented amounts, with the intent of making it more easily biodegraded by naturally occurring microbes. Thus, oil that would normally rise to the surface of the water was emulsified into tiny droplets and remained suspended in the water and on the sea floor. The oil and dispersant mixture permeated the food chain through zooplankton. Signs of an oil-and-dispersant mix were found under the shells of tiny blue crab larvae. A study of insect populations in the coastal marshes affected by the spill also found a significant impact. Chemicals from the spill were found in migratory birds as far away as Minnesota. Pelican eggs contained "petroleum compounds and Corexit". Dispersant and PAHs from oil are believed to have caused "disturbing numbers" of mutated fish that scientists and commercial fishers saw in 2012, including 50% of shrimp found lacking eyes and eye sockets. Fish with oozing sores and lesions were first noted by fishermen in November 2010. Prior to the spill, approximately 0.1% of Gulf fish had lesions or sores. A report from the University of Florida said that many locations showed 20% of fish with lesions, while later estimates reached 50%. In October 2013, Al Jazeera reported that the gulf ecosystem was "in crisis", citing a decline in seafood catches, as well as deformities and lesions found in fish. According to J. Christopher Haney, Harold Geiger, and Jeffrey Short, three researchers with extensive experience in environmental monitoring and post-spill mortality assessments, over one million coastal birds died as a direct result of the Deepwater Horizon spill. These numbers, coupled with the National Audubon Society scientists' observations of bird colonies and bird mortality well after the acute phase, have led scientists to conclude that more than one million birds ultimately succumbed to the lethal effects of the Gulf oil spill.

In July 2010, it was reported that the spill was "already having a 'devastating' effect on marine life in the Gulf". Damage to the ocean floor especially endangered the Louisiana pancake batfish whose range is entirely contained within the spill-affected area. In March 2012, a definitive link was found between the death of a Gulf coral community and the spill. According to NOAA, a cetacean Unusual Mortality Event (UME) has been recognized since before the spill began, NOAA is investigating possible contributing factors to the ongoing UME from the Deepwater Horizon spill, with the possibility of eventual criminal charges being filed if the spill is shown to be connected. Some estimates are that only 2% of the carcasses of killed mammals have been recovered.

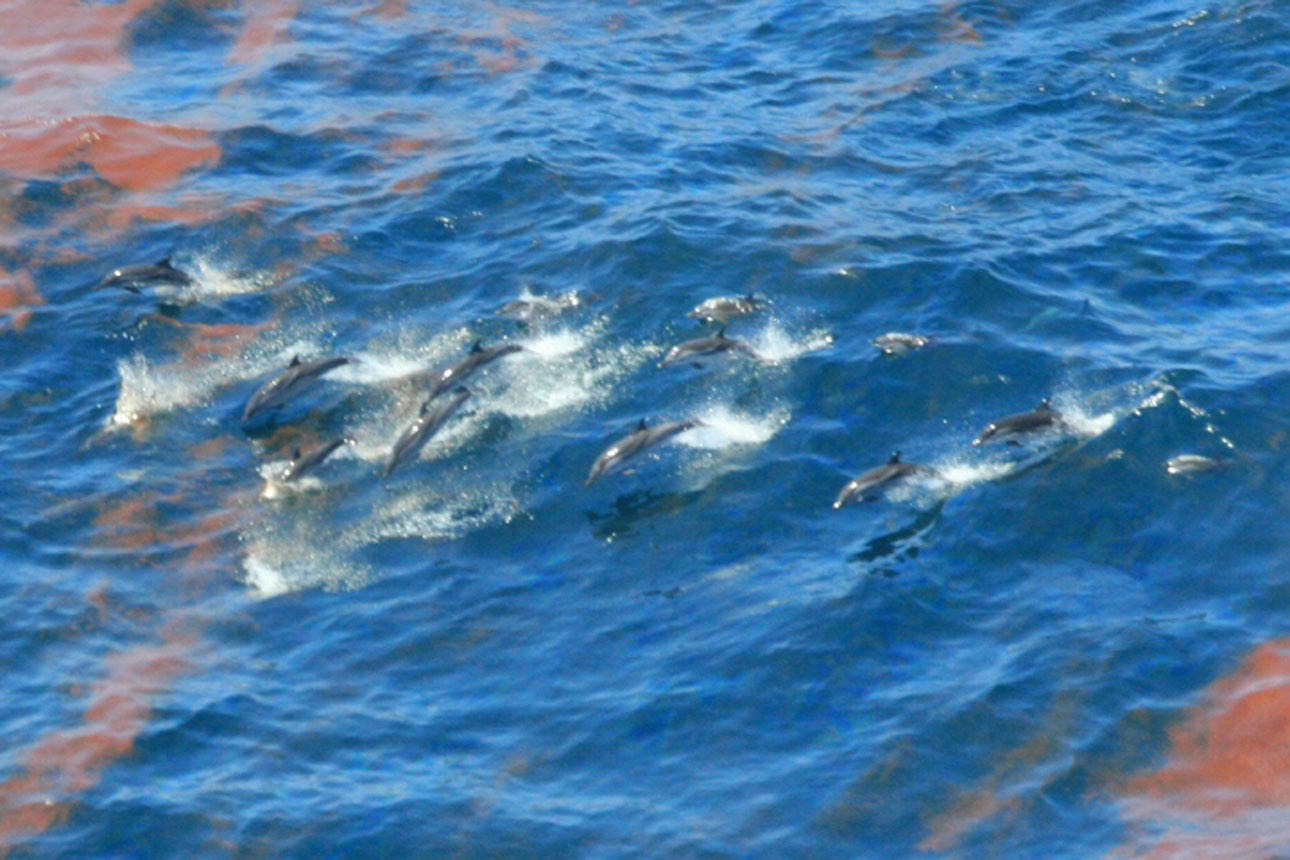
Striped dolphins (Stenella coeruleoalba) observed in emulsified oil on 29 April 2010

In the first birthing season for dolphins after the spill, dead baby dolphins washed up along Mississippi and Alabama shorelines at about 10 times the normal number. A peer-reviewed NOAA/BP study disclosed that nearly half the bottlenose dolphins tested in mid-2011 in Barataria Bay, a heavily oiled area, were in "guarded or worse" condition, "including 17 percent that were not expected to survive". BP officials deny that the disease conditions are related to the spill, saying that dolphin deaths actually began being reported before the BP oil spill. By 2013, over 650 dolphins had been found stranded in the oil spill area, a four-fold increase over the historical average. The National Wildlife Federation (NWF) reports that sea turtles, mostly endangered Kemp's ridley sea turtles, have been stranding at a high rate. Before the spill there was an average of 100 strandings per year; since the spill the number has jumped to roughly 500. NWF senior scientist Doug Inkley notes that the marine death rates are unprecedented and occurring high in the food chain, strongly suggesting there is "something amiss with the Gulf ecosystem". In December 2013, the journal Environmental Science & Technology published a study finding that of 32 dolphins briefly captured from 24-km stretch near southeastern Louisiana, half were seriously ill or dying. BP said the report was "inconclusive as to any causation associated with the spill".

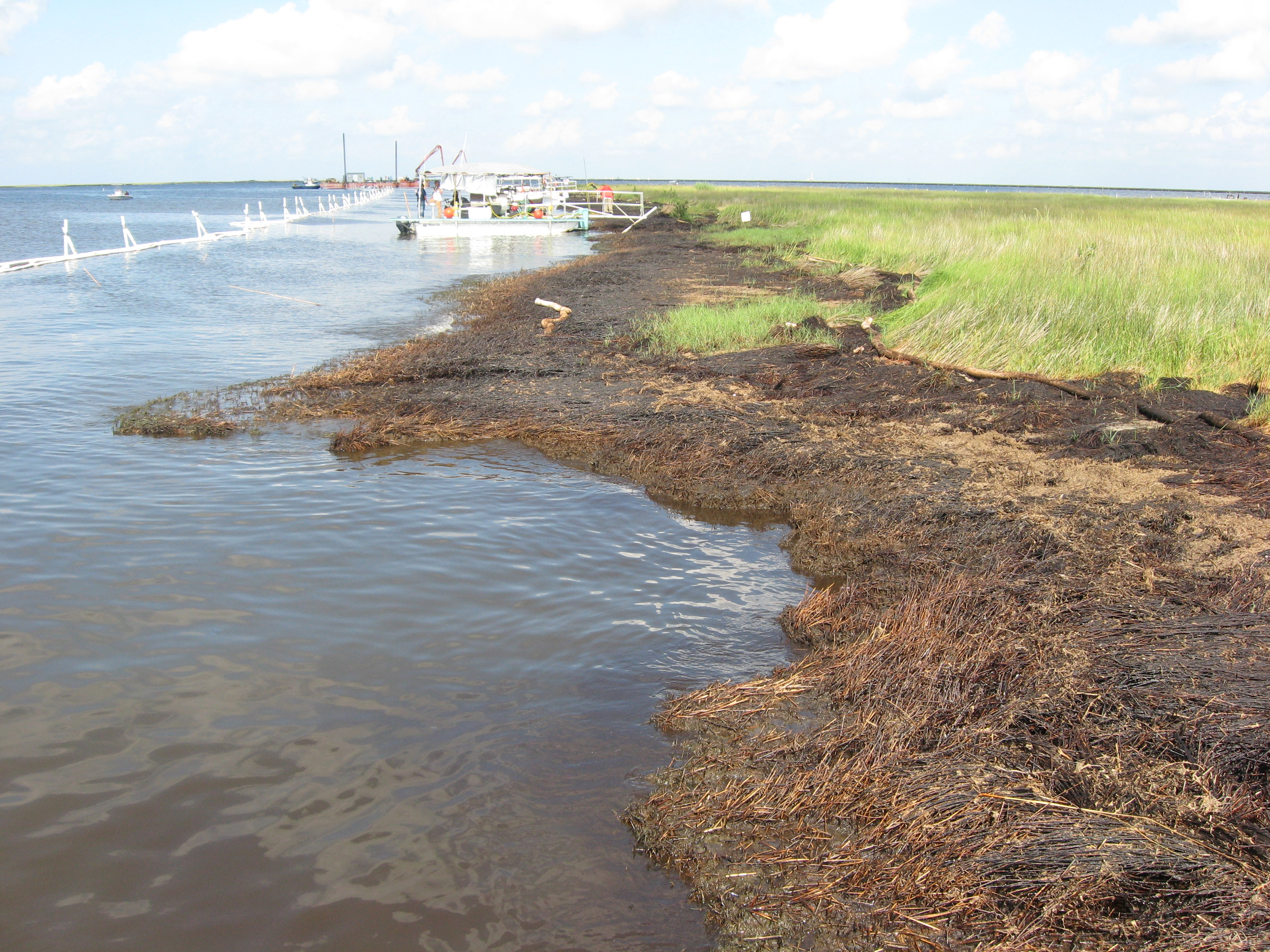
Heavy oiling of Bay Jimmy, Plaquemines Parish; 15 September 2010

In 2012, tar balls continued to wash up along the Gulf coast and in 2013, tar balls could still be found in on the Mississippi and Louisiana coasts, along with oil sheens in marshes and signs of severe erosion of coastal islands, brought about by the death of trees and marsh grass from exposure to the oil. In 2013, former NASA physicist Bonny Schumaker noted a "dearth of marine life" in a radius 30 to 50 mi (48 to 80 km) around the well, after flying over the area numerous times since May 2010.

In 2013, researchers found that oil on the bottom of the seafloor did not seem to be degrading, and observed a phenomenon called a "dirty blizzard": oil in the water column began clumping around suspended sediments, and falling to the ocean floor in an "underwater rain of oily particles". The result could have long-term effects because oil could remain in the food chain for generations.

A 2014 bluefin tuna study in Science found that oil already broken down by wave action and chemical dispersants was more toxic than fresh oil. A 2015 study of the relative toxicity of oil and dispersants to coral also found that the dispersants were more toxic than the oil.

A 2015 study by the National Oceanic and Atmospheric Administration, published in PLOS ONE, links the sharp increase in dolphin deaths to the Deepwater Horizon oil spill.

On 12 April 2016, a research team reported that 88 percent of about 360 baby or stillborn dolphins within the spill area "had abnormal or under-developed lungs", compared to 15 percent in other areas. The study was published in the April 2016 Diseases of Aquatic Organisms.

A 13-year survey published in PNAS in 2026 demonstrated that deep sea animals including fish, crustaceans, and cephalopods experienced some of the sharpest and most sustained population declines from the spill. Fish populations were the hardest hit, dropping by 64%.

=== Health consequences ===
By June 2010, 143 spill-exposure cases had been reported to the Louisiana Department of Health and Hospitals; 108 of those involved workers in the clean-up efforts, while 35 were reported by residents. Chemicals from the oil and dispersant are believed to be the cause; it is believed that the addition of dispersants made the oil more toxic.

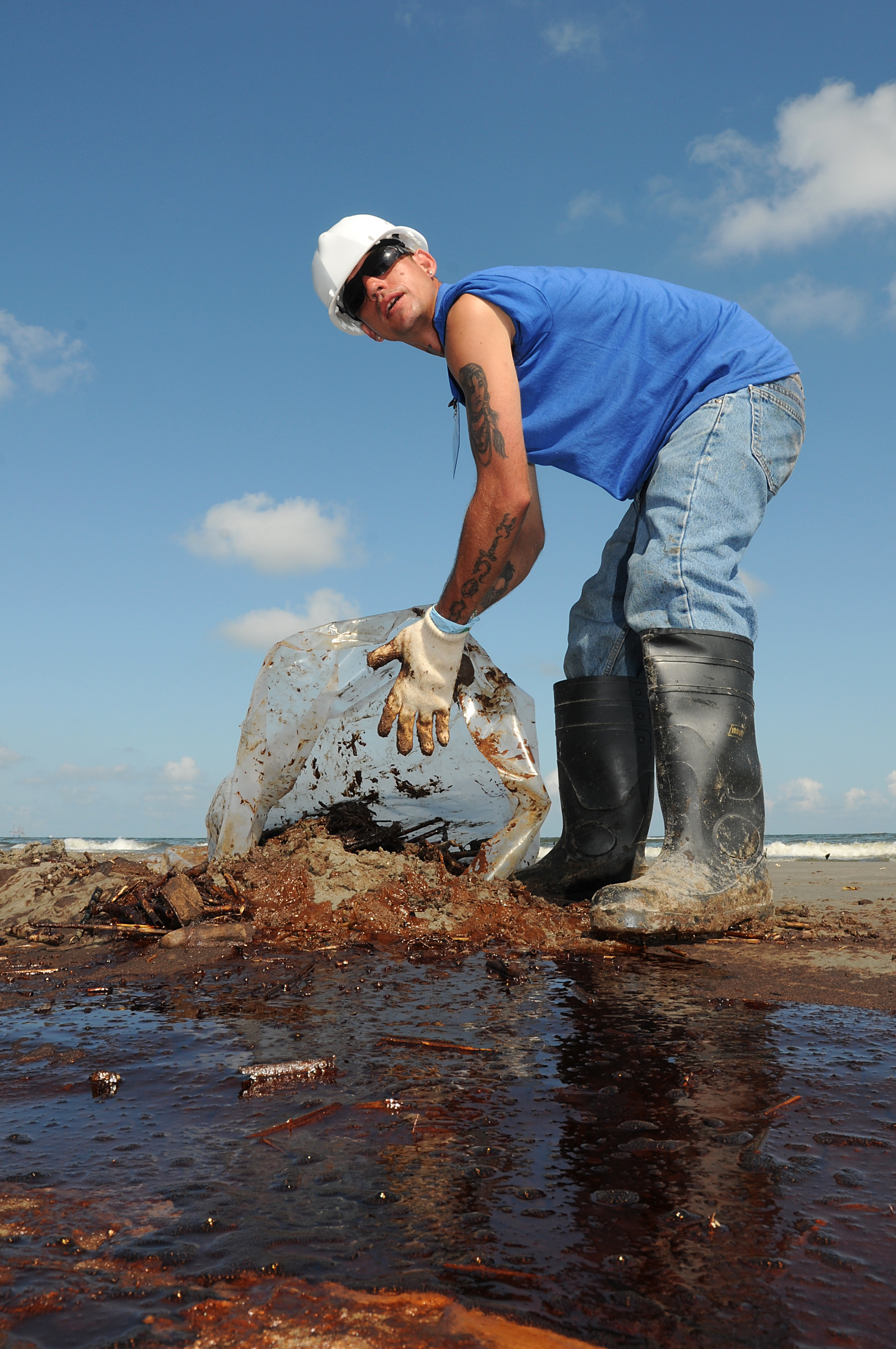
A worker cleans up oily waste on Elmer's Island just west of Grand Isle, Louisiana, 21 May 2010

The United States Department of Health and Human Services set up the GuLF Study in June 2010 in response to these reports. The study is run by the National Institute of Environmental Health Sciences, and will last at least five years.

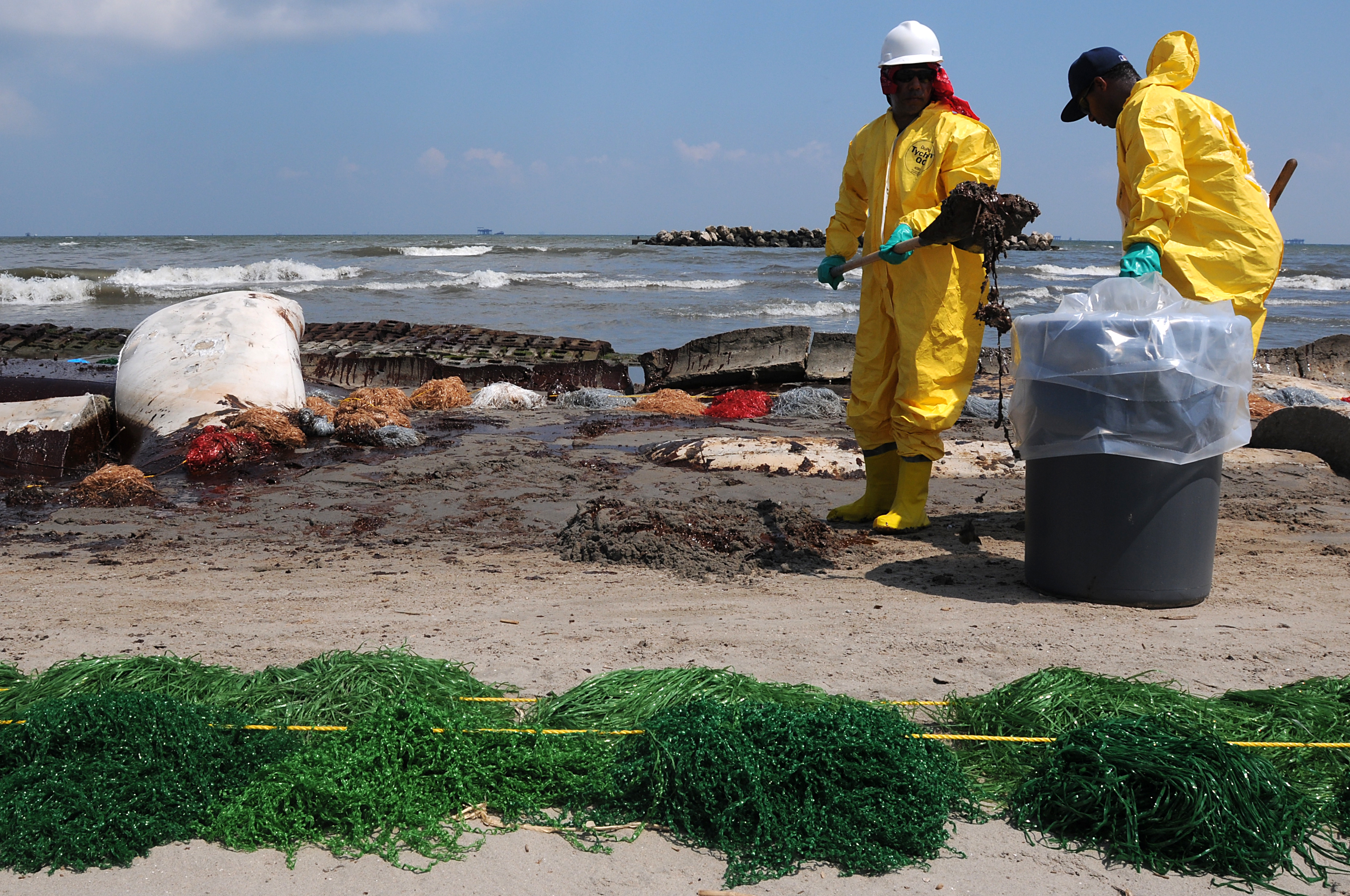
Workers contracted by BP clean up oil on a beach in Port Fourchon, Louisiana, 23 May 2010

Mike Robicheux, a Louisiana physician, described the situation as "the biggest public health crisis from a chemical poisoning in the history of this country." In July, after testing the blood of BP cleanup workers and residents in Louisiana, Mississippi, Alabama, and Florida for volatile organic compounds, environmental scientist Wilma Subra said she was "finding amounts 5 to 10 times in excess of the 95th percentile"; she said that "the presence of these chemicals in the blood indicates exposure." Riki Ott, a marine toxicologist with experience of the Exxon Valdez oil spill, advised families to evacuate the Gulf. She said that workers from the Valdez spill had suffered long-term health consequences.

Following the 26 May 2010 hospitalization of seven fishermen that were working in the cleanup crew, BP requested that the National Institute for Occupational Safety and Health perform a Health Hazard Evaluation. This was to cover all offshore cleanup activities; BP later requested a second NIOSH investigation of onshore cleanup operations. Tests for chemical exposure in the seven fishermen were negative; NIOSH concluded that the hospitalizations were most likely a result of heat, fatigue, and terpenes that were being used to clean the decks. Review of 10 later hospitalizations found that heat exposure and dehydration were consistent findings but could not establish chemical exposure. NIOSH personnel performed air monitoring around cleanup workers at sea, on land, and during the application of Corexit. Air concentrations of volatile organic compounds and PAHs never exceeded permissible exposure levels. A limitation of their methodology was that some VOCs may have already evaporated from the oil before they began their investigation. In their report, they suggest the possibility that respiratory symptoms might have been caused by high levels of ozone or reactive aldehydes in the air, possibly produced from photochemical reactions in the oil. NIOSH did note that many of the personnel involved were not donning personal protective equipment (gloves and impermeable coveralls) as they had been instructed to and emphasized that this was important protection against transdermal absorption of chemicals from the oil. Heat stress was found to be the most pressing safety concern.

Workers reported that they were not allowed to use respirators, and that their jobs were threatened if they did. OSHA said "cleanup workers are receiving "minimal" exposure to airborne toxins...OSHA will require that BP provide certain protective clothing, but not respirators." ProPublica reported that workers were being photographed while working with no protective clothing. An independent investigation for Newsweek showed that BP did not hand out the legally required safety manual for use with Corexit, and were not provided with safety training or protective gear.

A 2012 survey of the health effects of the spill on cleanup workers reported "eye, nose and throat irritation; respiratory problems; blood in urine, vomit and rectal bleeding; seizures; nausea and violent vomiting episodes that last for hours; skin irritation, burning and lesions; short-term memory loss and confusion; liver and kidney damage; central nervous system effects and nervous system damage; hypertension; and miscarriages". Dr. James Diaz, writing for the American Journal of Disaster Medicine, said these ailments appearing in the Gulf reflected those reported after previous oil spills, like the Exxon Valdez. Diaz warned that "chronic adverse health effects, including cancers, liver and kidney disease, mental health disorders, birth defects and developmental disorders should be anticipated among sensitive populations and those most heavily exposed". Diaz also believes neurological disorders should be expected.

Two years after the spill, a study initiated by the National Institute for Occupational Safety and Health found biomarkers matching the oil from the spill in the bodies of cleanup workers. Other studies have reported a variety of mental health issues, skin problems, breathing issues, coughing, and headaches. In 2013, during the three-day "Gulf of Mexico Oil Spill & Ecosystem Science Conference", findings discussed included a '"significant percentage" of Gulf residents reporting mental health problems like anxiety, depression and PTSD. These studies also showed that the bodies of former spill cleanup workers carry biomarkers of "many chemicals contained in the oil".

A study that investigated the health effects among children in Louisiana and Florida living less than 10 miles from the coast found that more than a third of the parents reported physical or mental health symptoms among their children. The parents reported "unexplained symptoms among their children, including bleeding ears, nose bleeds, and the early start of menstruation among girls," according to David Abramson, director of Columbia University's National Center for Disaster Preparedness.

A cohort study of almost 2,200 Louisiana women found "high physical/environmental exposure was significantly associated with all 13 of the physical health symptoms surveyed, with the strongest associations for burning in nose, throat or lungs; sore throat; dizziness and wheezing. Women who suffered a high degree of economic disruption as a result of spill were significantly more likely to report wheezing; headaches; watery, burning, itchy eyes and stuffy, itchy, runny nose.

=== Economy ===
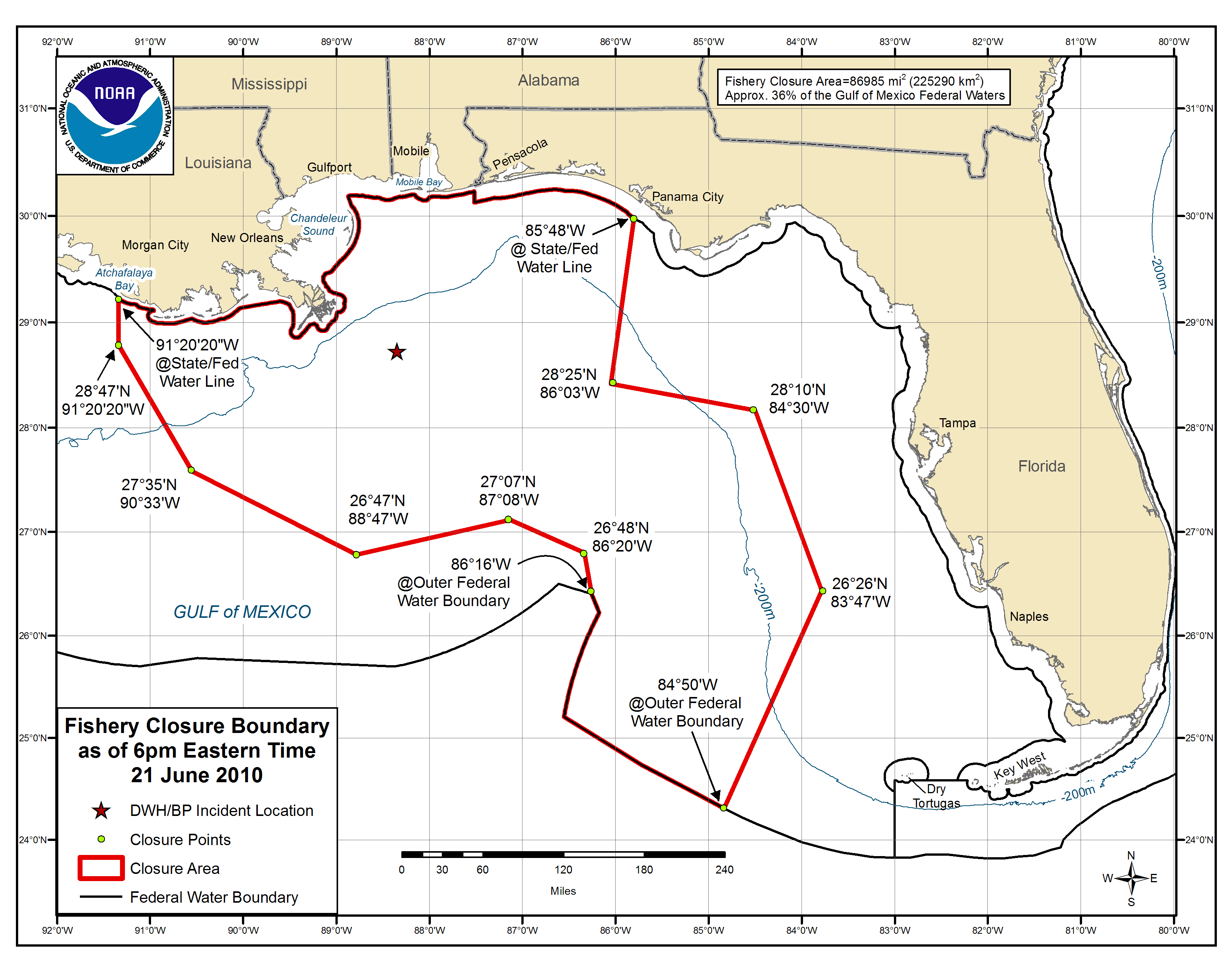
Map of the area where fishing was affected because of the BP oil spill

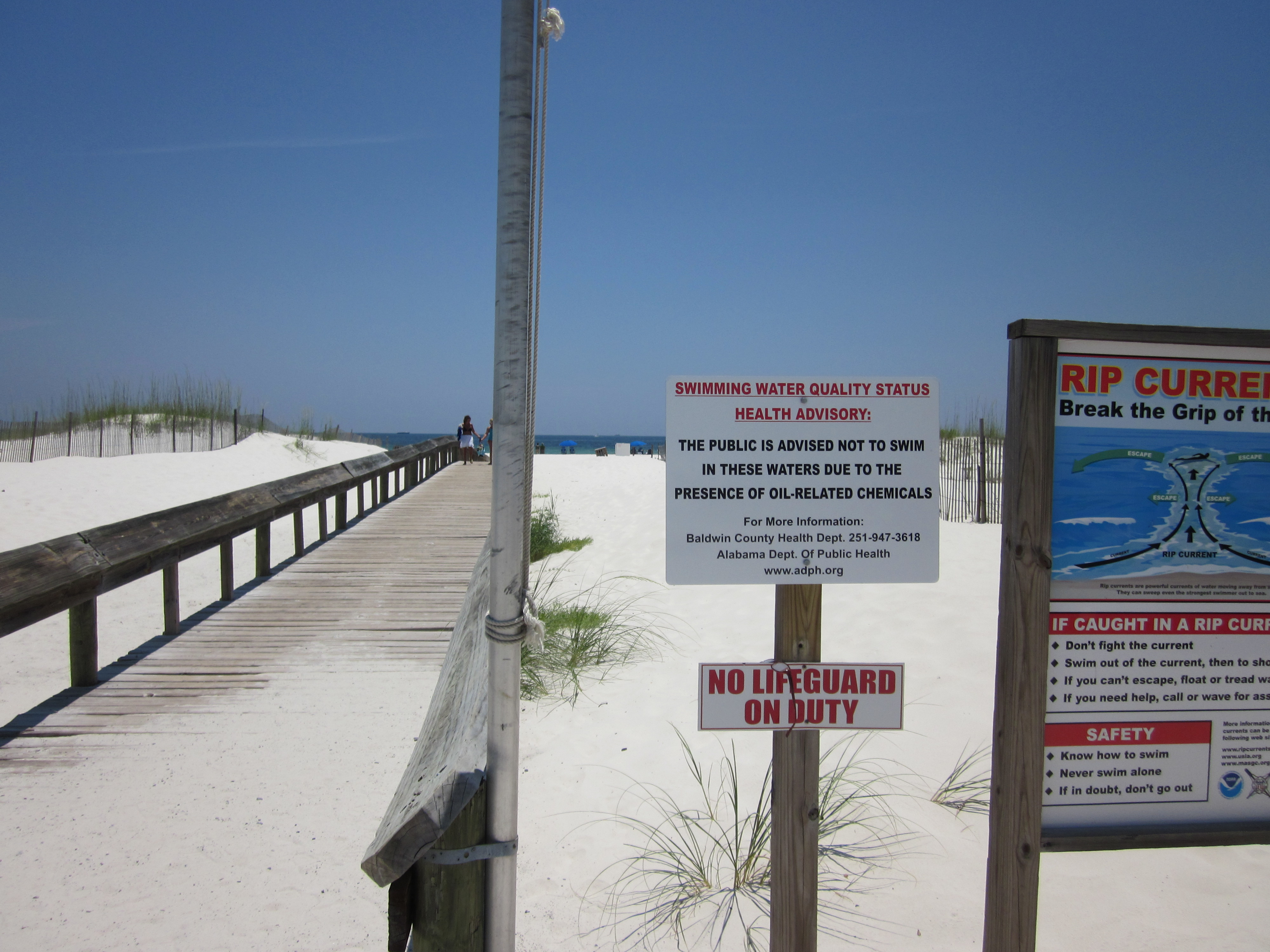
Sign in Orange Beach, Alabama, advising against swimming due to the oil spill

The spill had a strong economic impact to BP and also the Gulf Coast's economy sectors such as offshore drilling, fishing and tourism. Estimates of lost tourism dollars were projected to cost the Gulf coastal economy up to $22.7 billion through 2013. In addition, Louisiana reported that lost visitor spending through the end of 2010 totaled $32 million, and losses through 2013 were expected to total $153 million in this state alone. The Gulf of Mexico commercial fishing industry was estimated to have lost $247 million as a result of postspill fisheries closures. One study projects that the overall impact of lost or degraded commercial, recreational, and mariculture fisheries in the Gulf could be $8.7 billion by 2020, with a potential loss of 22,000 jobs over the same time frame. BP's expenditures on the spill included the cost of the spill response, containment, relief well drilling, grants to the Gulf states, claims paid, and federal costs, including fines and penalties. Due to the loss of the market value, BP had dropped from the second to the fourth largest of the four major oil companies by 2013. During the crisis, BP gas stations in the United States reported a sales drop of between 10 and 40% due to backlash against the company.

Local officials in Louisiana expressed concern that the offshore drilling moratorium imposed in response to the spill would further harm the economies of coastal communities as the oil industry directly or indirectly employs about 318,000 Louisiana residents (17% of all jobs in the state). NOAA had closed 86,985 sq mi (225,290 km^{2}), or approximately 36% of Federal waters in the Gulf of Mexico, for commercial fishing causing $2.5 billion cost for the fishing industry. The U.S. Travel Association estimated that the economic impact of the oil spill on tourism across the Gulf Coast over a three-year period could exceed approximately $23 billion, in a region that supports over 400,000 travel industry jobs generating $34 billion in revenue annually.

=== Offshore drilling policies ===
US oil production and imports, 1910–2020

On 30 April 2010, President Barack Obama ordered the federal government to hold the issuing of new offshore drilling leases and authorized the investigation of 29 oil rigs in the Gulf in an effort to determine the cause of the disaster. Later a six-month offshore drilling (below 500 ft (150 m) of water) moratorium was enforced by the United States Department of the Interior. The moratorium suspended work on 33 rigs, and a group of affected companies formed the Back to Work Coalition. On 22 June, a United States federal judge on the United States District Court for the Eastern District of Louisiana Martin Leach-Cross Feldman when ruling in the case Hornbeck Offshore Services LLC v. Salazar, lifted the moratorium finding it too broad, arbitrary and not adequately justified. The ban was lifted in October 2010.

Prior to the oil spill, on 31 March 2010, Obama ended a ban on oil and gas drilling along the majority of the East Coast of the United States and along the coast of northern Alaska in an effort to win support for an energy and climate bill and to reduce foreign imports of oil and gas.

On 28 April 2010, the National Energy Board of Canada, which regulates offshore drilling in the Canadian Arctic and along the British Columbia Coast, issued a letter to oil companies asking them to explain their argument against safety rules which require same-season relief wells. On 3 May California Governor Arnold Schwarzenegger withdrew his support for a proposed plan to allow expanded offshore drilling projects in California. On 8 July, Florida Governor Charlie Crist called for a special session of the state legislature to draft an amendment to the state constitution banning offshore drilling in state waters, which the legislature rejected on 20 July.

In October 2011, the United States Department of the Interior's Minerals Management Service was dissolved after it was determined it had exercised poor oversight over the drilling industry. Three new agencies replaced it, separating the regulation, leasing, and revenue collection responsibilities respectively, among the Bureau of Safety and Environmental Enforcement, the Bureau of Ocean Energy Management, and Office of Natural Resources Revenue.

In March 2014, BP was again allowed to bid for oil and gas leases.

== Reactions ==
=== U.S. reactions ===
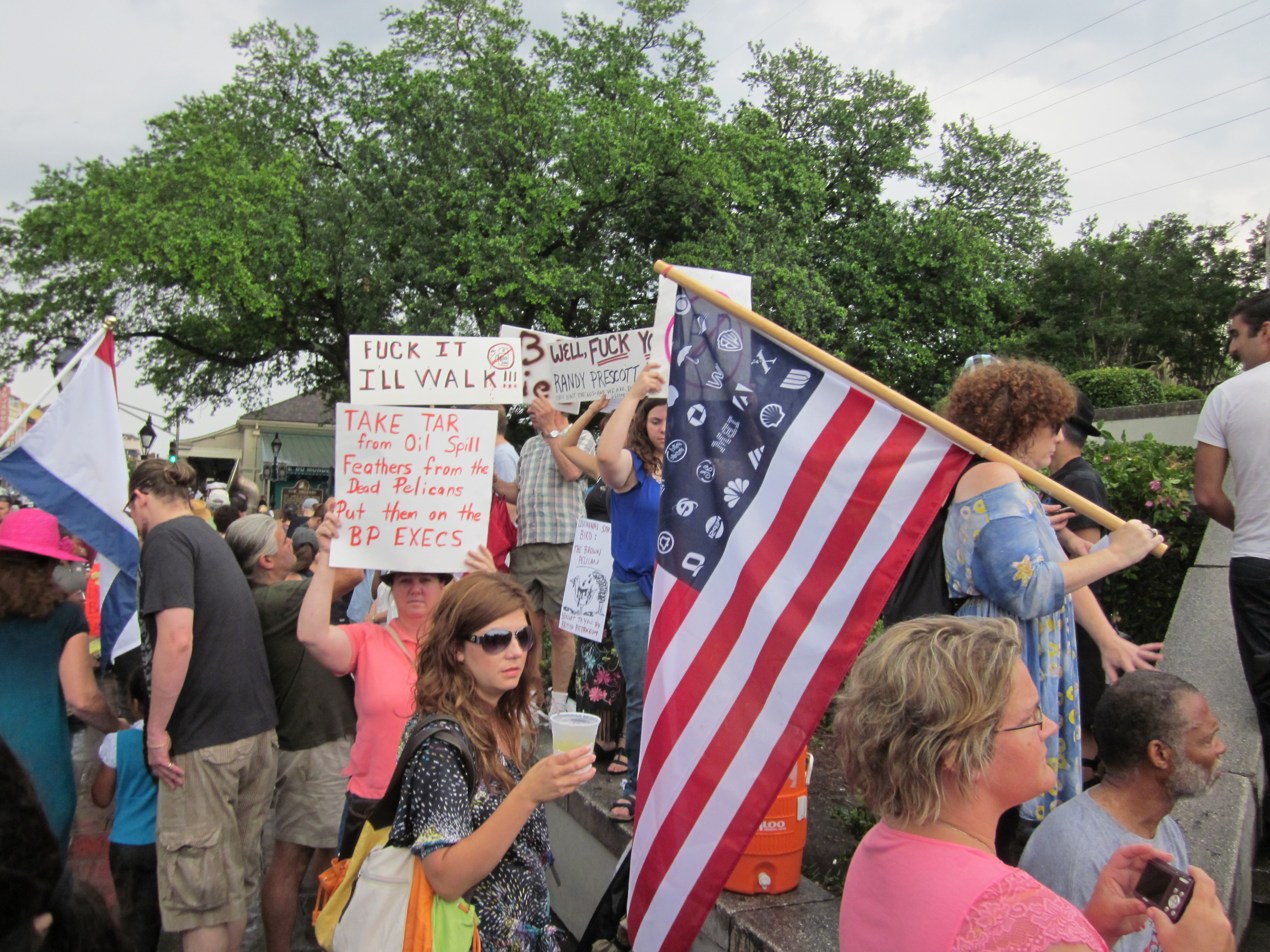
Protesters advocating boycott of BP

On 30 April, President Obama dispatched the Secretaries of the Department of Interior and Homeland Security, as well as the EPA Administrator and NOAA to the Gulf Coast to assess the disaster. In his 15 June speech, Obama said, "This oil spill is the worst environmental disaster America has ever faced... Make no mistake: we will fight this spill with everything we've got for as long as it takes. We will make BP pay for the damage their company has caused. And we will do whatever's necessary to help the Gulf Coast and its people recover from this tragedy." Interior Secretary Ken Salazar stated, "Our job basically is to keep the boot on the neck of British Petroleum." Some observers suggested that the Obama administration was being overly aggressive in its criticisms, which some BP investors saw as an attempt to deflect criticism of his own handling of the crisis. Rand Paul accused President Obama of being anti-business and "un-American".

Public opinion polls in the U.S. were generally critical of the way President Obama and the federal government handled the disaster and they were extremely critical of BP's response. Across the US, thousands participated in dozens of protests at BP gas stations and other locations, reducing sales at some stations by 10% to 40%. An academic study that assesses government response to the disaster notes that the severity of disruption substantially influences the social construction of the occasion as policy actors are ill-equipped to handle the challenges at all levels of government.

The petroleum industry claimed that disasters are infrequent and that this spill was an isolated incident and rejected claims of a loss of industry credibility. The American Petroleum Institute (API) stated that the offshore drilling industry is important to job creation and economic growth. CEOs from the top five oil companies all agreed to work harder at improving safety. API announced the creation of an offshore safety institute, separate from API's lobbying operation.

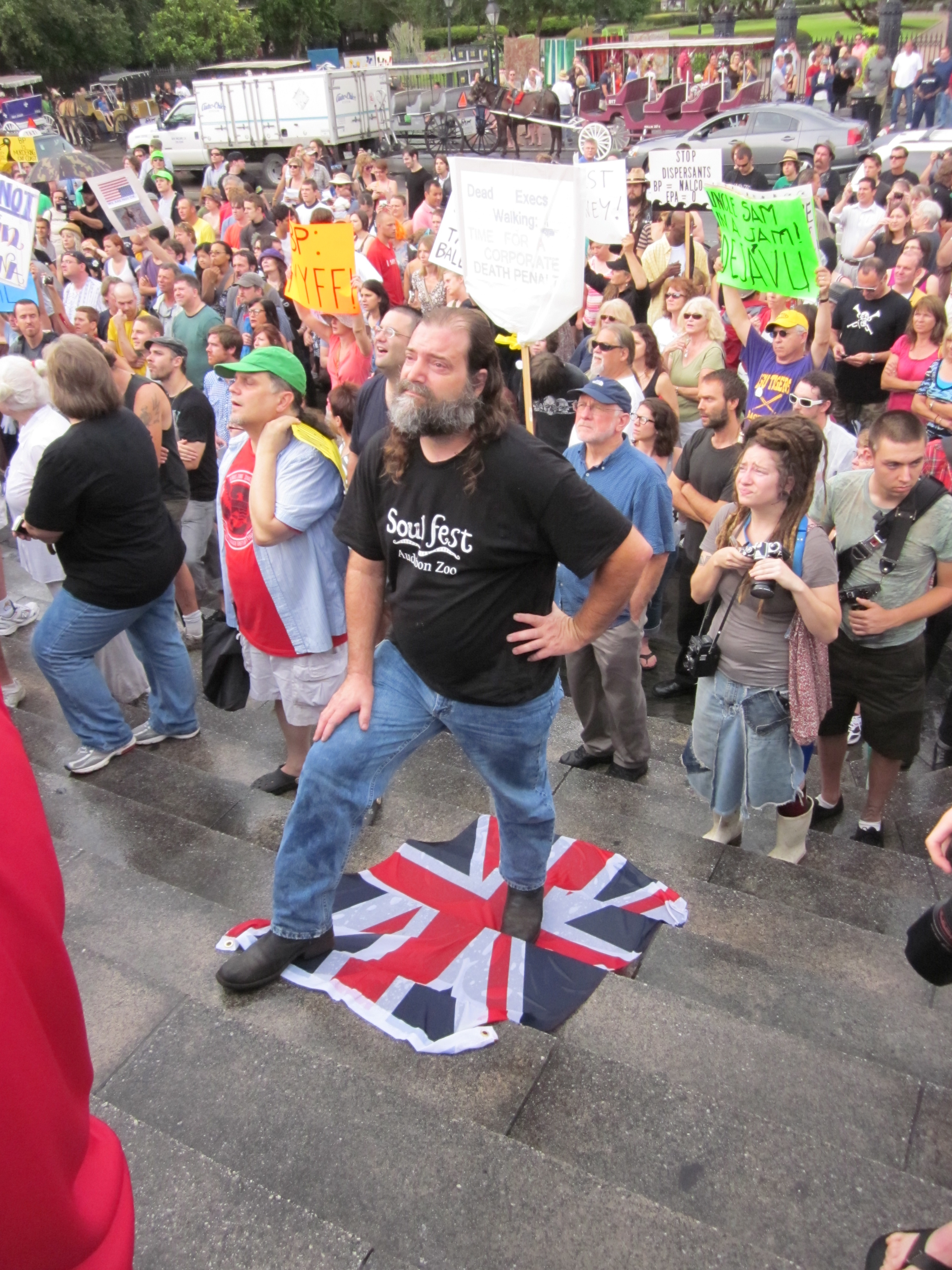
American protester stands on a Union Flag, presumably associating BP with the United Kingdom

The Organization for International Investment, a Washington D.C.-based advocate for overseas investment in the United States, warned that the heated rhetoric was potentially damaging the reputation of British companies with operations in the United States and could spark a wave of U.S. protectionism that would restrict British firms from government contracts, political donations and lobbying.

In July 2010, President Obama issued an executive order, specifically citing the Deepwater Horizon oil spill, that adopted recommendations from the Interagency Ocean Policy Task Force and established the National Ocean Council. The council called together a number of federal committees and departments engaged in ocean issues to work with a newly established committee for conservation and resource management. In June 2018, the executive order establishing the National Ocean Council was revoked by then-U.S. president Donald Trump in an effort to roll back bureaucracy and benefit "ocean industries [that] employ millions of Americans".

=== United Kingdom reactions ===
In the UK, there was anger at the American press and news outlets for the misuse of the term "British Petroleum" for the company – a name which has not been used since British Petroleum merged with the American company Amoco in 1998 to form BP Amoco. It was said that the U.S. was "dumping" the blame onto the British people and there were calls for British Prime Minister David Cameron to protect British interests in the United States. British pension fund managers (who have large holdings of BP shares and rely upon its dividends) accepted that while BP had to pay compensation for the spill and the environmental damage, they argued that the cost to the company's market value from President Obama's criticism was far outweighing the direct clean-up costs.

Initially, BP downplayed the incident; its CEO Tony Hayward called the amount of oil and dispersant "relatively tiny" in comparison with the "very big ocean". Later, he drew an outpouring of criticism when he said that the spill was a disruption to Gulf Coast residents and himself adding, "You know, I'd like my life back." BP's chief operating officer Doug Suttles contradicted the underwater plume discussion noting, "It may be down to how you define what a plume is here… The oil that has been found is in very minute quantities." In June, BP launched a PR campaign and successfully bid for several search terms related to the spill on Google and other search engines so that the first sponsored search result linked directly to the company's website. On 26 July 2010, it was announced that CEO Tony Hayward was to resign and would be replaced by Bob Dudley, who is an American citizen and previously worked for Amoco.

Hayward's involvement in Deepwater Horizon has left him a highly controversial public figure. In May 2013, he was honored as a "distinguished leader" by the University of Birmingham, but his award ceremony was stopped on multiple occasions by jeers and walk-outs and the focus of a protest from People & Planet members.

In July 2013, Hayward was awarded an honorary degree from Robert Gordon University. This was described as a "sick joke" and "a very serious error of judgement" by Friends of the Earth Scotland. The student body president expressed that students would be "very disappointed".

=== International reactions ===
The U.S. government rejected offers of cleanup help from Canada, Croatia, France, Germany, Ireland, Mexico, the Netherlands, Norway, Romania, South Korea, Spain, Sweden, the United Kingdom, and the United Nations. The U.S. State Department listed 70 assistance offers from 23 countries, all being initially declined, but later, 8 had been accepted. The USCG actively requested skimming boats and equipment from several countries.

== Legal aspects and settlements ==
=== Investigations ===
In the United States the Deepwater Horizon investigation included several investigations and commissions, including reports by:

- the USCG National Incident Commander, Admiral Thad Allen,
- the National Commission on the BP Deepwater Horizon Oil Spill and Offshore Drilling,
- Bureau of Ocean Energy Management, Regulation and Enforcement (BOEMRE),
- National Academy of Engineering,
- National Research Council,
- Government Accountability Office,
- National Oil Spill Commission, and
- Chemical Safety and Hazard Investigation Board.

The Republic of the Marshall Islands Maritime Administrator conducted a separate investigation on the marine casualty. BP conducted its internal investigation.

An investigation of the possible causes of the explosion was launched on 22 April 2010 by the USCG and the Minerals Management Service. On 11 May the United States administration requested the National Academy of Engineering conduct an independent technical investigation. The National Commission on the BP Deepwater Horizon Oil Spill and Offshore Drilling was established on 22 May to "consider the root causes of the disaster and offer options on safety and environmental precautions." The investigation by United States Attorney General Eric Holder was announced on 1 June 2010. Also the United States House Committee on Energy and Commerce conducted a number of hearings, including hearings of Tony Hayward and heads of Anadarko and Mitsui's exploration unit. According to the US Congressional investigation, the rig's blowout preventer, built by Cameron International Corporation, had a hydraulic leak and a failed battery, and therefore failed.

On 8 September 2010, BP released a 193-page report on its web site. The report places some of the blame for the accident on BP but also on Halliburton and Transocean. The report found that on 20 April 2010, managers misread pressure data and gave their approval for rig workers to replace drilling fluid in the well with seawater, which was not heavy enough to prevent gas that had been leaking into the well from firing up the pipe to the rig, causing the explosion. The conclusion was that BP was partly to blame, as was Transocean, which owned the rig. Responding to the report, Transocean and Halliburton placed all blame on BP.

On 9 November 2010, a report by the Oil Spill Commission said that there had been "a rush to completion" on the well and criticised poor management decisions. "There was not a culture of safety on that rig," the co-chair said.

The National Commission on the BP Deepwater Horizon Oil Spill and Offshore Drilling released a final report on 5 January 2011. The panel found that BP, Halliburton, and Transocean had attempted to work more cheaply and thus helped to trigger the explosion and ensuing leakage. The report stated that "whether purposeful or not, many of the decisions that BP, Halliburton, and Transocean made that increased the risk of the Macondo blowout clearly saved those companies significant time (and money)." BP released a statement in response to this, saying, that "even prior to the conclusion of the commission's investigation, BP instituted significant changes designed to further strengthen safety and risk management." Transocean, however, blamed BP for making the decisions before the actual explosion occurred and government officials for permitting those decisions. Halliburton stated that it was acting only upon the orders of BP when it injected the cement into the wall of the well. It criticized BP for its failure to run a cement bond log test. In the report, BP was accused of nine faults. One was that it had not used a diagnostic tool to test the strength of the cement. Another was ignoring a pressure test that had failed. Still another was for not plugging the pipe with cement. The study did not, however, place the blame on any one of these events. Rather, it concluded that "notwithstanding these inherent risks, the accident of April 20 was avoidable" and that "it resulted from clear mistakes made in the first instance by BP, Halliburton and Transocean, and by government officials who, relying too much on industry's assertions of the safety of their operations, failed to create and apply a program of regulatory oversight that would have properly minimized the risk of deepwater drilling." The panel also noted that the government regulators did not have sufficient knowledge or authority to notice these cost-cutting decisions.

On 23 March 2011, BOEMRE (former MMS) and the USCG published a forensic examination report on the blowout preventer, prepared by Det Norske Veritas. The report concluded that the primary cause of failure was that the blind shear rams failed to fully close and seal due to a portion of drill pipe buckling between the shearing blocks.

The US government report issued in September 2011 stated that BP is ultimately responsible for the spill, and that Halliburton and Transocean share some of the blame. The report states that the main cause was the defective cement job, and Halliburton, BP and Transocean were, in different ways, responsible for the accident. The report stated that, although the events leading to the sinking of Deepwater Horizon were set into motion by the failure to prevent a well blowout, the investigation revealed numerous systems deficiencies, and acts and omissions by Transocean and its Deepwater Horizon crew, that had an adverse impact on the ability to prevent or limit the magnitude of the disaster. The report also states that a central cause of the blowout was failure of a cement barrier allowing hydrocarbons to flow up the wellbore, through the riser and onto the rig, resulting in the blowout. The loss of life and the subsequent pollution of the Gulf of Mexico were the result of poor risk management, last‐minute changes to plans, failure to observe and respond to critical indicators, inadequate well control response, and insufficient emergency bridge response training by companies and individuals responsible for drilling at the Macondo well and for the operation of the drilling platform.

=== Spill response fund ===
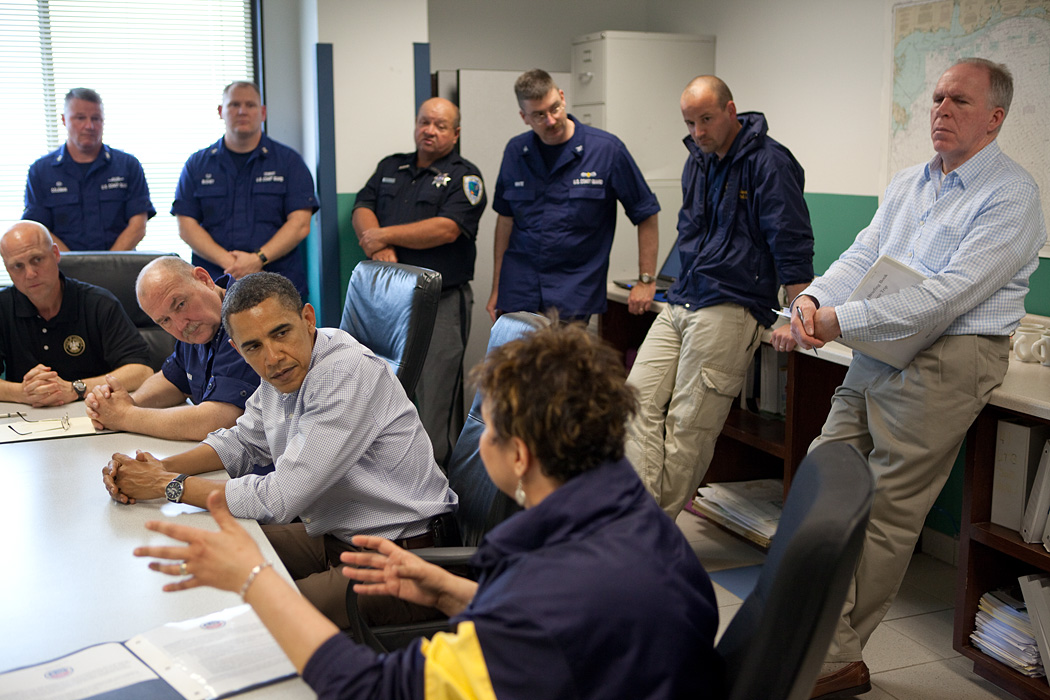
President Barack Obama meets with National Incident Commander, Admiral Thad Allen, and EPA Administrator Lisa Jackson to discuss response to the spill.

On 16 June 2010, after BP executives met with President Obama, BP announced and established the Gulf Coast Claims Facility (GCCF), a $20 billion fund to settle claims arising from the Deepwater Horizon spill. This fund was set aside for natural resource damages, state and local response costs, and individual compensation, but could not be used for fines or penalties. Prior to establishing the GCCF, emergency compensation was paid by BP from an initial facility.

The GCCF was administrated by attorney Kenneth Feinberg. The facility began accepting claims on 23 August 2010. On 8 March 2012, after BP and a team of plaintiffs' attorneys agreed to a class-action settlement, a court-supervised administrator Patrick Juneau took over administration. Until this more than one million claims of 220,000 individual and business claimants were processed and more than $6.2 billion was paid out from the fund. 97% of payments were made to claimants in the Gulf States. In June 2012, the settlement of claims through the GCCF was replaced by the court-supervised settlement program. During this transition period additional $404 million in claims were paid.

The GCCF and its administrator Feinberg had been criticized about the amount and speed of payments as well as a lack of transparency. An independent audit of the GCCF, announced by Attorney General Eric Holder, was approved by Senate on 21 October 2011. An auditor BDO Consulting found that 7,300 claimants were wrongly denied or underpaid. As a result, about $64 million of additional payments was made. The Mississippi Center for Justice provided pro bono assistance to 10,000 people to help them "navigate the complex claims process." In a New York Times opinion piece, Stephen Teague, staff attorney at the Mississippi Center for Justice, argued that BP had become "increasingly brazen" in "stonewalling payments." "But tens of thousands of gulf residents still haven't been fully compensated for their losses, and many are struggling to make ends meet. Many low-wage workers in the fishing and service industries, for example, have been seeking compensation for lost wages and jobs for three years."

In July 2013, BP made a motion in court to freeze payments on tens of thousands of claims, arguing inter alia that a staff attorney from the Deepwater Horizon Court-Supervised Settlement Program, the program responsible for evaluating compensation claims, had improperly profited from claims filed by a New Orleans law firm. The attorney is said to have received portions of settlement claims for clients he referred to the firm. The federal judge assigned to the case, Judge Barbier, refused to halt the settlement program, saying he had not seen evidence of widespread fraud, adding that he was "offended by what he saw as attempts to smear the lawyer administering the claims."

=== Civil litigation and settlements ===
By 26 May 2010, over 130 lawsuits relating to the spill had been filed against one or more of BP, Transocean, Cameron International Corporation, and Halliburton Energy Services, although it was considered likely by observers that these would be combined into one court as a multidistrict litigation. On 21 April 2011, BP issued $40 billion worth of lawsuits against rig owner Transocean, cementer Halliburton and blowout preventer manufacturer Cameron. The oil firm alleged failed safety systems and irresponsible behaviour of contractors had led to the explosion, including claims that Halliburton failed to properly use modelling software to analyze safe drilling conditions. The firms deny the allegations.

On 2 March 2012, BP and plaintiffs agreed to settle their lawsuits. The deal would settle roughly 100,000 claims filed by individuals and businesses affected by the spill. On 13 August, BP asked US District Judge Carl Barbier to approve the settlement, saying its actions "did not constitute gross negligence or willful misconduct". On 13 January 2013, Judge Barbier approved a medical-benefits portion of BP's proposed $7.8 billion partial settlement. People living for at least 60 days along oil-impacted shores or involved in the clean-up who can document one or more specific health conditions caused by the oil or dispersants are eligible for benefits, as are those injured during clean-up. BP also agreed to spend $105 million over five years to set up a Gulf Coast health outreach program and pay for medical examinations. According to a group presenting the plaintiffs, the deal has no specific cap. BP says that it has $9.5 billion in assets set aside in a trust to pay the claims, and the settlement will not increase the $37.2 billion the company budgeted for spill-related expenses. BP originally expected to spend $7.8 billion. By October 2013 it had increased its projection to $9.2 billion, saying it could be "significantly higher."

On 31 August 2012, the US Department of Justice (DOJ) filed papers in federal court in New Orleans blaming BP for the Gulf oil spill, describing the spill as an example of "gross negligence and willful misconduct". In their statement the DOJ said that some of BP's arguments were "plainly misleading" and that the court should ignore BP's argument that the Gulf region is "undergoing a robust recovery". BP rejected the charges saying "BP believes it was not grossly negligent and looks forward to presenting evidence on this issue at trial in January." The DOJ also said Transocean, the owner and operator of the Deepwater Horizon rig, was guilty of gross negligence as well.

On 14 November 2012, BP and the US Department of Justice reached a settlement. BP will pay $4.5 billion in fines and other payments, the largest of its kind in US history. In addition, the U.S. government temporarily banned BP from new federal contracts over its "lack of business integrity". The plea was accepted by Judge Sarah Vance of the United States District Court for the Eastern District of Louisiana on 31 January 2013. The settlement includes payments of $2.394 billion to the National Fish and Wildlife Foundation, $1.15 billion to the Oil Spill Liability Trust Fund, $350 million to the National Academy of Sciences for oil spill prevention and response research, $100 million to the North America Wetland Conservation Fund, $6 million to General Treasury and $525 million to the Securities and Exchange Commission. Oil sector analysts at London-based investment bank Canaccord Genuity noted that a settlement along the lines disclosed would only be a partial resolution of the many claims against BP.

On 3 January 2013, the US Justice Department announced "Transocean Deepwater Inc. has agreed to plead guilty to violating the Clean Water Act and to pay a total of $1.4 billion in civil and criminal fines and penalties". $800 million goes to Gulf Coast restoration Trust Fund, $300 million to the Oil Spill Liability Trust Fund, $150 million to the National Wild Turkey Federation and $150 million to the National Academy of Sciences. MOEX Offshore 2007 agreed to pay $45 million to the Oil Spill Liability Trust Fund, $25 million to five Gulf state and $20 million to supplemental environmental projects.

On 25 July 2013, Halliburton pleaded guilty to destruction of critical evidence after the oil spill and said it would pay the maximum allowable fine of $200,000 and will be subject to three years of probation.

In January 2014, a panel of the U.S. Fifth Circuit Court of Appeals rejected an effort by BP to curb payment of what it described as "fictitious" and "absurd" claims to a settlement fund for businesses and persons affected by the oil spill. BP said administration of the 2012 settlement was marred by the fact that people without actual damages could file a claim. The court ruled that BP had not explained "how this court or the district court should identify or even discern the existence of 'claimants that have suffered no cognizable injury.'" The Court then went further, calling BP's position "nonsensical". The Supreme Court of the United States later refused to hear BP's appeal after victims and claimants, along with numerous Gulf coast area chambers of commerce, objected to the oil major's efforts to renege on the Settlement Agreement.

In September 2014, Halliburton agreed to settle a large percentage of legal claims against it by paying $1.1 billion into a trust by way of three installments over two years.

=== Justice Department lawsuit ===
BP and its partners in the oil well, Transocean and Halliburton, went on trial on 25 February 2013 in the United States District Court for the Eastern District of Louisiana in New Orleans to determine payouts and fines under the Clean Water Act and the Natural Resources Damage Assessment. The plaintiffs included the U.S. Justice Department, Gulf states and private individuals. Tens of billions of dollars in liability and fines were at stake. A finding of gross negligence would result in a four-fold increase in the fines BP would have to pay for violating the federal Clean Water Act, and leave the company liable for punitive damages for private claims.

The trial's first phase was to determine the liability of BP, Transocean, Halliburton, and other companies, and if they acted with gross negligence and willful misconduct. The second phase scheduled in September 2013 focused on the flow rate of the oil and the third phase scheduled in 2014 was to consider damages. According to the plaintiffs' lawyers the major cause of an explosion was the mishandling of a rig safety test, while inadequate training of the staff, poor maintenance of the equipment and substandard cement were also mentioned as things leading to the disaster. According to The Wall Street Journal the U.S. government and Gulf Coast states had prepared an offer to BP for a $16 billion settlement. However, it was not clear if this deal had been officially proposed to BP and if BP has accepted it.

On 4 September 2014, U.S. District Judge Carl Barbier ruled BP was guilty of gross negligence and willful misconduct. He described BP's actions as "reckless". He said Transocean's and Halliburton's actions were "negligent". He apportioned 67% of the blame for the spill to BP, 30% to Transocean, and 3% to Halliburton. Fines would be apportioned commensurate with the degree of negligence of the parties, measured against the number of barrels of oil spilled. Under the Clean Water Act fines can be based on a cost per barrel of up to $4,300, at the discretion of the judge. The number of barrels was in dispute at the conclusion of the trial with BP arguing 2.5 million barrels were spilled over the 87 days the spill lasted, while the court contends 4.2 million barrels were spilled. BP issued a statement strongly disagreeing with the finding, and saying the court's decision would be appealed.

Barbier ruled that BP had acted with "conscious disregard of known risks" and rejected BP's assertion that other parties were equally responsible for the oil spill. His ruling stated that BP "employees took risks that led to the largest environmental disaster in U.S. history", that the company was "reckless", and determined that several crucial BP decisions were "primarily driven by a desire to save time and money, rather than ensuring that the well was secure." BP strongly disagreed with the ruling and filed an immediate appeal.

On 2 July 2015, BP, the U.S. Justice Department and five gulf states announced that the company agreed to pay a record settlement of $18.7 billion. To date BP's cost for the clean-up, environmental and economic damages and penalties has reached $54 billion.

=== Natural Resource Damage Assessment ===
The Oil Pollution Act authorizes federal, state, and tribal governments to act as natural resource trustees on behalf of the public to: (1) assess natural resource injuries resulting from a discharge of oil or the substantial threat of a discharge and response activities and; (2) develop and implement a plan for restoration of injured resources. After the Deepwater Horizon spill, NOAA, U.S. Department of Interior, U.S. Environmental Protection Agency, U.S. Department of Agriculture, Alabama, Florida, Louisiana, Mississippi, and Texas formed the Deepwater Horizon Natural Resource Damage Assessment Trustee Council.

In April 2016, a settlement was finalized that included up to $8.8 billion for natural resource damage assessment and restoration. The Trustees will implement a restoration plan, which includes five broad goals to address injuries to natural resources: restore and conserve habitat, provide and enhance recreational opportunities, restore water quality, monitoring and adaptive management, and replenish and protect living coastal and marine resources.

=== Criminal charges ===
In addition to the private lawsuits and civil governmental actions, the federal government charged multiple companies and five individuals with federal crimes.

In the November 2012 resolution of the federal charges against it, BP agreed to plead guilty to 11 felony counts related to the deaths of the 11 workers and paid a $4 billion fine. Transocean pled guilty to a misdemeanor charge as part of its $1.4 billion fine.

In April 2012, the Justice Department filed the first criminal charge against Kurt Mix, a BP engineer, for obstructing justice by deleting messages showing that BP knew the flow rate was three times higher than initial claims by the company, and knew that "Top Kill" was unlikely to succeed, but claimed otherwise. Three more BP employees were charged in November 2012. Site managers Donald Vidrine and Robert Kaluza were charged with manslaughter for acting negligently in their supervision of key safety tests performed on the rig prior to the explosion, and failure to alert onshore engineers of problems in the drilling operation. David Rainey, BP's former vice-president for exploration in the Gulf of Mexico, was charged with obstructing Congress by misrepresenting the rate that oil was flowing out of the well. Lastly, Anthony Badalamenti, a Halliburton manager, was charged with instructing two employees to delete data related to Halliburton's cementing job on the oil well.

None of the charges against individuals resulted in any prison time, and no charges were levied against upper level executives. Anthony Badalementi was sentenced to one year probation, Donald Vidrine paid a $50,000 fine and received 10 months probation, Kurt Mix received 6 months' probation, and David Rainey and Robert Kaluza were acquitted.

== In popular culture ==
=== Documentary ===
- On 28 March 2011, Dispatches aired a documentary by James Brabazon, BP: In Deep Water, about the oil company, BP, covering oil spills in the Gulf of Mexico and other incidents and its relationship with governments.
- In April 2012, the National Geographic Channel's documentary series Seconds From Disaster featured the accident in an episode titled "The Deepwater Horizon"
- In 2012, Beyond Pollution 2012 traveled across the gulf coast interviewing environmental experts, government authorities, fishermen, scientists, drilling engineers, and key BP contractors, examining economic and health effects.
- In 2012, The Big Fix, documented the April 2010 oil spill in the Gulf of Mexico following the sinking of the Deepwater Horizon oil rig
- In 2014, The Great Invisible, by Margaret Brown chose to focus on the social impacts on people whose lives have been affected by this tragedy. Later airing 19 April 2015 as the season 16, episode 14 of Independent Lens.
- In 2014, Vanishing Pearls: The Oystermen of Pointe a la Hache, Louisiana, documented a town of nearly 300 struggling to survive following the oil spill that left their crop dead and finances in ruin.
- In 2016, Pretty Slick documented the cleanup effort and locals across four Gulf states about the largest man-made environmental disaster in U.S. history.
- In 2016, After the Spill, Jon Bowermaster investigates how the disaster affected local economies and the health of humans, animals, and food sources, and with Corexit, where all the oil went, as a follow-up to the pre-spill SoLa, Louisiana Water Stories, in post-production when the Deepwater Horizon exploded.
- In 2016, Dispatches from the Gulf, Hal Weiner follows scientists investigating the oil spill's effect on the Gulf.

=== Drama ===
- In 2012, "We Just Decided To", the pilot of the HBO TV series The Newsroom, featured its characters covering the Deepwater Horizon story.
- The 2015 film The Runner, directed by Austin Stark and starring Nicolas Cage, is a fictional story of a politician and his family set in the aftermath of the Deepwater Horizon disaster.
- In 2016, Deepwater Horizon, a film based on the explosion, directed by Peter Berg and starring Mark Wahlberg, Kurt Russell and John Malkovich was released.

=== Music ===
- In 2011, Jimmy Fallon, then host of Late Night with Jimmy Fallon, created a protest song about how there were still tarballs floating around the Gulf of Mexico called "Balls In Your Mouth". He performed it a number of times on the show with different guest singers, including Eddie Vedder, Russell Crowe, Brad Paisley, and Florence Welch. The live recording of the song featuring Eddie Vedder was included in Fallon's comedy album "Blow Your Pants Off".
- In 2011, Rise Against released a song titled "Help Is on the Way" on their album Endgame. The song is about the slow response time for aid to disaster-stricken areas, with lyrics that allude to the Macondo spill and Hurricane Katrina.
- In June 2011, Canadian musician City and Colour released a song titled "At the Bird's Foot" on his album Little Hell. The song is about the event and the greed of those involved.
- On election day in the United States, 6 November 2012, Pete Seeger and Lorre Wyatt released the music video and single "God's Counting on Me, God's Counting on You", which they recorded and filmed live aboard the Hudson River Sloop Clearwater in 2010 immediately after the Deepwater Horizon oil spill. The song references the spill.
- In 2012, American singer-songwriter Andrew Bird released the song "Hole in the Ocean Floor" referencing the Deepwater Horizon oil spill as his inspiration.

=== Television ===
- The Deepwater Horizon oil spill is referenced in a 2010 episode of South Park, "Coon 2: Hindsight". When a BP drilling vessel drills a new hole in the Gulf, it accidentally causes an oil spill in a protected zone, prompting one of the crewmen to exclaim "Oh, don't tell me we did it again?". Later on in the episode, BP drilled again and opened up a portal to another dimension, causing the Gulf to be attacked by its creatures. Then they drilled on the Moon hoping to change the gravitational pull on the Earth and quell the swells on the ocean, allowing them to place a cap on the portal. However, in doing this, Cthulhu emerged from the portal. Each time they drilled, Tony Hayward released a "we're sorry" campaign. The hole in the Gulf wasn't shut until two episodes later.
- The Beavis and Butt-Head season 8 episode, "Spill", takes place at the Gulf when their teacher, Mr. Van Driessen, organizes a trip to help clean baby birds affected by the oil spill. The boys mistakenly believe they will be having sex with "filthy chicks" and volunteer to go.

== See also ==
- Exxon Valdez oil spill
- List of industrial disasters
- List of oil spills
- Offshore oil and gas in the Gulf of Mexico (United States)
- Taylor oil spill
- Timeline of the Deepwater Horizon oil spill
- Two barrier rule
