= Deepwater Horizon oil spill response =

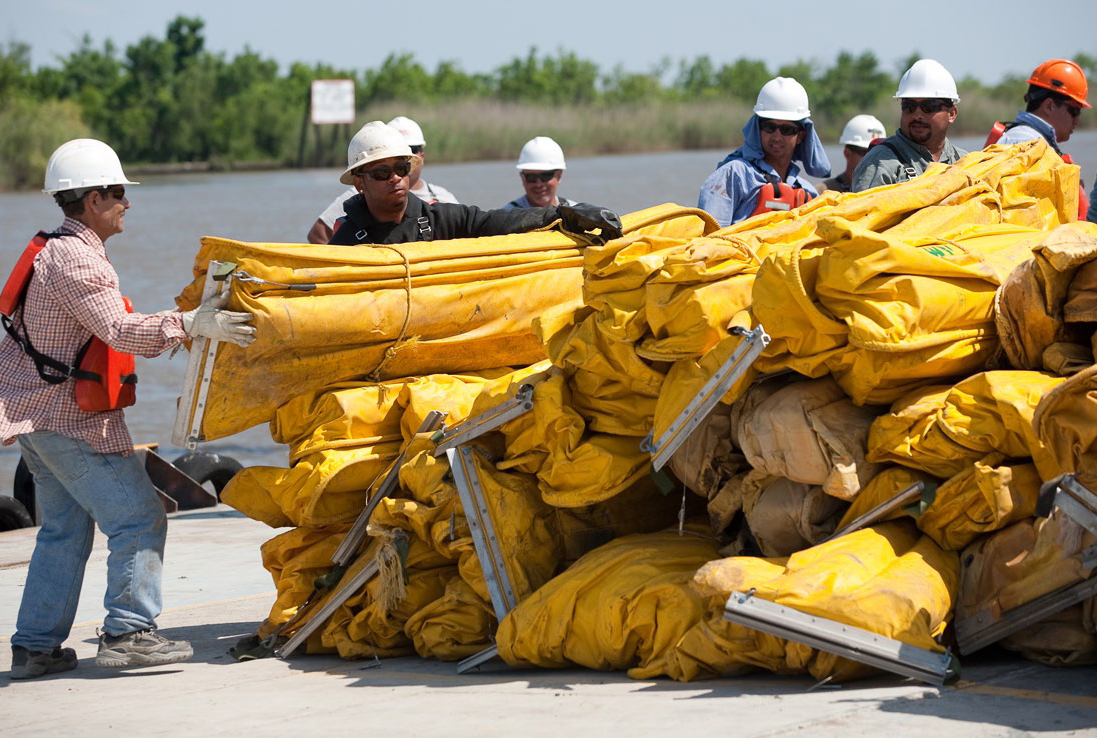
United States Environmental Services workers prepare oil containment booms for deployment

The containment, dispersal, and removal of oil in the Gulf of Mexico following the 2010 Deepwater Horizon oil spill employed a variety of techniques executed by private, volunteer, and governmental organisations. While most of the oil drilled off Louisiana is a lighter crude, the leaking oil was of a heavier blend which contained asphalt-like substances. According to Ed Overton, who heads a federal chemical hazard assessment team for oil spills, this type of oil emulsifies well. Once it becomes emulsified, it no longer evaporates as quickly as regular oil, does not rinse off as easily, cannot be broken down by microbes as easily, and does not burn as well. "That type of mixture essentially removes all the best oil clean-up weapons", Overton said.

On 6 May 2010, BP began documenting the daily response efforts on its web site. On 28 April, the US military joined the cleanup operation. The response increased in scale as the spill volume grew. Initially, BP employed remotely operated underwater vehicles (ROV's), 700 workers, 4 airplanes, and 32 vessels. By 29 April 69 vessels, including skimmers, tugs, barges, and recovery vessels, were in use. By 4 May 2010, the United States Coast Guard (USCG) estimated that 170 vessels, and nearly 7,500 personnel were participating, with an additional 2,000 volunteers assisting. These volunteers help build relief walls, burn the oil, clean the water and other affected bodies of water such as marshes, beaches, and shorelines, clean contaminated equipment and vessels, and were involved in both land and water response outreach.

In summer 2010, approximately 47,000 people and 7,000 vessels were involved in the response works. By 3 October 2012, federal response costs amounted $850 million, most of them reimbursed by BP. As of January 2013, 935 response personnel were still involved in response activities in the region. For that time BP's costs for cleanup operations exceeded $14 billion. The oil drill was finally sealed on 15 July 2010.

== Containment ==
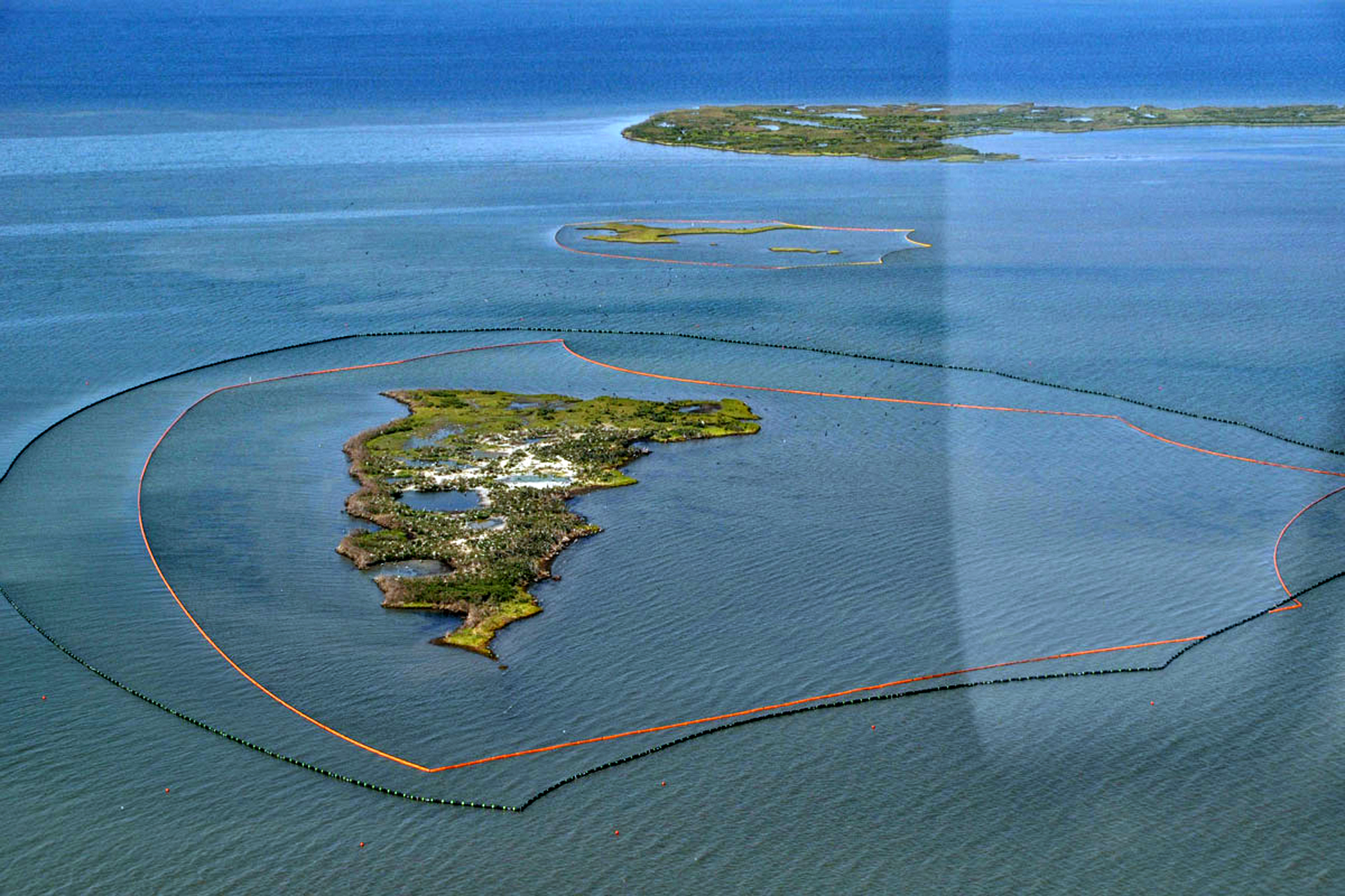
An oil containment boom deployed by the U.S. Navy surrounds New Harbor Island, Louisiana.

The response included deploying many miles of containment boom, whose purpose is to either corral the oil, or to block it from a marsh, mangrove, shrimp, crab, and/or oyster ranch, or other ecologically sensitive areas. Booms extend 18–48 inches (0.46–1.22 m) above and below the water surface and are effective only in relatively calm and slow-moving waters. More than 100,000 feet (30 km) of containment booms were initially deployed to protect the coast and the Mississippi River Delta. By the next day, that nearly doubled to 180,000 feet (55 km), with an additional 300,000 feet (91 km) staged or being deployed. In total, during the crisis 9,100,000 feet (2,800 km) one-time use sorbent booms and 4,200,000 feet (1,300 km) of containment booms were deployed.

Some lawmakers have questioned the effectiveness of the booms, claiming that there was not enough boom to protect the shoreline and that the boom was not always installed correctly. Billy Nungesser, president of Plaquemines Parish, Louisiana, said the boom "washes up on the shore with the oil, and then we have oil in the marsh, and we have an oily boom. So we have two problems". According to Naomi Klein, writing for The Guardian, "the ocean's winds and currents have made a mockery of the lightweight booms BP has laid out to absorb the oil." Byron Encalade, president of the Louisiana Oysters Association, told BP that the "oil's gonna go over the booms or underneath the bottom", and according to Klein, he was right. Rick Steiner, a marine biologist who closely followed the clean-up operations, estimated that "70% or 80% of the booms are doing absolutely nothing at all". Local officials along the gulf maintained that there was a scarcity of boom, especially the heavier "ocean boom". BP, in its regional plan, says that boom is not effective in waters with waves more than three to four feet high; waves in the gulf often exceed that height. One report commented that the response to this disaster was mainly focused on surface level clean-up instead of deep sea clean-up, prolonging the response time. And as we can see from the controversy over the booms, not all response efforts were effective.

=== Louisiana barrier island plan ===
The Louisiana barrier island plan is a project initiated by Louisiana to construct barrier islands in the Gulf of Mexico protecting the coast of Louisiana from contamination by crude oil escaping from the Deepwater Horizon oil spill. On 27 May 2010, acting on an application by the Louisiana Coastal Protection and Restoration Authority, the United States Army Corps of Engineers offered an emergency permit to the state to commence work.

The berms are 325 feet wide at the base and 25 feet wide at their summits, rising 6 feet above mean high water level. If fully built, the system would have been 128 miles long. In May 2010 the federal government issued permits to construct 45 miles. BP agreed to pay the estimated $360 million initial cost.

Critics of the project maintained that it would be expensive and ineffective: involving use of over 100 million yards of dredged material, costing $360 million, and taking 6 months to build. Issues include the length of time necessary to construct miles of berm and the anticipated effects of both normal and storm erosion on the structures. It is alleged by critics that the decision to pursue the project was made on a political basis with little input from the scientific experts.

After the BP well was capped on 15 July 2010, construction of the berms continued and was still underway in October 2010. The $360 million project was being financed by BP and being built under the supervision of the Army Corps of Engineers. If completed, and no further funding obtained, following modification of the project by the state, there would be a total of 22 miles of berm. As of October 2010 opposition to the project was growing and Thomas L. Strickland, assistant interior secretary for fish and wildlife and parks had called for re-evaluation of the project.

On 1 November 2010, it was announced by Louisiana Governor Bobby Jindal and BP that a revised agreement between them provided that $100 million of the remaining $140 million would be used to convert completed berms into artificial barrier islands by widening them and adding vegetation and the remaining funds used to finish up ongoing berm work. A total of 17 million cubic yards of sand had been dredged by November 2010, 12 million from the Mississippi River; 8.5 million cubic yards had been used to build the berms, the remainder being stockpiled.

The presidential commission concluded in December 2010 that the $220 million sand berms captured a "minuscule amount" of oil (1,000 barrels (160 m^{3})) and proved "underwhelmingly effective" as well as "overwhelmingly expensive". Of the $360 million BP gave for the berms, Louisiana plans to spend $140 million to turn the 36 miles of berms into barrier islands.

== Dispersal ==
The spill was also notable for the volume of Corexit oil dispersant used, as well as the methods of application which that time were "purely experimental". Although usage of dispersants was described as "most effective and fast moving tool for minimizing shoreline impact", this use of dispersant was questioned at the time and its effects continue to be questioned and investigated. Altogether, 1.84 million US gallons (7,000 m^{3}) of dispersants were used; of this 771,000 US gallons (2,920 m^{3}) were used subsea at the wellhead.

=== Choice and composition of Corexit ===
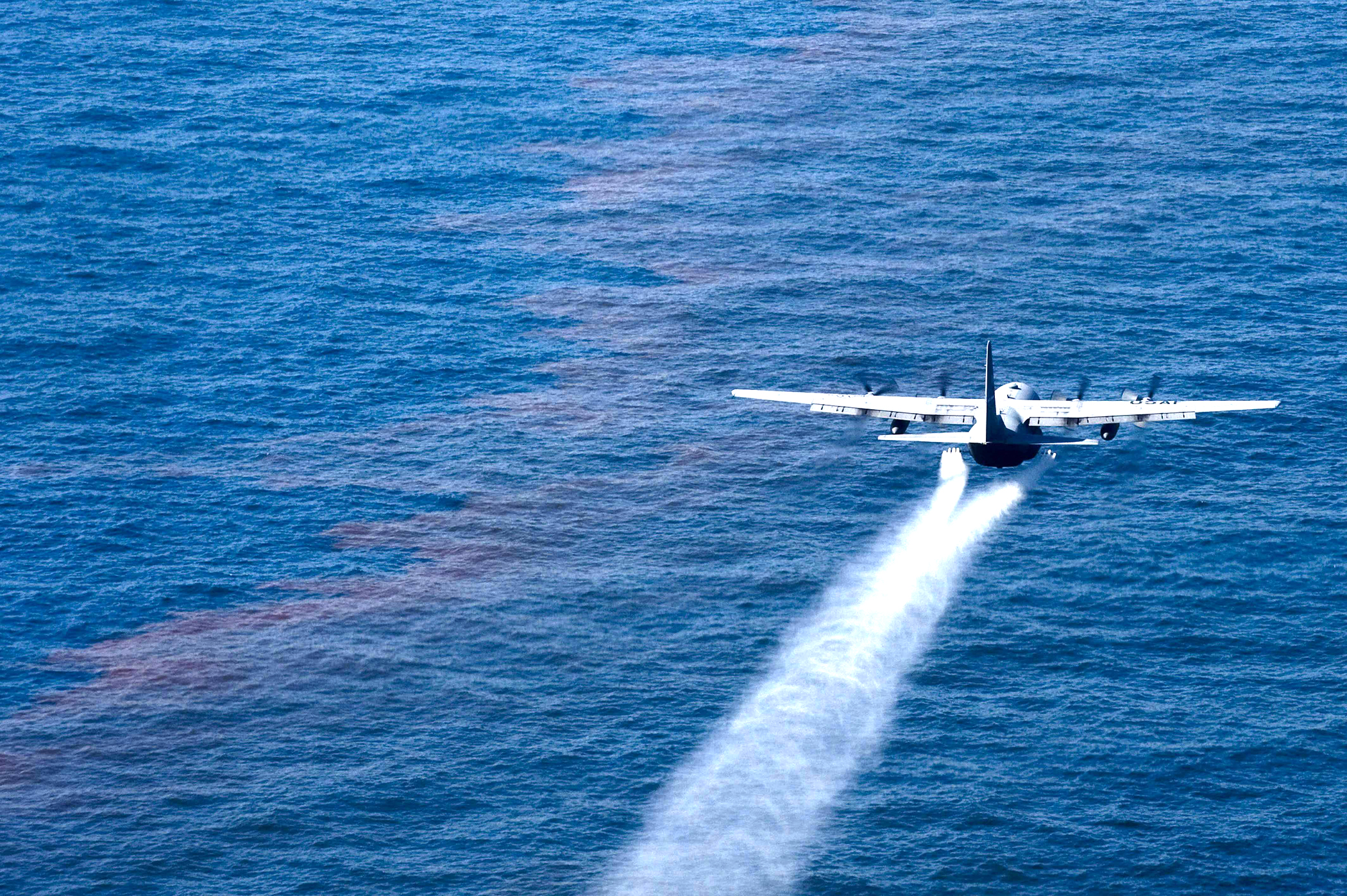
A C-130 Hercules sprays Corexit dispersant onto the Gulf of Mexico

Corexit EC9500A and Corexit EC9527A were the principal dispersants employed. The two formulations are neither the least toxic, nor the most effective, among the EPA's approved dispersants. Twelve other products received better toxicity and effectiveness ratings, but BP says it chose to use Corexit because it was available the week of the rig explosion. Critics contend that the major oil companies stockpile Corexit because of their close business relationship with its manufacturer Nalco.

Environmental groups attempted to obtain information regarding the composition and safety of ingredients in Corexit through the Freedom of Information Act but were denied by the EPA. After Earthjustice sued on behalf of the Gulf Restoration Network and the Florida Wildlife Federation, the EPA released a list of all 57 chemicals in the 14 dispersents on the EPA's National Contingency Plan Product Schedule. The dispersants used contain propylene glycol, 2-butoxyethanol, and dioctyl sodium sulfosuccinate.

Earthjustice and Toxipedia conducted the first analysis of the 57 chemicals found in Corexit formulas 9500 and 9527 in 2011. Results showed the dispersant could contain cancer-causing agents, hazardous toxins and endocrine-disrupting chemicals. The analysis found "5 chemicals are associated with cancer; 33 are associated with skin irritation from rashes to burns; 33 are linked to eye irritation; 11 are or [sic] are suspected of being potential respiratory toxins or irritants; 10 are suspected kidney toxins; 8 are suspected or known to be toxic to aquatic organisms; and 5 are suspected to have a moderate acute toxicity to fish".

=== Method and extent of use ===
Over 400 sorties were employed to spray dispersants over the spill. In early May 2010, four military C-130 Hercules aircraft, normally used to spray pesticides or fire retardant, were deployed to the Gulf of Mexico to spray dispersants. More than half of the 1.1 million US gallons (4,200 m^{3}) of chemical dispersants were applied at the wellhead 5,000 feet (1,500 m) under the sea. This had never previously been tried but due to the unprecedented nature of this spill, BP along with the USCG and the EPA, decided to use "the first subsea injection of dispersant directly into oil at the source".

Dispersants are said to facilitate the digestion of the oil by microbes. Mixing the dispersants with the oil at the wellhead would keep some oil below the surface and in theory, allow microbes to digest the oil before it reached the surface. Various risks were identified and evaluated, in particular that an increase in the microbe activity might reduce the oxygen in the water. The use of dispersants at the wellhead was pursued and NOAA estimated that roughly 409,000 barrels (65,000 m^{3}) of oil were dispersed underwater.

By 12 July 2010, BP had reported applying 1.07 million US gallons (4,100 m^{3}) of Corexit on the surface and 721,000 US gallons (2,730 m^{3}) underwater (subsea). By 30 July 2010, more than 1.8 million US gallons (6,800 m^{3}) of dispersant had been used, mostly Corexit 9500.

Dispersant use was said to have stopped after the cap was in place. Marine toxicologist Riki Ott wrote an open letter to the EPA in late August with evidence that dispersant use had not stopped and that it was being administered near shore. Independent testing supported her claim. New Orleans-based attorney Stuart Smith, representing the Louisiana-based United Commercial Fisherman's Association and the Louisiana Environmental Action Network said he "personally saw C-130s applying dispersants from [his] hotel room in the Florida Panhandle. They were spraying directly adjacent to the beach right at dusk. Fishermen I've talked to say they've been sprayed. This idea they are not using this stuff near the coast is nonsense."

=== Environmental controversy over Corexit ===
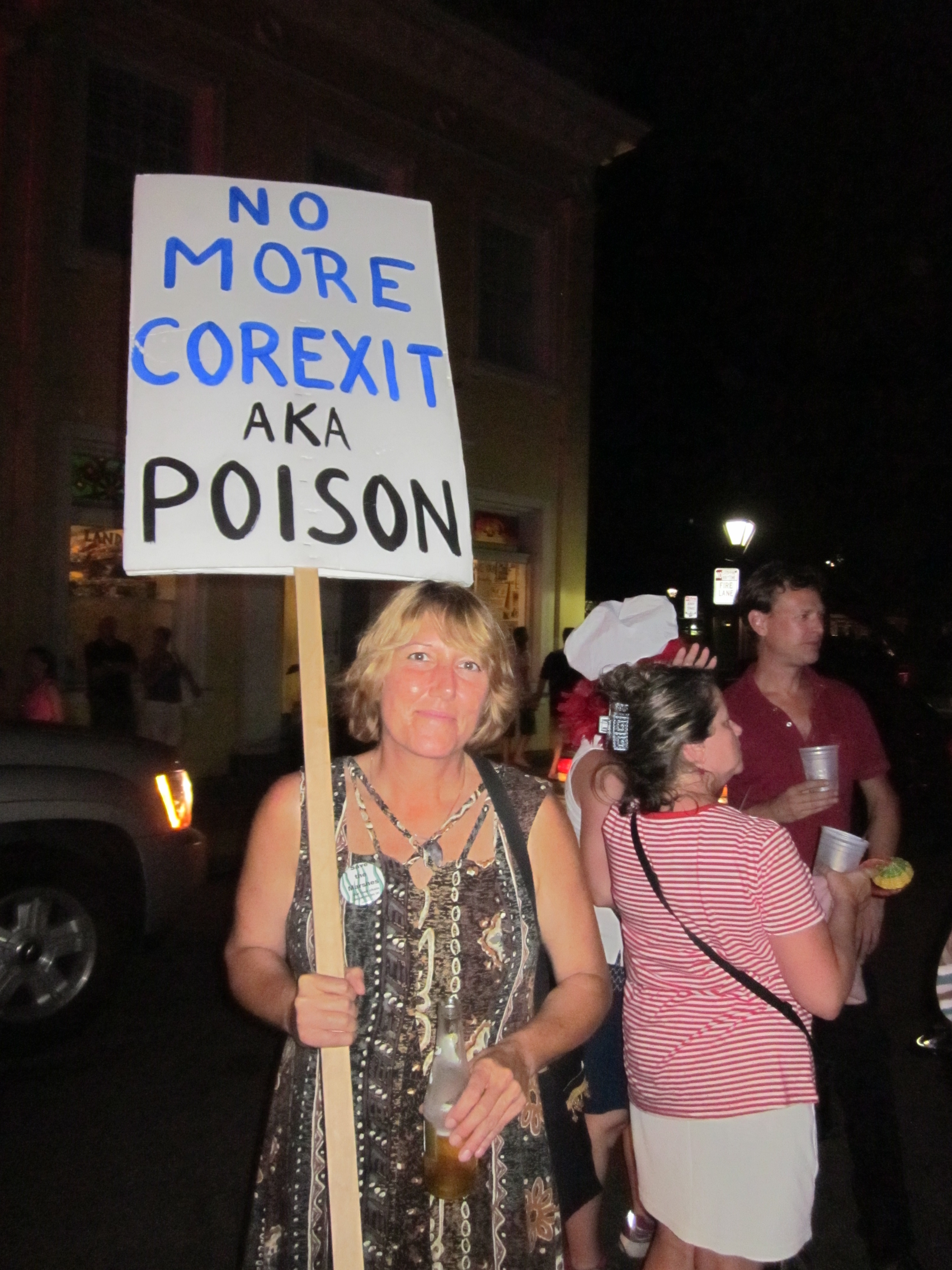
Sign protesting use of toxic Corexit chemical dispersant in the Deepwater Horizon oil spill, at the Bastille Day Tumble, French Quarter, New Orleans

Environmental scientists say the dispersants, which can cause genetic mutations and cancer, add to the toxicity of a spill, and expose sea turtles and bluefin tuna to an even greater risk than crude alone. The dangers are even greater for dispersants poured into the source of a spill, where they are picked up by the current and washed into the Gulf.

On 7 May 2010, Secretary Alan Levine of the Louisiana Department of Health and Hospitals, Louisiana Department of Environmental Quality Secretary Peggy Hatch, and Louisiana Department of Wildlife and Fisheries Secretary Robert Barham sent a letter to BP outlining their concerns related to potential dispersant impact on Louisiana's wildlife and fisheries, environment, aquatic life, and public health. Officials requested that BP release information on their dispersant effects. After three underwater tests the EPA approved the injection of dispersants directly at the leak site to break up the oil before it reached the surface.

In mid-May, independent scientists suggested that underwater injection of Corexit into the leak may have been responsible for the oil plumes discovered below the surface.

On 19 May, the EPA gave BP 24 hours to choose less toxic alternatives to Corexit from the list of dispersants on the National Contingency Plan Product Schedule and begin applying the new dispersant(s) within 72 hours of EPA approval or provide a detailed reasoning why the approved products did not meet the required standards.

On 20 May, US Polychemical Corporation reportedly received an order from BP for its Dispersit SPC 1000 dispersant. US Polychemical said that it could produce 20,000 US gallons (76 m^{3}) a day in the first few days, increasing up to 60,000 US gallons (230 m^{3}) a day thereafter. Also on 20 May, BP determined that none of the alternative products met all three criteria of availability, toxicity, and effectiveness. On 24 May, EPA Administrator Lisa Jackson ordered the EPA to conduct its own evaluation of alternatives and ordered BP to scale back dispersant use.

According to analysis of daily dispersant reports provided by the Deepwater Horizon Unified Command, before 26 May, BP used 25,689 US gallons per day (0.0011255 m^{3}/s) of Corexit. After the EPA directive, the daily average of dispersant use dropped to 23,250 US gallons per day (0.001019 m^{3}/s), a 9% decline.

The 12 July 2010 BP report listed available stocks of Corexit which decreased by over 965,000 US gallons (3,650 m^{3}) without reported application, suggesting either stock diversion or unreported application. Under reported subsea application of 1.69 million US gallons (6,400 m^{3}) would account for this discrepancy. Given the suggested dispersant to oil ratio between 1:10 and 1:50, the possible use of 1.69 million US gallons (6,400 m^{3}) in subsea application could be expected to suspend between 0.4 and 2 million barrels (64,000 and 318,000 m^{3}) of oil below the surface of the Gulf.

On 31 July, Rep. Edward Markey, Chairman of the House Energy and Environment Subcommittee, released a letter sent to National Incident Commander Thad Allen, and documents revealing that the USCG repeatedly allowed BP to use excessive amounts of the dispersant Corexit on the surface of the ocean. Markey's letter, based on an analysis conducted by the Energy and Environment Subcommittee staff, further showed that by comparing the amounts BP reported using to Congress to the amounts contained in the company's requests for exemptions from the ban on surface dispersants it submitted to the USCG, that BP often exceeded its own requests, with little indication that it informed the USCG, or that the USCG attempted to verify whether BP was exceeding approved volumes. "Either BP was lying to Congress or to the Coast Guard about how much dispersants they were shooting onto the ocean," said Markey.

On 2 August 2010, the EPA said dispersants did no more harm to the environment than the oil itself, and that they stopped a large amount of oil from reaching the coast by making the oil break down faster. However, independent scientists and EPA's own experts continue to voice concerns regarding the use of dispersants. According to a 2012 study, Corexit made the oil 52 times more toxic and allowed polycyclic aromatic hydrocarbons (PAHs) to more deeply penetrate beaches and possibly groundwater.

=== Long-term effects of Corexit ===
NOAA states that toxicity tests have suggested that the acute risk of dispersant-oil mixtures is no greater than that of oil alone. However, some experts believe that all the benefits and costs may not be known for decades. A study from Georgia Tech and Universidad Autonoma de Aguascalientes (UAA), Mexico reported in late 2012 that Corexit made the oil up to 52 times more toxic than oil alone. Additionally, the dispersant made oil sink faster and more deeply into the beaches, and possibly the groundwater.

University of South Florida scientists released preliminary results on the toxicity of microscopic drops of oil in the undersea plumes, finding that they may be more toxic than previously thought. The researchers say the dispersed oil appears to be negatively affecting bacteria and phytoplankton – the microscopic plants which make up the basis of the Gulf's food web. The field-based results were consistent with shore-based laboratory studies showing that phytoplankton are more sensitive to chemical dispersants than the bacteria, which are more sensitive to oil.

Because the dispersants were applied deep under the sea, much of the oil never rose to the surface – which means it went somewhere else, said Robert Diaz, a marine scientist at the College of William and Mary, "The dispersants definitely don't make oil disappear. They take it from one area in an ecosystem and put it in another," Diaz said. One plume of dispersed oil measured at 22 miles (35 km) long, more than a mile wide and 650 feet (200 m) thick. The plume showed the oil "is persisting for longer periods than we would have expected," said researchers with the Woods Hole Oceanographic Institution. "Many people speculated that subsurface oil droplets were being easily biodegraded. Well, we didn't find that. We found it was still there". In a major study on the plume, experts found the most worrisome part to be the slow pace at which the oil was breaking down in the cold, 40 °F (4 °C) water at depths of 3,000 feet (910 m) 'making it a long-lasting but unseen threat to vulnerable marine life'. Marine Sciences at the University of Georgia reported findings of a substantial layer of oily sediment stretching for dozens of miles in all directions from the capped well.

== Removal ==
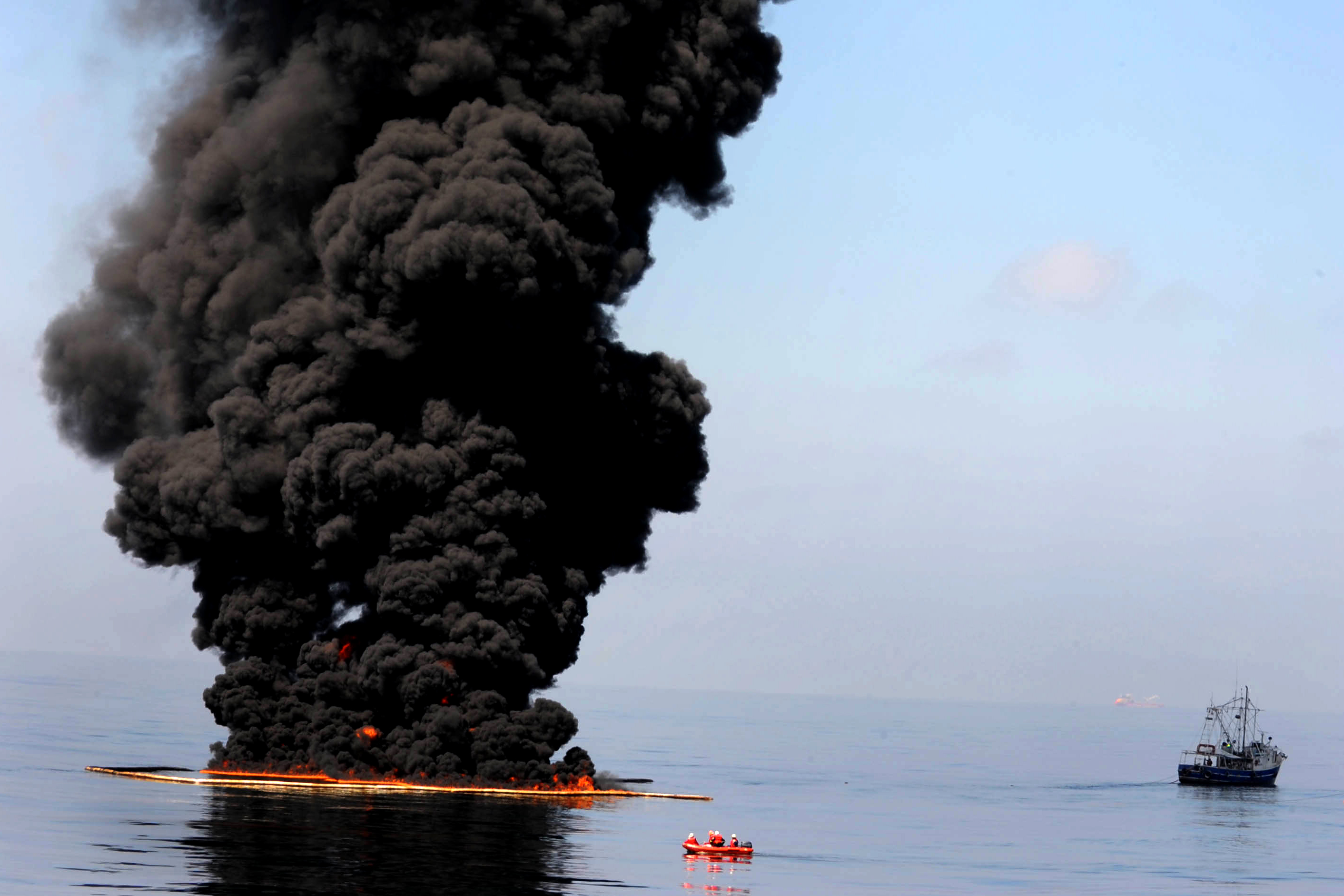
Dark clouds of smoke and fire emerge as oil burns during a controlled fire in the Gulf of Mexico, 6 May 2010.

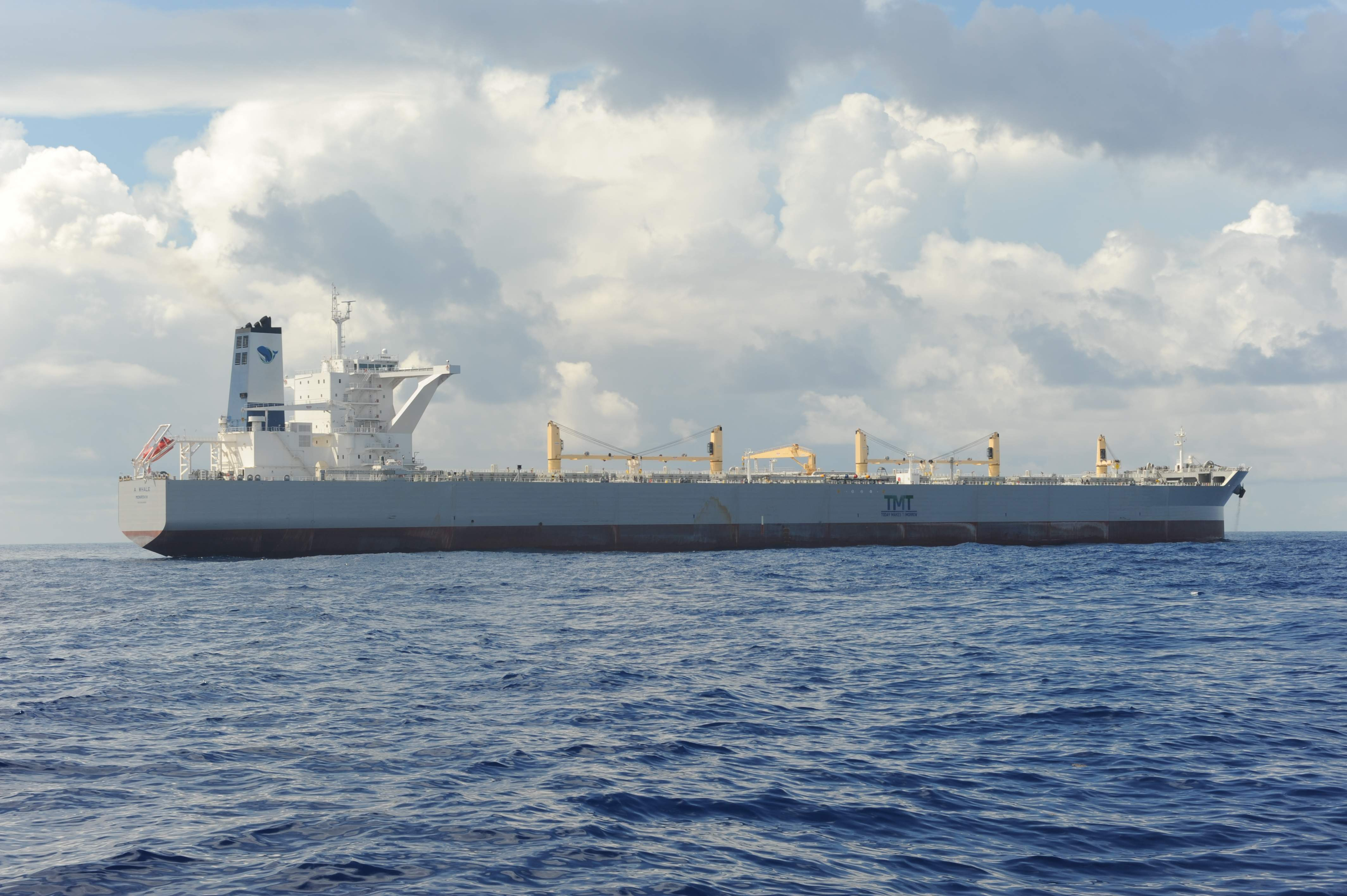
The Taiwanese retrofitted skimmer, A Whale

The three basic approaches for removing the oil from the water were: burning the oil, filtering offshore, and collecting for later processing. On 28 April 2010, the USCG announced plans to corral and burn off up to 1,000 barrels (160 m^{3}) of oil each day. In November 2010 the EPA reported that in-situ controlled burning removed as much as 13 million US gallons (49,000 m^{3}) of oil from the water. Another source gives the figure as 265,000 barrels (11,100,000 US gal; 42,100 m^{3}) of oil. There were 411 fires set between April and mid-July 2010 from which cancer-causing dioxins were released. The EPA stated that the release was minimal. A second research team concluded "there was only a small added risk of cancer to people breathing polluted air or eating tainted fish".

Oil was collected by using skimmers. More than 60 open-water skimmers were deployed, including 12 purpose-built vehicles. A Taiwanese supertanker, A Whale, was retrofitted after the Deepwater explosion for skimming large amounts of oil in the Gulf. The ship was tested in early July 2010 but failed to collect a significant amount of oil. Due to BP's use of Corexit the oil was too dispersed to collect, according to a spokesperson for shipowner TMT.

The EPA prohibited the use of skimmers that left more than 15 ppm of oil in the water. Many large-scale skimmers exceeded the limit. An urban myth developed that the U.S. government declined the offers from foreign countries because of the requirements of the Jones Act. This proved untrue and many foreign assets deployed to aid in cleanup efforts.

In mid June, BP ordered 32 machines that separate oil and water with each machine capable of extracting up to 2,000 barrels (320 m^{3}) per day, After testing machines for one week, BP decided to use the technology and by 28 June, had removed 890,000 barrels (141,000 m^{3}) of oily liquid. The USCG said 33,000,000 US gallons (120,000 m^{3}) of tainted water was recovered, with 5,000,000 US gallons (19,000 m^{3}) of that consisting of oil. BP said 826,800 barrels (131,450 m^{3}) had been recovered or flared.

=== Oil budget ===
The table below presents the NOAA estimates based on an estimated release of 4,900,000 barrels (780,000 m^{3}) of oil (the category "chemically dispersed" includes dispersal at the surface and at the wellhead; "naturally dispersed" was mostly at the wellhead; "residual" is the oil remaining as surface sheen, floating tarballs, and oil washed ashore or buried in sediment). However, there is plus or minus 10% uncertainty in the total volume of the spill.

Category	Estimate	Alternative 1	Alternative 2
Direct recovery from wellhead	17%	17%	17%
Burned at the surface	5%	5%	5%
Skimmed from the surface	3%	3%	3%
Chemically dispersed	8%	10%	6%
Naturally dispersed	16%	20%	12%
Evaporated or dissolved	25%	32%	18%
Residual remaining	26%	13%	39%

Two months after these numbers were released Carol Browner, director of the White House Office of Energy and Climate Change Policy, said they were "never meant to be a precise tool" and that the data "was simply not designed to explain, or capable of explaining, the fate of the oil. Oil that the budget classified as dispersed, dissolved, or evaporated is not necessarily gone".

Based on these estimates, up to 75% of the oil from BP's Gulf oil disaster still remained in the Gulf environment, according to Christopher Haney, chief scientist for Defenders of Wildlife, who called the government report's conclusions misleading. Haney reiterated "terms such as 'dispersed,' 'dissolved' and 'residual' do not mean gone. That's comparable to saying the sugar dissolved in my coffee is no longer there because I can't see it. By Director Lubchenco's own acknowledgment, the oil which is out of sight is not benign. "Whether buried under beaches or settling on the ocean floor, residues from the spill will remain toxic for decades."

Appearing before Congress, Bill Lehr, a senior scientist at NOAA's Office of Response and Restoration, defended a report written by the National Incident Command on the fate of the oil. The report relied on numbers generated by government and non-government oil spill experts, using an "Oil Budget Calculator" (OBC) developed for the spill. Based upon the OBC, Lehr said 6% was burned and 4% was skimmed but he could not be confident of numbers for the amount collected from beaches. As seen in the table above, he pointed out that much of the oil has evaporated or been dispersed or dissolved into the water column. Under questioning from congressman Ed Markey, Lehr agreed that the report said the amount of oil that went into the Gulf was 4.1 million barrels (650×10^{3} m^{3}), noting that 800,000 barrels (130,000 m^{3}) were siphoned off directly from the well.

NOAA was criticized by some independent scientists and Congress for the report's conclusions and for failing to explain how the scientists arrived at the calculations detailed in the table above. Ian MacDonald, an ocean scientist at Florida State University (FSU), claimed the NIC report "was not science". He accused the White House of making "sweeping and largely unsupported" claims that 3/4 of the oil in the Gulf was gone and called the report "misleading". "The imprint will be there in the Gulf of Mexico for the rest of my life. It is not gone and it will not go away quickly", he concluded.

A formally peer-reviewed report documenting the OBC was scheduled for release in early October. Markey told Lehr the NIC report had given the public a false sense of confidence. "You shouldn't have released it until you knew it was right," he said.

By late July, two weeks after the flow of oil had stopped, oil on the surface of the Gulf had largely dissipated but concern still remained for underwater oil and ecological damage.

Markus Huettel, a benthic ecologist at FSU who has been studying the spill since 2010, maintains that while much of BP's oil was degraded or evaporated, as least 60% remains unaccounted for. Huettel cautions that only one category from NOAA's "oil budget", the 17% directly recovered from the wellhead, is actually known. "All the other categories, like oil burned, skimmed, chemically dispersed, or evaporated, are guesses that could change by a factor or two or even more in some cases". Huettel stressed that even after much research, some categories, like how much oil was dispersed at depth, will never be accurately known. "That oil is somewhere, but nobody knows where, and nobody knows how much has settled on the seafloor."

== Oil eating microbes ==
Several studies suggest that bacteria have consumed some of the oil in the sea. In August 2010, a study of bacterial activity in the Gulf led by Terry Hazen of the Lawrence Berkeley National Laboratory, found a previously unknown bacterial species and reported in the journal Science that it was able to break down the oil without depleting oxygen levels. Hazen's interpretation had its skeptics. John Kessler, a chemical oceanographer at Texas A&M University says "what Hazen was measuring was a component of the entire hydrocarbon matrix," which is a mix of thousands of different molecules. Although the few molecules described in the new paper in Science may well have degraded within weeks, Kessler says, "there are others that have much longer half-lives – on the order of years, sometimes even decades." He noted that the missing oil has been found in the form of large oil plumes, one the size of Manhattan, which do not appear to be biodegrading very fast.

By mid-September, research showed these microbes mainly digested natural gas spewing from the wellhead – propane, ethane, and butane – rather than oil, according to a subsequent study. David L. Valentine, a professor of microbial geochemistry at UC Santa Barbara, said that the oil-gobbling properties of the microbes had been grossly overstated. Methane was the most abundant hydrocarbon released during the spill. It has been suggested that vigorous deepwater bacterial bloom respired nearly all the released methane within 4 months, leaving behind a residual microbial community containing methanotrophic bacteria.

Some experts suggested that the oil eating bacteria may have caused health issues for residents of the Gulf. Local physicians noted an outbreak of mysterious skin rashes which, according to marine toxicologist Riki Ott, could be the result of proliferation of the bacteria in Gulf waters. In order to eat the oil faster, oil eating bacteria such as Alcanivorax borkumensis have been genetically modified. Ott claims to have spoken with numerous residents and tourists of the Gulf who have experienced symptoms like rashes and "peeling palms" after contact with the water in the Gulf.

== Cleanup ==
On 15 April 2014, BP claimed that cleanup along the coast was substantially complete, but the United States Coast Guard responded that a lot of work remained. Nearly ten years after the disaster, it was reported that BP and oil companies alike are now more serious about the threat of contamination.

== Aftermath ==
The damages of the oil spill had both environmental and economic consequences. The Gulf was exposed to 775 million liters of oil that affected, not only wildlife, but also employment. Tourism decreased, seafood was considered contaminated, and some respected businesses shut down. Recovery was recorded to cost tens of billions of dollars. To make matters worse, recovery efforts by government officials were targeted toward surface level spill instead of deepwater spills, diminished the efficacy of the disaster response. It was recorded in one study a death estimation of 250,000 seabirds, 2,800 otters, 300 harbor seals, 250 bald eagles, up to 22 killer whales, and billions of salmon and herring eggs. These species were so effected by the spill that 10 years later, researchers still stress the importance to keeping these animals on the front line of recovery efforts.

People from Louisiana, Mississippi, Florida, Texas, Alabama, and those living in the Gulf of Mexico among others came to help with the initial ecological response. They worked toward removing oil and tar from beaches and offshore surrounding areas, creating boarders around the spill to keep the surface oil from spreading, using sorbents to absorb the oil, and burning the oil away. One study estimated that 5 to 6 percent of the oil from the Deepwater Horizon spill was burned into the atmosphere. More recovery methods included military efforts. The U.S. Air Force was delegated to release dispersants to break down the oil so it can mix with water more easily. However, it is believed that scientists did not feel this method helped effectively. (For more information about the aftermath of the explosion see Deepwater Horizon oil spill.)

== External links and further reading ==
- THE STORY OF THE LOUISIANA BERMS PROJECT Draft of Staff Working Paper No. 8 National Commission on the BP Deepwater Horizon Oil Spill and Offshore Drilling
- Document prepared by the Army Corps of Engineers detailing the emergency permit issued May 27, 2010
- "Under Pressure to Block Oil, A Rush To Dubious Projects" opinion by Rob Young in Yale Environment 360 3 June 2010, accessed 19 July 2010
- Blog post including photographs of berm erosion lacoastpost.com
