= Unified command =

Unified command may refer to:

- United Nations Command
- Unified Combatant Command (United States Department of Defense)
- sub-unified command (Joint service subordinate command of a Unified Combatant Command)
- Unified Command (ICS), U.S. federal government incident command system
- Unified Command (Deepwater Horizon oil spill), command system in the Deepwater Horizon oil spill
