= A Whale =

A Whale may refer to:

- A Whale (ship), a Liberian-flagged ore-oil carrier
- A Whale (film), 2024
