= Fossil fuel regulations in the United States =

Rules governing coal, oil and gas in the North American country

Fossil fuel regulations are part of the energy policy in the United States and have gained major significance with the nation's strong dependence on fossil fuel-based energy. Regulatory processes are established at the federal and state level due to the immense economic, socio-political and environmental impact of fossil fuel extraction and production. Over 80% of the United States' energy comes from fossil fuels such as coal, natural gas, and oil. The Bush administration was marked by the Energy Policy Act of 2005, which provided a monetary incentive for renewable energy adoption and addressed the issue of climate change. The Obama administration was made up of advocates for renewable energy and natural gas, while Donald Trump built his campaign on promises to revive the coal industry.

Oil, gas, and coal companies have been at odds with policy makers who have supported a wider implementation of renewable energy, with the former often spending millions of dollars to lobby against cleaner energy. On February 22, 2017 The Washington Post reported Scott Pruitt's potential conflicts of interest regarding the fossil fuel industry as he began his term as the appointed head of the EPA as part of the Trump administration. Fossil fuel emission disproportionately affects working class, poor and minority populations. The people most adversely affected also have the least political influence and least access to health care.

== Phase out regulations ==
The term "phasing out" describes the gradual decrease in dependence on using fossil fuels as a major source of energy in the United States. Since the Obama administration, there has been a nationwide push to move from fossil fuels to green alternatives. A gradual move towards renewable energy, such as wind and solar, has led to a decline in the use of fossil fuels because of their contribution to greenhouse gases. Reasons for this shift include lower costs for natural gas, Cap-and-trade policies, and a carbon tax in some areas of the country.

=== Resistance against phase out regulations ===
For much of the United States' history, fossil fuels have been a major energy source. While phasing out these fossil fuels will benefit the world climate in the long run, little has been done to stop burning fossil fuels and emitting CO_{2} into the atmosphere. If the United States effectively phases out fossil fuels, tons of energy in the form of oil, coal, and natural gas will be left untouched under the surface of the ground. Although this energy source is limited, companies and workers continue to drill into the Earth to extract it all.

=== Phasing out during the Obama administration ===
In August 2015, President Obama and his administration passed legislation to cut emissions from coal power plants. The goal of this legislation is to become more dependent on clean energy such as wind and solar power. The Environmental Protection Agency (EPA) set a benchmark of reducing CO_{2} emissions by 32% by 2030 from their 2005 levels. This plan and end goal became known as the Clean Power Plan.

=== Company and worker response ===
The main issue in dealing with the fossil fuel phase-out has been job loss. Companies in the fossil fuel industry have begun to experience the effects of the phasing-out of fossil fuels like coal. For example, Consol Energy, originally a coal-producing company, has begun the transition to becoming a natural gas producer. Not only does this shift affect its current role in the coal industry but it also has led to employment cuts. With the shuttering of coal plants, the National Rural Electric Cooperative Association estimates that over one million jobs will be lost. With the coal industry aging, many coal mines are deteriorating and becoming costly to keep running. As a result, coal plants are no longer a reliable, go-to energy source for the United States.

=== Controversies (within the Trump administration) ===
Many of Donald Trump's nominees for positions within his cabinet dispute proven facts about climate change. They include Scott Pruitt for the head of the EPA who as an Oklahoma attorney general repeatedly sued the EPA over its rules. Since becoming the head of the EPA, Pruitt has been running on an agenda solely concerned to bring jobs to the coal mining industry despite many of these mines having violated legislation protecting the environment (e.g. the Clean Water Act). Following the United Nations Climate Treaty, signed by 200 nations in 2015, Trump's actions are a distinct step backwards from phasing out fossil fuels. Most notably, on March 28, 2017, Trump signed the Energy Independence Executive Order designed to get rid of the Clean Power Plan initiated by President Obama. As a result, any previous action and steps taken to stop climate change will not be sustained. Trump has also promised to bring back the coal industry despite most greenhouse gases coming from coal-based power plants.

== Oil regulations ==
The majority of oil and gas regulations in the United States determine at what points in the processing procedure different organizations can claim ownership of the material. Regulations tend to state that whoever owns land has ownership of resources there. States and eventually the federal government then have authority over the areas over which they have jurisdiction. The Occupational Safety and Health Administration within the U.S. Department of Labor is in charge of regulating oil extraction. The oil industry in the United States is run by a series of privately owned companies.

=== Concerns and related regulations ===
==== Oil spills ====
The National Oceanic and Atmospheric Administration within the United States Department of Commerce developed a graphic of the largest oil spills impacting U.S. waters up since 1969. Since 2000, the largest spill has been the Deepwater Horizon oil spill of 2010. With the exception of Kalamazoo River (2010), all other major spills have occurred around the Gulf of Mexico.

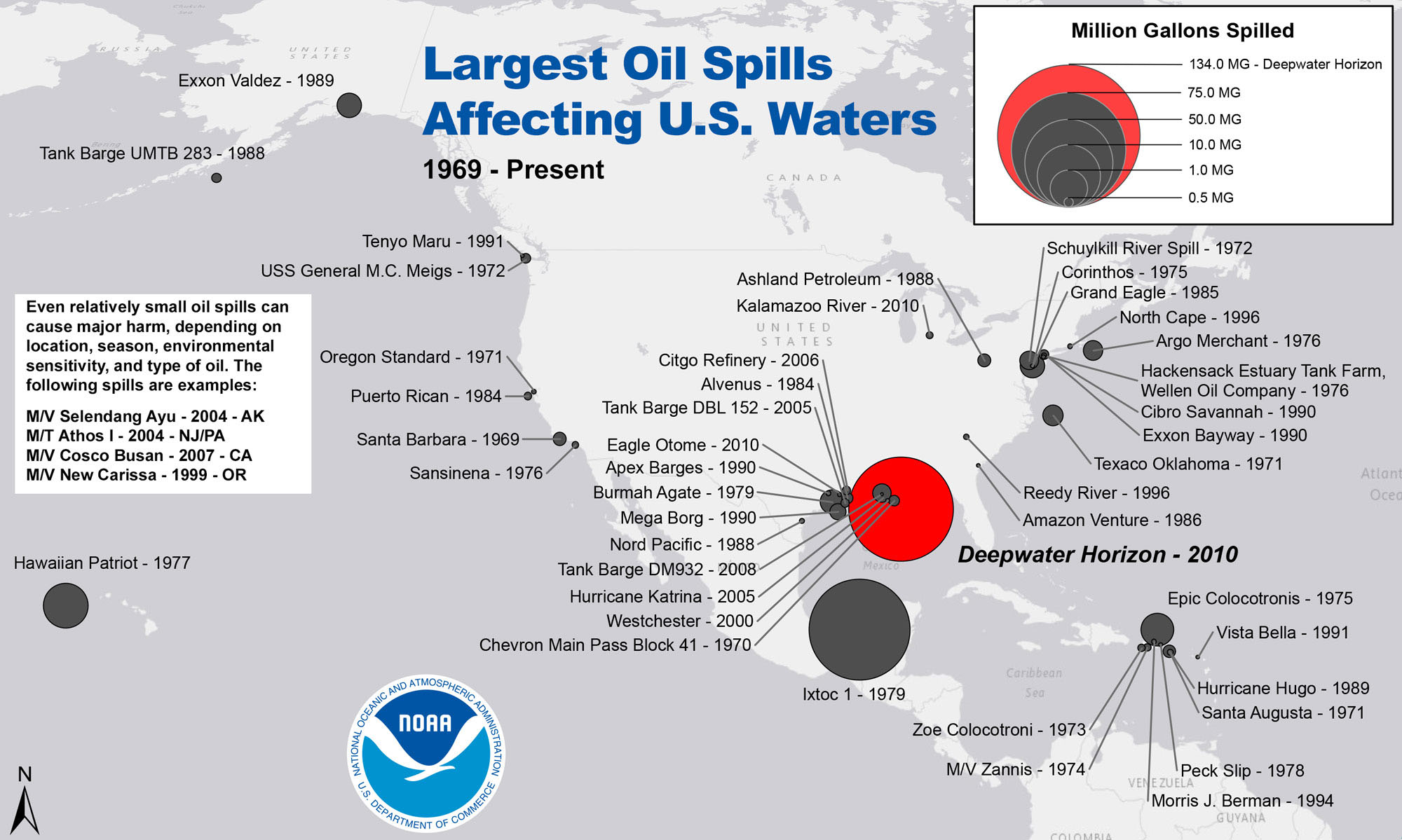
Map of the largest oil spills in U.S. waters since 1969

In May 2010, the United States Department of the Interior called for an end to drilling in the area of the Deepwater Horizon oil spill. Despite pushback from oil companies and states, the Supreme Court ruled to keep the moratorium in place until October 2010. BP agreed to financial compensation for the damage they caused, including payouts to the Deepwater Horizon Oil Spill Trust. Regulations drafted after the accident required oil companies to update their safety equipment, including blowout preventers. This measure was criticized as too costly to integrate and thus harmful to industry and job growth, so it has been weakly enforced.

Despite actions taken, the region has been slow to recover. During the moratorium, there was a decrease in employment in the oil industry along the Florida Coast and a net increase in employment in Louisiana, which also received more concern from the oil industry. Coastal areas were impacted economically more than inland areas. The Louisiana fishing industry was shown to still be damaged by the spill years after it had occurred. Oyster numbers in particular have dropped significantly in the region. Other at risk species used as sustenance include speckled trout, crabs, and mullet. Due to proximity to the spill site, Louisiana bore the brunt of clean up efforts. BP decided on the oil dissolving chemical Corexit which was shown by the United States Environmental Protection Agency to be neither the most or least toxic option. Criticisms of the use of the chemical included health impacts on humans, such as headaches, vomiting, and reproductive problems.

The Kalamazoo River oil spill, the first major dilbit spill, occurred in June 2010 in Calhoun County, Michigan, and led to "the largest on-land spill in American history" at the time. The pipeline company Enbridge promised to improve safety measures and agreed to pay $177 million to resolve their violations of the Clean Water Act and Oil Pollution Act including additional fines to cover other spills and clean-up costs after an investigation by the U.S. Department of Justice and the Environmental Protection Agency. Although Enbridge purchased 148 houses plus land and mobile homes along the spill route, some residents did not return to the area. The County Director of Emergency management believed "the majority of people living along the river won't be impacted by the settlement." The city of Battle Creek, Michigan sits in the middle of the area where damage from the spill occurred; 21.7% of its population is below the poverty line compared to 17.5% for Calhoun County and 18.3% for Kalamazoo County where the oil eventually flowed. The percentage of the population of Michigan below the poverty line is 16.7%. Under section 311(c) of the Clean Water Act, the EPA was able to order Enbridge to finish cleaning up the oil spill. Although no specific regulations for dilbit oil have been proposed, in 2013 when plans for the Keystone XL Pipeline were being developed, the EPA recommended that the State Department “include means to address the additional risks of releases that may be greater for spills of dilbit than other crudes” in response to the damages caused by the Kalamazoo River oil spill. Dilbit oil more readily evaporates from the surface of water than normal crude oil, and after this evaporation occurs the remaining product sinks faster.

==== Oil workers' rights ====
The Occupational Safety and Health Administration within the U.S. Department of Labor sets the requirements oil companies must abide by for the treatment of their employees; among them, that "employers provide their employees with safe and healthful workplaces", and that the employer must be held responsible should an employee be denied their rights. Title VII of the Civil Rights Act of 1964, which prevents a company from not hiring someone on the basis of race, sex, religion, or national origin applies to oil rig workers. Because oil rig workers can be working outside where OSHA has jurisdiction within mainland U.S., state or maritime laws may apply instead in cases of unemployment, security checks, and safety regulations with responsibilities falling on the Transportation Security Administration, FBI, Bureau of Ocean Energy Management, and the U.S. Coast Guard. The United Steelworkers union also advocates for employees of the oil industry.

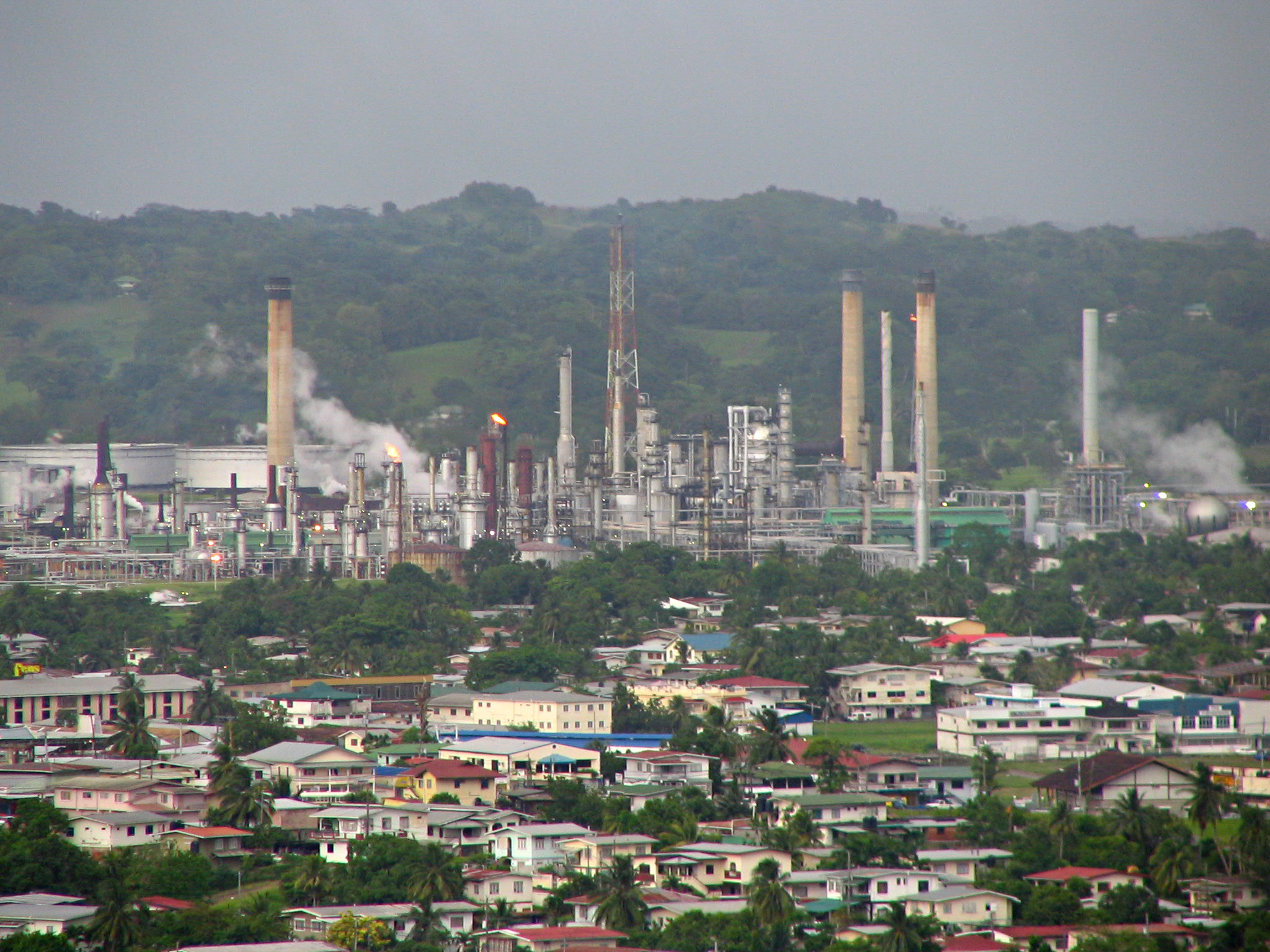
Pointe-à-Pierre refinery and fenceline community

As of 2015, there is no stringent enforcement of overtime or hazard pay. Workers have also complained about the lax attitude of refineries toward the improvement of safety measures and equipment resulting in the 2015 United Steel Workers Oil Refinery strike. An agreement was eventually reached to determine more standardized safety regulations and to improve pay and health care costs. Such safety regulations are also important for fenceline communities which are disproportionately impacted by the pollution generated by refining facilities and in which people of color tend to be the majority. There has also been a historic precedence of siting refineries in existing communities of color. A bill introduced in 2006 was passed by the House of Representatives with the intent to expedite the siting process of states by offering federal assistance in the form of "expertise in fields relevant to consideration of federal refinery authorizations".

==== Pipelines ====
Pipelines are an economical way to transport large volumes of petroleum products. The Pipeline and Hazardous Materials Safety Administration within the U.S. Department of Transportation is responsible for enforcing pipeline transport regulations at the federal level. Regulations cover the hazardous materials transported as well as the safety of the pipeline itself. A series of pipeline safety acts have been passed over the years including the Pipeline Safety Improvement act of 2002; The Pipeline Safety, Regulatory Certainty, and Job Creation Act of 2011; and the Protecting our Infrastructure of Pipelines and Enhancing Safety (PIPES) Act of 2016. Individual states have varying regulations for the transport of oil into and out of state boundaries, which limits where pipelines can be built.

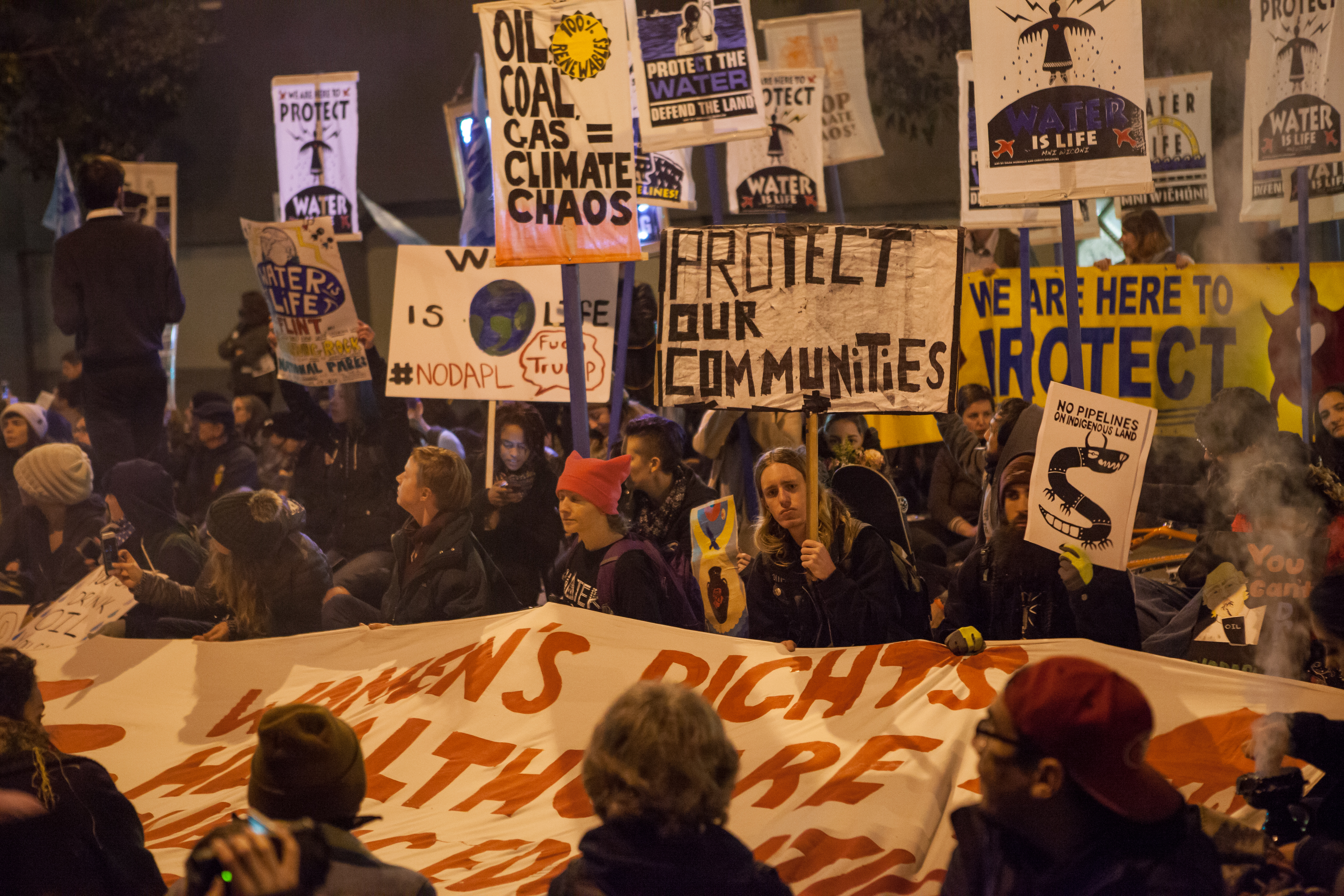
Protest against Dakota Access and Keystone XL pipelines

As more pipelines are built, oil companies profits and investments into these companies continue to increase. A decrease in material costs outweighs the net increase in cost of construction. The increase in construction costs results largely from increased labor and permitting costs. Supporters of pipeline transport cite the potential for job creation, with the greatest being in construction. Estimates for job growth vary, and some are found to be exaggerated. Little evidence has also been found to support the idea that oil prices will either stabilize or decrease once pipelines are constructed.

Critics of pipeline transport of oil cite environmental and land rights issues. Protests over the Keystone XL Pipeline beginning in 2011 and Dakota Access Pipeline have expressed these same concerns. Native peoples have been active protesters. The Standing Rock Sioux of South Dakota opposed the construction plans of the Dakota Access Pipeline because it ran through a symbolically significant area, and expressed concern that it could compromise their source of drinking water. Since pipelines have been built, multiple pipeline accidents have occurred, resulting in oil spills and the contamination of the surrounding environment. The tribe was also not involved in planning the route for the pipeline. These protests also reflect the ongoing struggle for Native American recognition in the United States. In November 2015 President Barack Obama called to stop construction of the Keystone XL Pipeline. In December 2016 the Army Corps of Engineers prevented further construction on the pipeline near the Standing Rock Reservation. On January 24, 2017 President Donald Trump signed an executive order permitting the completion of both the Keystone XL Pipeline and Dakota Access Pipeline. On March 24, 2017 the permit was granted.

== Coal regulations ==
Along with other fossil fuels, coal is a major energy resource for the U.S. Most of the energy supplied by coal production is consumed by the electric power sector. Due to competition with renewable energy and natural gas, coal production has been declining since 2008. Currently the U.S. occupies five major basins or regions where coal is produced. The U.S. Energy Information Administration released coal production data of 2016 in January, reporting a 17% decrease from 2015 levels. As coal is projected to remain a key energy resource, regulations concerning environmental pollution increase.

=== Concerns and related regulations ===
==== Pollution from stationary sources ====
The Environmental Protection Administration monitors and controls the emissions from coal-fired power plants to ensure public health and air quality. Coal production and consumption generates various environmental impacts such as the release of greenhouse gases. There are around 1,100 major electric power plants, which are subject to New Source Review (NSR) and Prevention of Significant Deterioration (PSD). Emissions from these plants have the largest contributions of sulfur dioxide (SO2) and nitrogen oxides (NOx) into the atmosphere. Facilities in the electric sector are restricted to emission standards defined by the Clean Air Act (United States).

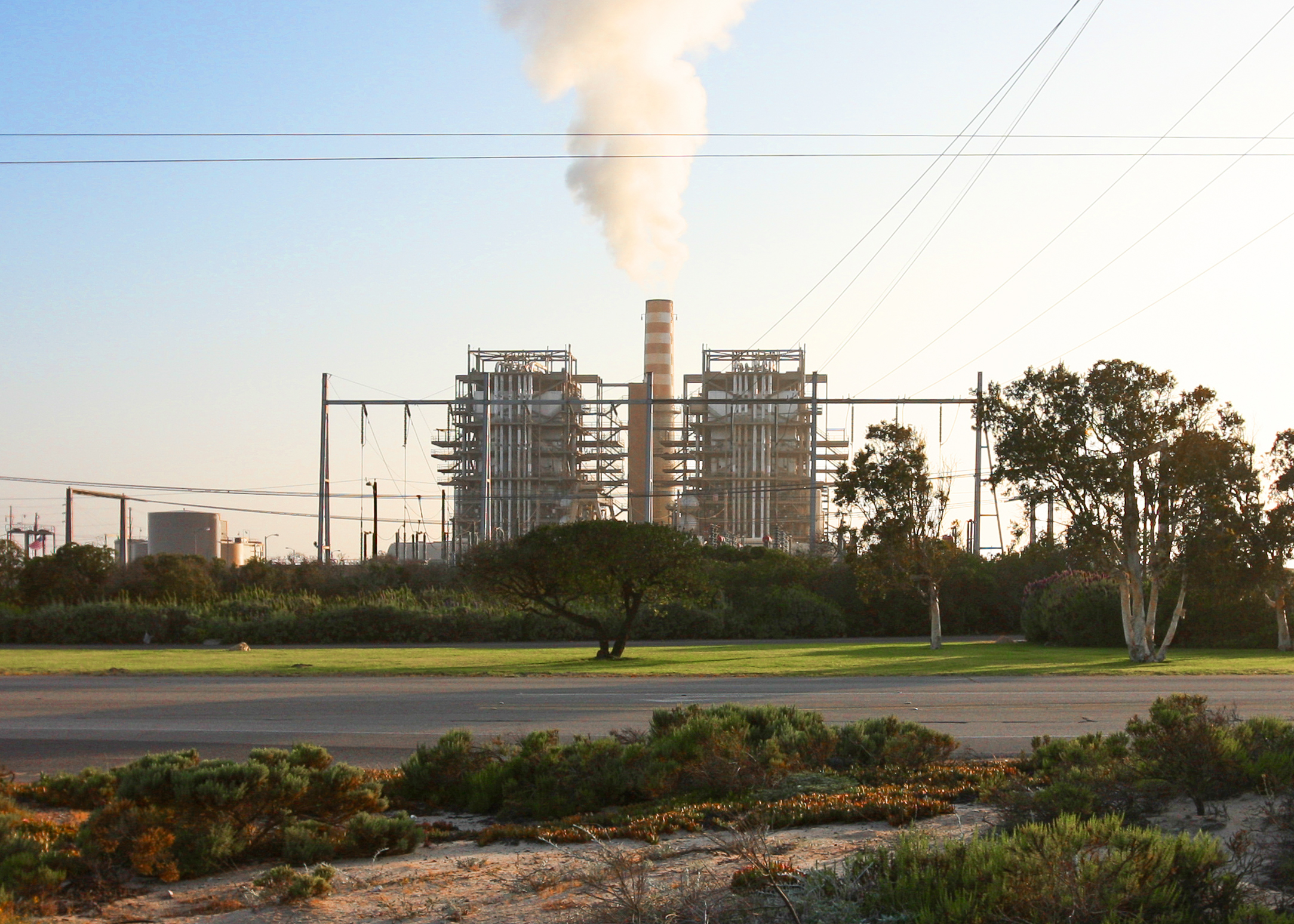
A coal fired power plant

While monitoring and controlling environmental releases of plants has been difficult, the EPA has been enforcing their policies regarding air quality over the last decade under President Barack Obama. While the Clean Air Act postulates regulations and rules limiting the emissions of greenhouse gases, other laws are concerned with standards of power plants and initiatives to enforce these laws have been formed. The impacts of mining are diverse and have possible negative effects for humans and the biosphere. Among these are acid mine drainage, subsidence and mine workers' health risks, to prevent which there are regulations regarding mining practices like strip mining. Even though regulations seek to address environmental impacts, they often do not provide remedy for the social and health disparities created by exposure to emissions from electric power plants.

Methods of extraction have developed over the last decade to make coal extraction more efficient. With more advanced technologies, the environmental burdens become larger with increased emissions of particulate matter and acid rain deposition linked to coal mining.

==== Controversies ====
With the administration of President Donald Trump, environmental regulations concerning coal mining are set to be eased. An executive order was proposed in February 2017 to reverse the Stream Protection Rule that aims at protecting nearby waters from surface mining debris. Trump's support for this move comes from his interest in the fossil fuel industry and from an incentive to reactivate the coal industry in the US, which has been on a consistent decline from competition of renewables and natural gas. The repeal of President Obama's Stream Protection Rule could possibly endanger species by polluting ecosystems and thereby harming biodiversity. Ecological effects of coal mining include contamination of water, destruction of habitats, leaching, soil erosion and subsidence.

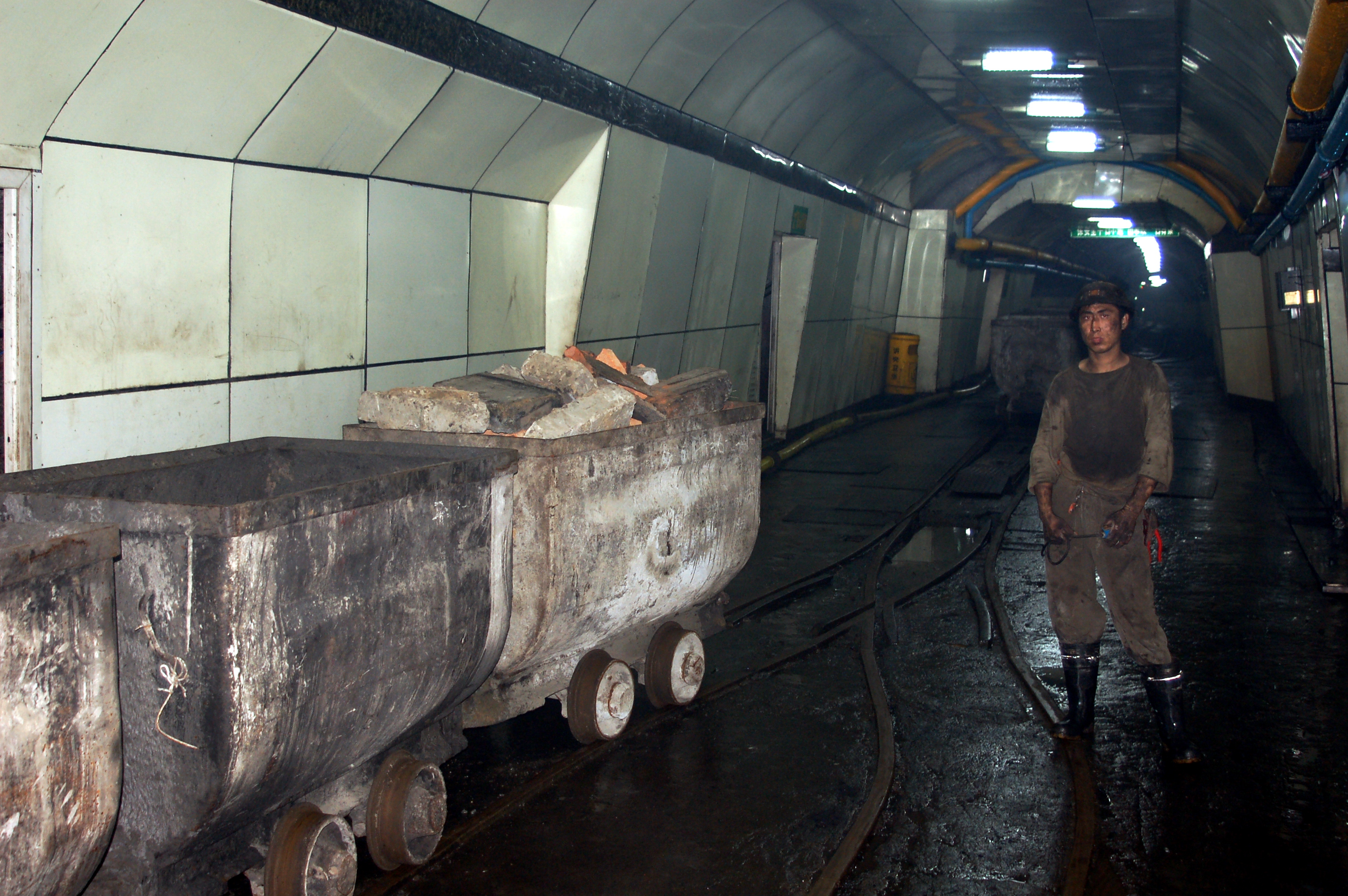
A coal miner

Further, on March 28, 2017, Trump signed an executive order to rewrite President Barack Obama's Clean Power Plan. Much of this incentive is driven by expanding the workforce in the coal industry, however it is still undetermined how soon this will take effect. With continued trends in repealing past rules and regulations regarding Climate change under the Trump administration, the commitment to the Paris climate agreement held at the 2015 United Nations Climate Change Conference is under question. Uncertainty about the development of this debate sparks much global controversy and unclarity in the reactions and future prognoses of climate and environmental politics. While international concerns are expressed, economists do not think that the proposed repeals will have much effect. Demand for coal on the national market has been declining and is still low, so that changes to the pollution standards and greenhouse gas emissions do not actually change the market drastically.

== Natural gas regulations ==
=== Increased use in the U.S. ===
Natural gas was first discovered in the United States in 1626, when the French explorers found Native Americans setting gas on fire that leaked into Lake Erie. In 1816, the U.S. first lighted the streets of Baltimore, Maryland. Then in 1821, the first successful natural gas well was dug in Fredonia, New York, which allowed for the American natural gas distribution company to be built there in 1858. And then in 1836, the first city-owned natural gas distribution company was created in Philadelphia, Pennsylvania. While during the 1800s, natural gas was used mainly for lighting streets and homes, the creation of pipelines in the 1900s allowed for extensive use of it in home appliances, manufacturing plants, and boilers.

Due to an increased population, increased per capita consumption, and increased standard of living, there has been drastically more energy consumption internationally. From the 2000s forward, there was a sharp increase in the production, use, trade, and advocacy of natural gas especially in the United States for several reasons. As of now, natural gas is the most domestically abundant fossil fuel in this country, and therefore considered the most affordable option in this country. It is so abundant because horizontal drilling and hydraulic fracturing have helped access natural gas from previously unavailable gas deposits. It is also considered the world's cleanest fossil fuel because it generates the least air pollution and releases the least carbon dioxide per unit of energy than oil or coal. It is also seen as a “bridge fuel” between carbon-intensive coal and oil to a renewable energy future. Another reason for the sudden increased use of natural gas is the decrease in oil production and increase in oil prices as well as the increase in regulation and legislation of coal.

The industry has also extensively publicized itself. They have done this by first drilling in the sites that would have the best results so that later they could apply this to more critical sites. The energy sector, needing to come up with new sources of energy for the future, embraced natural gas unquestioningly. Also environmental organizations that were trying to get the government to cut carbon emissions but didn't want to call for complete energy cutbacks, settled for advocating natural gas use as a "bridge fuel" into a renewable future.

Global demand for energy is supposed to increase by 50% in 20 years, and specifically that for natural gas is supposed to increase by 70% in 20 years. Actually about 30% of energy consumed in America comes from natural gas and 93% of that natural gas consumed comes from within the U.S.

=== Natural gas industry in the U.S. ===
In the 90's the U.S. initially started using more natural gas because new technology was able to lower its generation costs and pipeline expansion was able to increase its availability. Then under the Presidency of George W. Bush (2000-2008), a combination of factors led to a growth in the natural gas industry. Bush passed the Energy Policy Act in 2005, that exempted chemicals used in hydraulic fracturing from the Safe Water Drinking Act, which means more places were being fracked. Starting around the same time hydraulic fracturing and horizontal drilling became more widely used since they made shale energy reserves more accessible. The industry pushed to drill more natural gas in more places, because they believed that they had the technology, expertise, and need as well as the fact that tremendous energy and profit could be made from more sites. However, until this day 94% of the country's offshore acreage has not been made available to energy development, despite requests from the natural gas industry.

This has all allowed for the United States to become the world's leading oil and natural gas producer since 2009, when it surpassed Russia. This has caused more economic growth and energy security because less imported oil means less dependence, and more exported natural gas means more profit and ties to more countries. During Barack Obama's Presidency (2008-2016) he attempted to focus on domestic energy production and use. At first he had called natural gas the "cornerstone" in his administration's “Blueprint for a Secure Energy Future”. It wasn't until severe public outlash and large demonstrations from mainstream media and environmental groups that Obama released a Climate Action Plan in 2013. This plan attempted to cut greenhouse gas emissions, cut carbon emissions, and cut methane emissions from oil and gas production. He also released a National Climate Change Assessment, took part in the Paris Climate Agreement, and allowed for higher EPA regulations that regulated fossil fuels, including natural gas production. During this time period natural gas production decreased on federal lands; however, it spiked on private lands, which meant it was not losing momentum, unlike coal, any time soon.

The election of Donald Trump (2017) has coincided with the country's attempt at globalization with increasing pipeline exports and LNG shipments. He also has plans to revive the fossil fuel industry with his America First Energy Plan. In respect to natural gas, this plan will attempt to “take advantage of the estimated $50 trillion in untapped shale, oil, and natural gas reserves, especially those on federal lands that the American people own.” However, even though Trump plans on opening some of these lands closed to drilling, analysts believe that this would not only be difficult with all the regulation but also would not increase revenue as much Trump believes it would. Trump also plans on eliminating Obama's Climate Action Plan and all its regulations.

=== Natural gas controversies ===
==== Environmental controversies ====
There have been several controversies in the natural gas industry. As natural gas use and production as well as fracking have increased, the environmental and human health risks associated with it have become more apparent, which has made people doubt the cleanliness of the process.

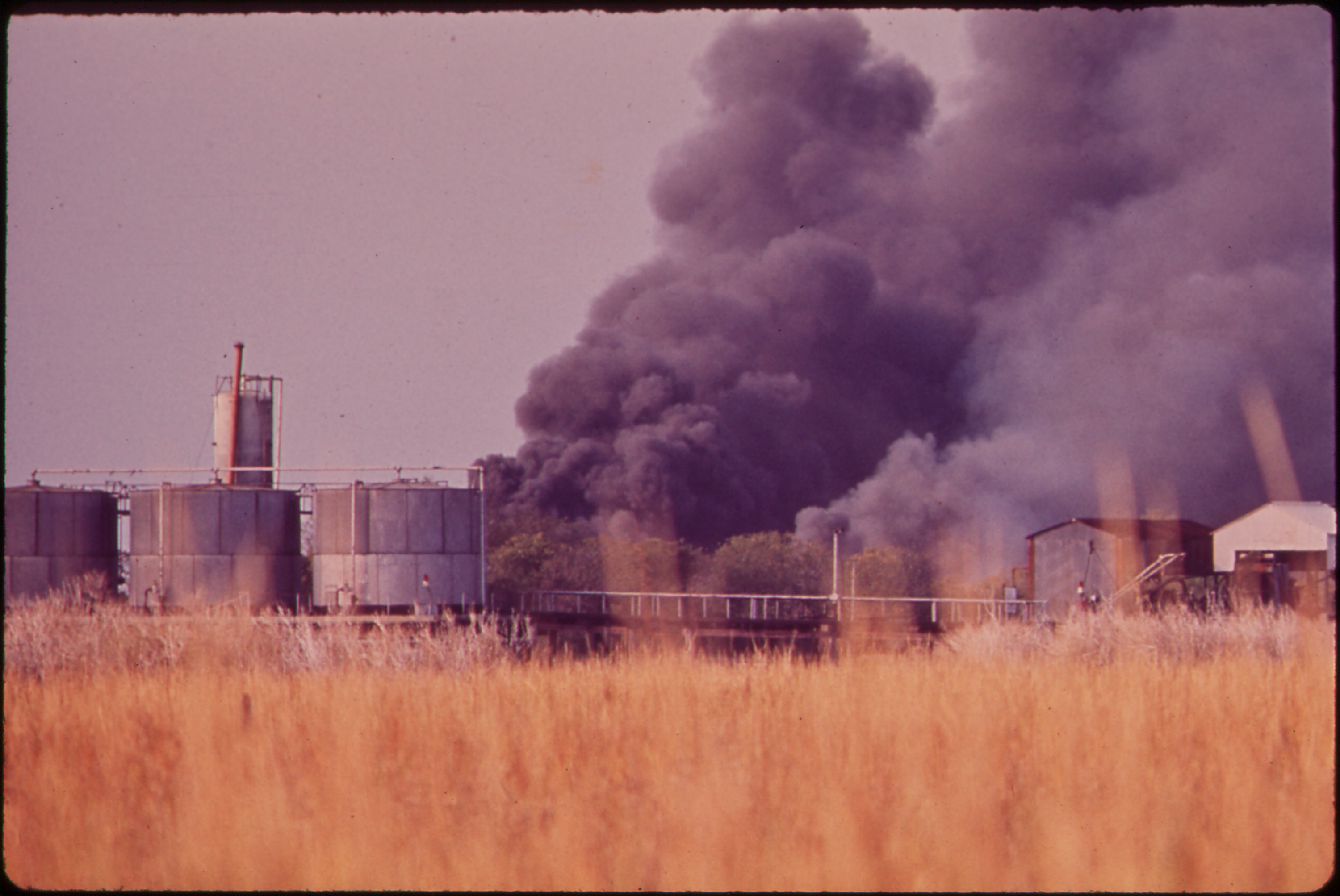
Natural gas facility

Drilling has increased two out of six “criteria” pollutants (particulate matter and ozone) that the EPA regulates due to their negative impacts. People who come in contact with these air pollutants can have severe health problems such as respiratory issues, cardiovascular disease, and cancer. A study has found that people within half a mile from a gas well site were more likely to have health problems from air pollution than people living farther.

Drilling also risks contaminating surface water and groundwater, which harms people drinking from those water sources. This contamination happens when hazardous chemicals from the drilling process leak into the water, when processing and refining the gas leave residue, and when disposal of waste water nearby pollutes the land. These chemicals can be radioactive materials, methane, other gases, and carcinogenic chemicals. However, the industry has countered than this contamination is the result of bad practice and not of a bad industry.

Drilling harms ecosystems because a drilling site is accompanied by construction, land disturbance, and land clearing. This causes erosion of not only dirt but also of other harmful pollutants. And drilling also fragments the wildlife's habitat and migration needs.

The transportation of natural gas in pipes also results in methane leakage. Methane is 34 times stronger than CO_{2} at trapping heat over a 100-year period.

The disposal of wastewater at fracking sites by injecting it at high pressure into injection wells has caused small earth tremors. At least half of the 4.5 magnitude earthquakes in the United States in the last 10 years have happened in places where there has been injection.

Fracking also uses huge amounts of water that needs to be transported, which inflicts not only a high cost to the industry but also a high toll on the environment.

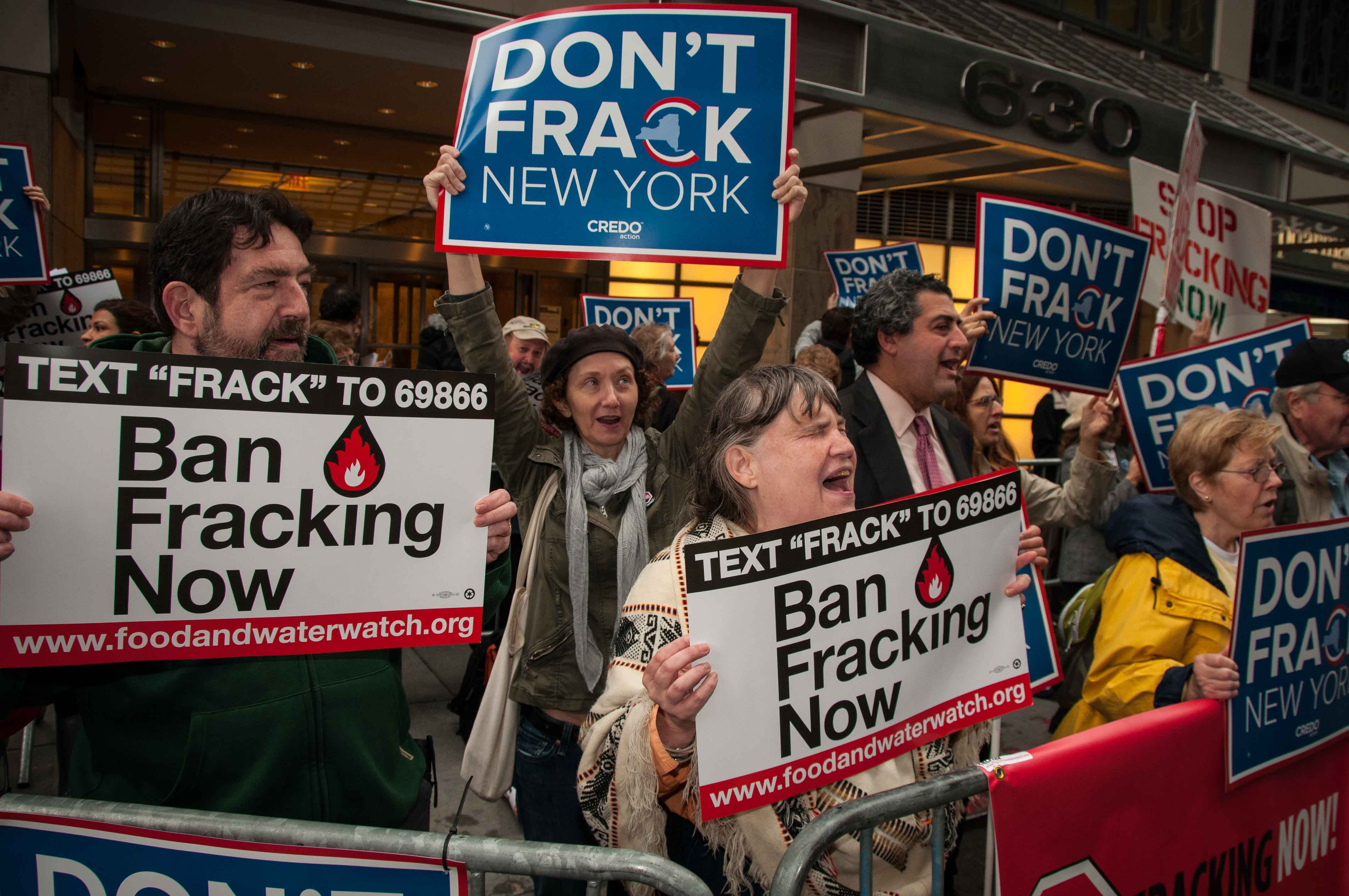
Anti-fracking protest

==== Social controversies ====
Anti-fracking campaigners, including Greenpeace, have said that fracking is the Department of Energy's attempt to distract from investment in renewable energy. This is because the natural gas industry is encouraging continued reliance on fossil fuels, which they claim boosts the economy through its exports and job opportunities.

The environmental justice aspect of this is that hydraulic fracturing sites are more likely to be located in places with a higher percentage of minority and low-income people. This means higher water contamination, air pollution, ecosystem harm, and more risk for earthquakes for those communities.

== See also ==
- Fossil fuel phase-out
- Coal power in the United States
- Energy policy of the United States
- Clean Power Plan
- Clean Air Act (United States)
- Green politics
- Presidential Climate Action Plan
- Energy policy of the Barack Obama administration
- Energy in the United States
- List of oil spills
- Oil spill governance in the United States
- Coal mining in the United States
- History of coal mining in the United States
- Environmental impact of the coal industry
