= Timeline of the Deepwater Horizon oil spill (July 2010) =

Following is a timeline of the Deepwater Horizon oil spill for July 2010 .

== July 1–5 ==
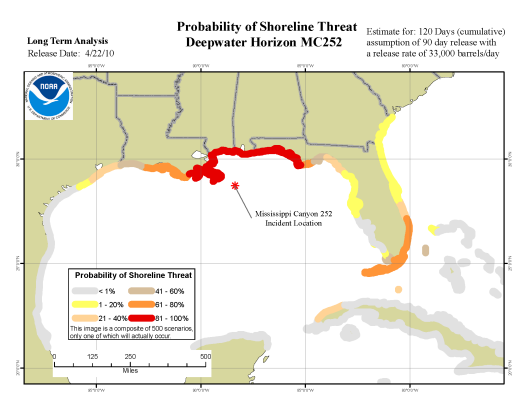
NOAA projections issued July 2 on probability of oil coming ashore

- July 1
  - Total estimated discharge since the start reaches 140,600,000 US gallons (530,000 m^{3}) – topping 140-million-US-gallon (530,000 m^{3}) Ixtoc I oil spill that was the previous biggest in the Gulf of Mexico.
  - Senate Republicans agree to lift secret hold that Jim DeMint placed to block legislation giving subpoena powers to the National Commission on the BP Deepwater Horizon Oil Spill and Offshore Drilling. Wesley Denton, DeMint's spokesman, says, ""Senator DeMint does not and will not have an objection to this legislation…He simply objected on behalf of other senators who had not been given time to review the bill. Now that they've had time to review it, it seems no one has an objection."
  - Kenneth Feinberg tells the House Small Business Committee that tourist-related businesses may not be able to collect from the fund set aside to pay damages. "If there's no physical damage to the beaches and it's a public perception, I venture to say that it is not compensable," he testifies.
  - The supertanker A Whale, belonging to TMT Shipping of Taiwan arrives at Boothville, Louisiana. It is billed at the "world's largest skimmer." It reports it can skim 21,000,000 US gallons (79,000 m^{3}) a day – 250 times the capacity of the fishing boats being used. It is awaiting approval to be used.
  - Hurricane Alex is downgraded to tropical storm and comes ashore in Mexico. 510 skimmers have been sent into port.
  - National Institute for Occupational Safety and Health and Occupational Safety and Health Administration establish recommendations for using respirators. They are particularly recommended for those where oil is being burned and voluntarily recommended elsewhere.
  - BP issues cards to employees and contractors telling them they are free to talk to the press.
- July 2
  - National Oceanic and Atmospheric Administration issues models of the probability of oil coming a shore based on historical winds and currents. The model show that Texas has a 1% chance of getting hit but that Florida Keys, Miami, Florida, and Fort Lauderdale, Florida areas have a greater probability (61%–80%) due to the potential influence of the Loop Current.
  - Allen says that number of skimmers in the Gulf should increase from 550 to 750 by mid-July and more by August.
  - Allen says that Hurricane Alex delayed the deployment of the Helix Producer and they are now on track for it to come online on July 7 allowing collection of up to 53,000 barrels (8,400 m^{3}) a day with the existing cap. A second vertical riser is being installed and it is hoped will go into operation by July 15. For everything to function a new cap will have to be installed. Allen reports an autonomous sub-sea dispersant delivery system has been proposed by BP for delivering disperants in case a hurricane forces the recovery operations to be suspended. The proposal is pending authorization. Allen says the options in case the relief wells do not work are establishing pipelines to production facilities up to 5 miles (8 km) away and then pumping it back down into the reservoir. Another option is to simply continue to pump oil out of the well if the cap is successful.
  - Paul Zukunft says impact of Alex’s seven foot waves impacting the well site and that 50 percent of the overflights were canceled. The A Whale begins trials.
  - Federal Emergency Management Agency (FEMA) trailers used in Hurricane Katrina are reported to be being used by BP to house employees. The Katrina trailers had issues with contamination from formaldehyde and had rules about their reuse. They do not have the serial numbers. Zukunft says they are not the Katrina trailers.
  - New York Times reports on Camp Hope in Arabi, Louisiana which was being used for rebuilding from Hurricane Katrina. BP has spent $600,000 on renovations to house 300 oil spill personnel.
  - Study by researchers from the Imperial College London published in Water Research says that oil interferes with the "ocean's natural filtration system, allowing arsenic levels to build up and threatens the long-term health of marine plants and animals."
- July 3
  - Unified Command issues press release which says, "The risk of weathered oil and tar balls from the Deepwater Horizon/BP oil spill coming to the Florida Peninsula and the Florida Keys remains low under current ocean and wind conditions. NOAA's long-term projection model released yesterday focused on the possible long-term shoreline threats and not on current wind and ocean conditions in the Gulf of Mexico...The model considers conditions that are typical for this time of year to evaluate the long-term likelihood of threats to different shorelines. Current conditions, especially given the absence of a significant amount of Deepwater Horizon/BP oil from the loop current, indicate that immediate threats to the Florida Keys, Miami and Ft. Lauderdale areas remain low."
- July 4
  - Don Ballard, the operations director for the Grand Isle branch of the Unified Command, says in a press release, "There is a long-term treatment plan for Grand Isle which includes the collection and washing of oiled sand including buried oil...Part of this plan includes collecting and storing oiled sand in piles for later cleaning. At no time has clean sand been used by clean-up crews to cover or bury oil or oiled sand."
  - The facility to treat oily birds at Fort Jackson, Louisiana is moved to Hammond, Louisiana to avoid hurricane complications.
  - The Unified Command issues a press release noting that its exclusion zone around booms is to protect the booms from damage and not to exclude press. "These 20-meter zones are only slightly longer than the distance from a baseball pitcher's mound to home plate. This distance is insignificant when gathering images. In fact, these zones, which do not target the press, can and have been opened for reporters as required. It is unfortunate that the safety zones are needed at all, but the responsibility of officials is to wage the most effective and safest response possible while best supporting factual and open reporting. That will continue until BP caps its leaking well and the cleanup is complete."
  - Unified Command releases story 10-year-old Ian Masson who raised $445 in a "Pennies for Pelicans" campaign in Michigan.
- July 5
  - BP says the spills outright cost is $3.12 billion and that so far it has received 95,000 claims and made around 47,000 payments. It says it has collected or flared 585,400 barrels (93,070 m^{3}), skimmed 673,497 barrels (107,077.5 m^{3}) and had control burns of 238,000 barrels (37,800 m^{3}).
  - Weather Service predicts wave heights of 3 to 6 feet (1.8 m) through July 8. Helix Producer cannot connect with heights greater than 3 feet.
  - Unified Command reports 1,000 Heavy Oil Recovery Devices (HORD) being manufactured in Pensacola, Florida and Bayou La Batre, Alabama are expected to come online within the next few weeks. The device was invented by Gerry Matherne to deal with the unique situation in the Gulf. Previous skimmers focused on surface oil whereas the current oil is degraded to peanut butter-consistency and is floating 12 to 18 inches below the surface. The device is described as "A mesh bag held open by a 3-foot (0.91 m) by 3-foot (0.91 m) aluminum frame and is dragged through the water by shrimp boats put into service as oil skimmers. The cage-like device scoops up surface oil and sheen, as well as the thick oil lurking beneath the surface of the water."
  - Small amounts of tarballs wash ashore on the Bolivar Peninsula, northeast of Galveston, Texas and on Galveston Island, itself. This is the first report of tarballs in Texas.
  - Oil is reported at Rigolets, raising fears it will hit Lake Pontchartrain.
  - Shokri Ghanem, chairman of National Oil Corporation urges the Libyan Investment Authority to increase its share of BP because "BP shares are good value for bargain hunters."
  - Tests on the A Whale prove inconclusive because of high waves.
  - National Hurricane Center says there is a 60 percent chance that a disorganized, low-pressure system could develop into a tropical storm before moving inland July 5 or 6.
  - U.S. Navy Blimp American Blimp MZ-3 deployed to Jack Edwards National Airport in Gulf Shores, Alabama. It is to be moored 3 miles (5 km) southeast of the Mobile Bay shoreline.
  - Barclays PLC, BNP Paribas SA, Citigroup Inc., Banco Santander SA, HSBC Holdings PLC, Royal Bank of Canada, Royal Bank of Scotland Group PLC and Société Générale are reported preparing a plan to give BP a $9 billion standby letter of credit.
  - New York Times reports that The Economist magazine is involved in a photo manipulation controversy over its altering a Reuters photo taken by Larry Downing on May 28, of Barack Obama with Lafourche Parish, Louisiana president Charlotte Randolph and Coast Guard Admiral Thad Allen on the beach in front an oil rig. In the edited photo Randolph and Allen were removed, with Obama shown looking downward, and the beach debris he was originally looking at was also cropped. The photo was used on the June 19 Economist cover with the headline "Obama v. BP". Emma Duncan, deputy editor of The Economist, responded "I asked for Ms. Randolph to be removed because I wanted readers to focus on Mr. Obama, not because I wanted to make him look isolated. That wasn't the point of the story. "The damage beyond the spill" referred to on the cover, and examined in the cover leader, was the damage not to Mr. Obama, but to business in America."

== July 6–10 ==
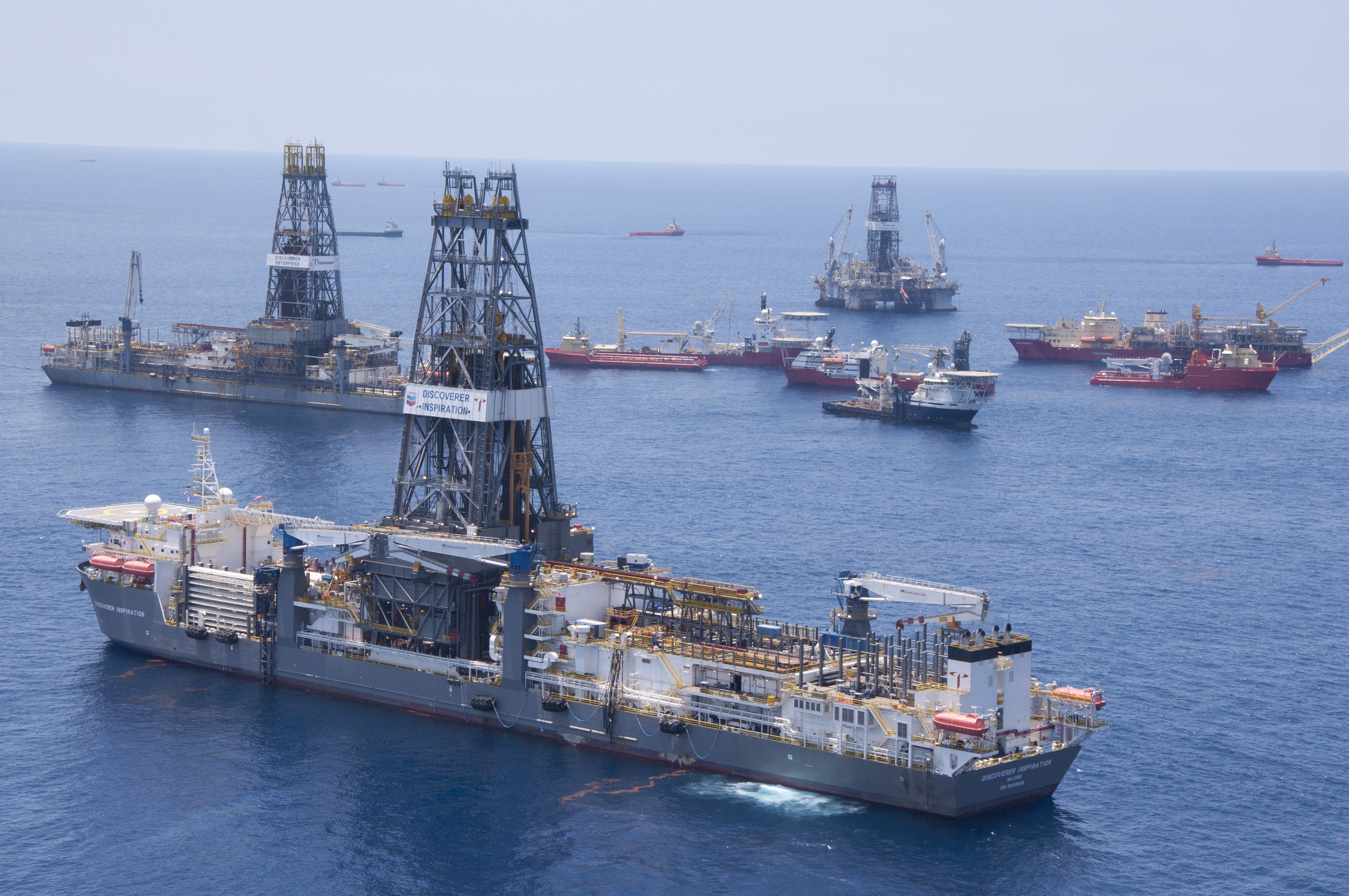
Discoverer Inspiration delivers the cap the spill on July 10. In the background are the Discoverer Enterprise, the Deepwater Driller II, and the Helix Producer I

- July 6
  - BP shares jump 6.5% in one day after it announces it will not issue more shares.
  - Helix Energy Solutions Group CEO Owen Kratz says BP waited 6 weeks until June 10 before accepting an offer to use Helix Producer I at the spill. The Producer has a larger capacity than the Deepwater Horizon.
- July 7
  - New website RestoreTheGulf.gov to replace deepwaterhorizonresponse.com as the official federal government website for the spill.
  - Allen says Development Driller III is within 15 feet (4.6 m) horizontally of the wellbore but wants to intercept it another 200 to 225 feet (69 m) further down.
  - Allen says Helix Producer is partially connected and should go into operation by July 10.
  - CNN reports that BP may have to pay the U.S. 18.75% royalties for oil coming gushing out of the well.
  - Criticism erupts over Bobby Jindal plan to build rock islands off the Louisiana coast from scientists and government officials who say it would disrupt the ecosystem.
- July 8
  - United States Court of Appeals for the Fifth Circuit in 2-1 vote refuses to overturn oil drilling moratorium in Hornbeck Offshore Services LLC v. Salazar. Administration says it will issue a new moratorium. Alliance for Justice reports that two of the appeals justices Jerry E. Smith and W. Eugene Davis had represented the oil and gas industries while in private practice. It reported that the third justice James L. Dennis who dissented had investments in at least 18 energy companies valued at between $31,000 and $300,000.
  - Nevada Senate candidate Sharron Angle tells KXNT she was wrong in calling BP oil's $20 billion victims' compensation program "a slush fund," backtracking just hours after her widely criticized remark.
  - CNN reports BP is becoming increasingly stringent with its demands for documentation from victims filing claims for lost wages and income.
  - Bob Dudley tells the Wall Street Journal "In a perfect world with no interruptions, it's possible to be ready to stop the well between July 20 and July 27." He cautioned that hurricanes could change that schedule.
  - Allen says that now is a weather window between tropical storms that would permit replacing the cap with a new cap that would be securely fasten to the blowout preventer that would be capable of capturing all of the oil believed to be coming out of the well. The cap would serve the existing rigs plus Helix Producer.
  - Allen sends letter to Dudley asking for a detailed timeline on the cap and contingency plans in case it fails.
- July 9
  - BP says it will replace the cap on the gusher on July 10.
  - BP reports 2-butoxyethanol was detected at levels up to 10 parts per million (ppm) in more than 20 percent of offshore responders and 15 percent of those near shore.
  - Anadarko informs BP that it is withholding the $272 million it was billed for the spill.
  - Democratic National Committee sets up website BPRepublicans.com in the wake of Angle's comments.
  - Authorities say the Texas tarballs reported July 5 were not from the BP spill.
- July 10
  - Old cap removed from well at 12:37 p.m. CDT in preparation for a new cap. Oil is expected to flow unabated into the Gulf for 48 hours.
  - Paul Zukunft to replace James A. Watson as the Federal On-Scene Coordinator (the third coordinator since the spill)
  - Reports indicate an unexpected crushed second pipe is in the blowout preventer. The pipe is believed to have either been blown up and fallen down in the initial explosion on the rig. Its presence prevented the shears from severing the riser from the well and closing it.

== July 11–15 ==
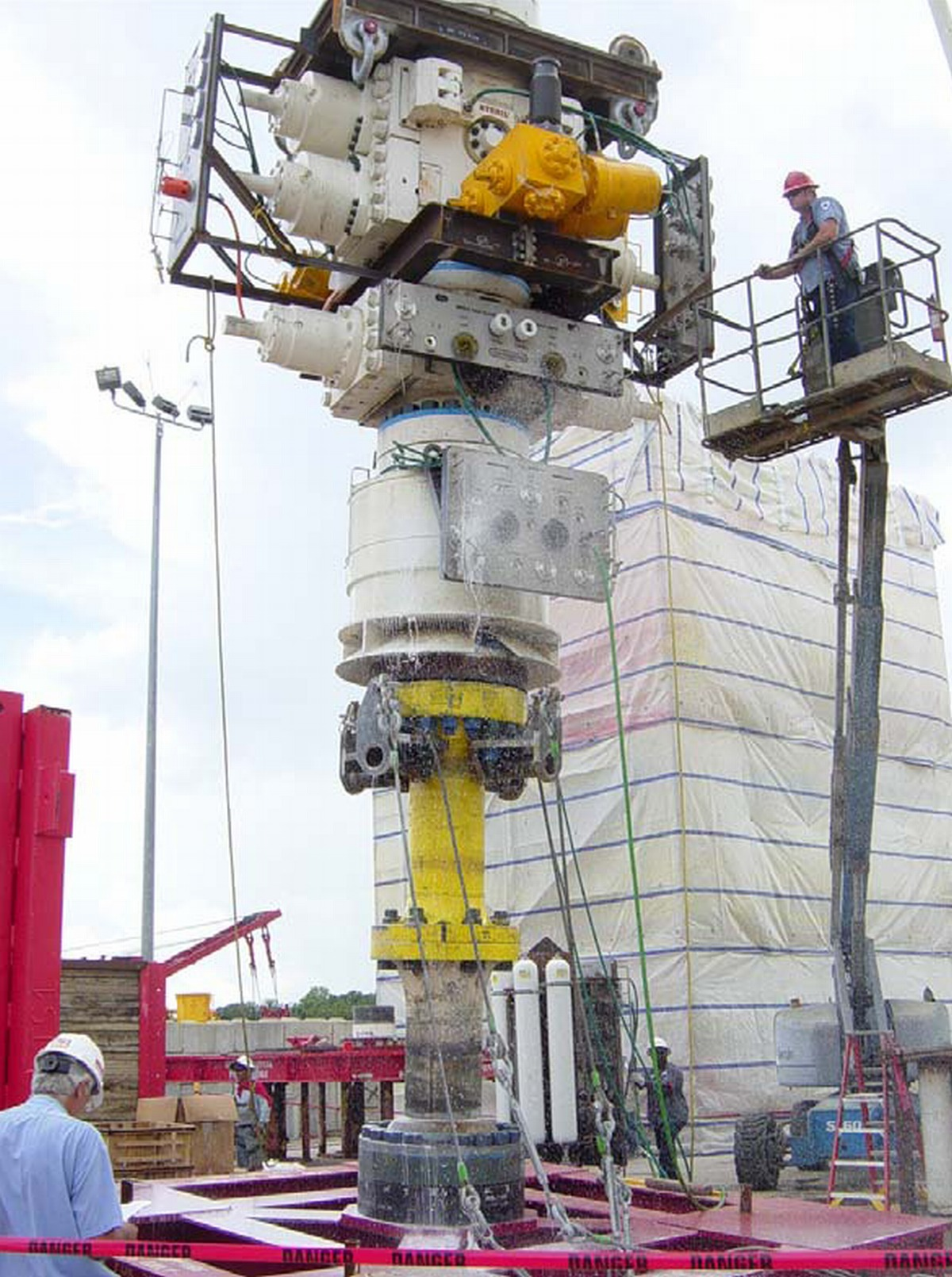
New sealing cap

- July 11
  - Discoverer Inspiration delivers the new cap to the site and Discoverer Enterprise moves off its site above the leak.
  - National Center for Atmospheric Research and University of Hawaii at Manoa release studies saying that if the spill continues to September 17 oil could reach the Carolinas, Georgia and Northern Florida by October 2010.
  - BP reported to be in contact with Apache Corporation to sell its Alaska oil fields.
  - BP (38%), China National Petroleum Corporation (37%) and Iraq's South Oil Co. (25%) sign contract for operation and management of the Rumaila oil field in Iraq.
- July 12
  - Three ram capping stack installed on the Deepwater Horizon LMRP at 7 p.m. CDT (0000 GMT). The stack completes the installation of the new 40-ton containment device sealing cap. Tests begin on testing well integrity.
  - Helix Producer begins containment procedures and then is disconnected to allow tests of the new cap.
  - Salzar issues a new moratorium until November 30 on deepwater wells that use a blowout preventer. It is different from the one stayed on June 21 in that it does not specify water depth but rather specifies the type of equipment. The suspension tells "BOEM to direct the suspension of any authorized drilling of wells using subsea or surface BOPs on a floating facility... cease the approval of pending and future applications for permits to drill wells using subsea or surface BOPs on a floating facility."
  - Florida panhandle hotels roll out a campaign saying they will issue refunds "if the beaches or water are deemed inaccessible by local officials."
  - National Commission on the BP Deepwater Horizon Oil Spill and Offshore Drilling begins two days of hearings at the Hilton New Orleans Riverside.
  - Dave Valentine of UC Santa Barbara and Chris Reddy of the Woods Hole Oceanographic Institute wrote concerning increased elevation of methane near the well "total quantity of methane and other hydrocarbons is enough to cause problems with the regional ecosystem, there is no plausible scenario by which this event alone will cause global-scale extinctions." The article also notes that Permiamn event lasted a millennium and was not an overnight event.
- July 13
  - BP delays a test to see if the cap can be fully closed to shut off the well. BP wants to further evaluate the well environment to make sure that if it shuts the valve it does not cause the well to erupt through the sea floor because it is unknown if the wellbore is compromised.
  - MOEX Offshore 2007 LLC refuses to pay $111 million BP has billed it.
  - Administration bills BP $99.7 million for clean up operations. This is the fourth bill. BP paid $122.3 million in the three earlier bills.
  - New York Senators Kirsten Gillibrand and Chuck Schumer and New Jersey Senators Robert Menendez and Frank Lautenberg ask Hillary Clinton of the United States State Department to investigate whether BP had a role in the 2009 British decision to release to Libya of Abdelbaset al-Megrahi who was accused of participating in the Lockerbie bombing. BP subsequently entered a deal with Libya for oil in that country. BP spokesman Mark Salt in replying to the news said that BP had in fact expressed concerns to the British government that a delay in the transfer "might have negative consequences for UK commercial interests, including ratification of BP's exploration agreement." However the spokesman added that the transfer "was solely a matter for the Scottish Executive and not for the UK Government."
  - The National Academy of Engineering appoints a panel to investigate the technical failures that resulted in the gulf oil spill in the "project Analysis of Causes of the Deepwater Horizon Explosion, Fire, and Oil Spill to Identify Measures to Prevent Similar Accidents in the Future." Donald C. Winter, a former secretary of the Navy, will lead the group, which is to issue an interim report in October and a final report next year.
- July 14
  - After the government approves test about 4 pm to see if the cap can be closed, containment vessels disconnect and oil flows freely into the Gulf as BP begins slowly closing the valves.
  - BP and other energy companies with track records of safety violations would be barred from applying for new drilling permits under a proposal approved by the United States House Committee on Natural Resources on amendment to H.R. 3534, "Consolidated Land, Energy, and Aquatic Resources Act of 2009" offered by George Miller. BP is not named specifically but the amendment says, "Companies also must be able to certify that they were not assessed more than $10 million in civil penalties and criminal fines for violations of the Federal Water Pollution Control Act over the preceding seven years."
  - The Bureau of Ocean Energy Management, Regulation and Enforcement (BOEM) and U.S. Coast Guard (USCG) to conduct on July 19–23, 2010 a third session of the Joint Investigation into the Deepwater Horizon Incident. This will be the third set of hearings, following two days of initial hearings May 11 and 12 and a second round May 26–29. Both sets of previous hearings featured tough questioning by the panelists and sometimes explosive testimony.
- July 15
  - At 5 am a leak is discovered and the test is halted while the leak is repaired. Between 10:30 am and 12:30 pm oil was cut off to the Q4000 and Helix Producer. At 1:15 p.m. the test on the new cap (effectively a smaller blowout preventer connected to the original damaged blowout preventer) closing the well begins. At 2:25 p.m. BP says that no flow of oil is going into the Gulf. A successful test will show constant pressure of 8000 to 9000 psi in the cap and the well could effectively stop the spill. If there are fluctuations the cap will be then divert oil to the containment ships until the relief well is put in place.
  - Thad Allen cautions in a statement, "It remains likely that we will return to the containment process using this new stacking cap connected to the risers to attempt to collect up to 80,000 barrels of oil per day until the relief well is completed."
  - Michael R. Bromwich, director of Interior's Bureau of Ocean Energy Management, Regulation and Enforcement sends BP a letter informing it must report "oil and gas-related activities associated with the Macondo well using Form MMS-4054" Further he says per the Outer Continental Shelf Lands Act BP is required to pay royalties immediately for all oil and gas captured from the Macondo well.

== July 16–20 ==
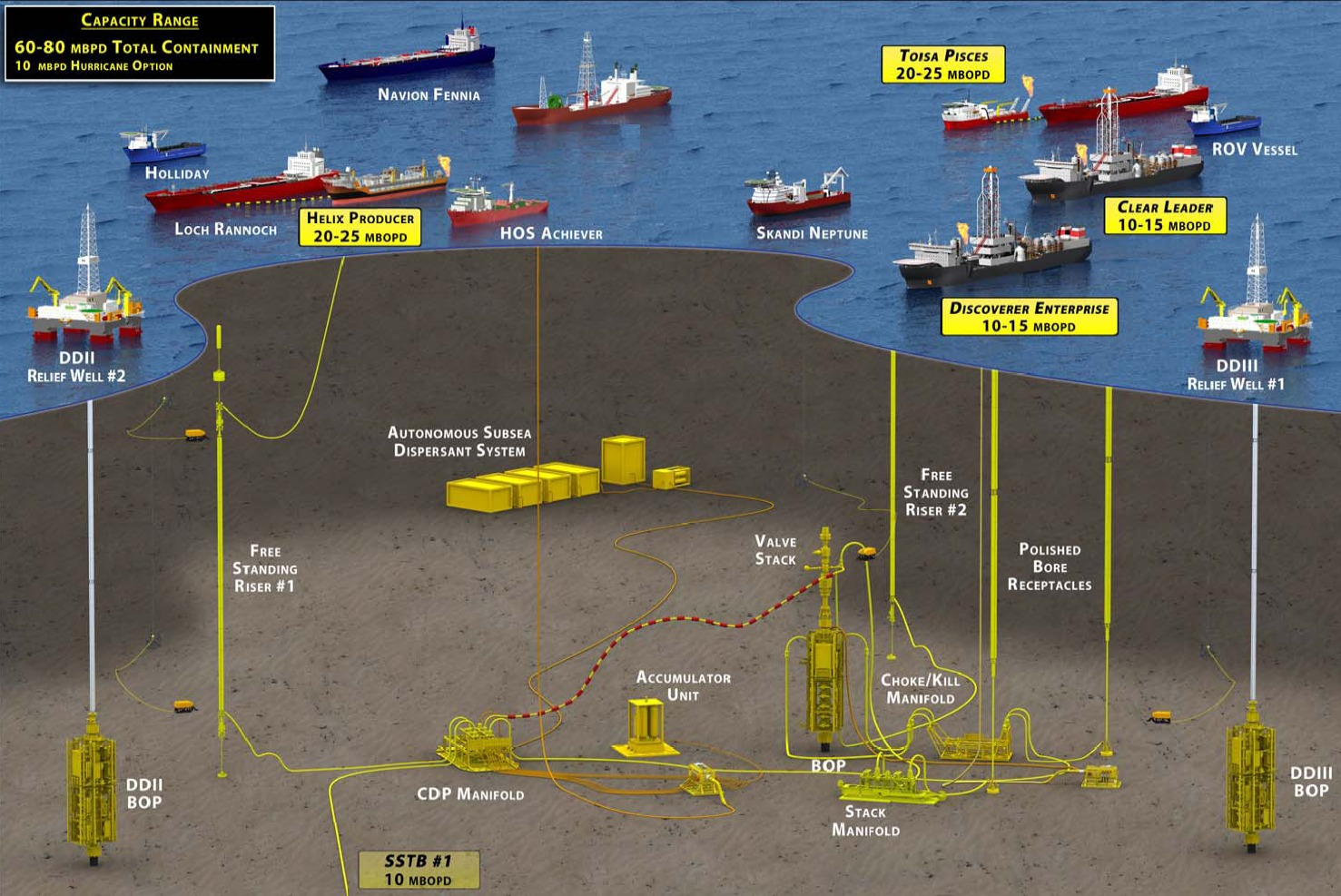
Diagram of ships in the "floating city" planned to be used for containment from mid-July on. The drawing was released on June 30 before the new sealed cap was established.

- July 16
  - Kent Wells in his morning technical briefing reports Development Driller III has resumed its activities which had been suspended for the test. Wells says pressure in the cap is 6,700 psi. It needs to get to 8,000 psi or more to ensure there are no leaks.
  - Allen says that he is concerned about the low pressure in the containment cap but that it might be a sign of depletion rather than leaking of the well. "This is generally good news…But we want to be careful not to do any harm or create a situation that could not be reversed."
  - Wells in his afternoon briefing says the depletion scenario was one of the models being considered going into the test. He adds that the casing below the blowout preventer is the same temperature as surrounding sea water. He notes that if oil were flowing it would be warmer. He says the relief well is within 30 feet (9.1 m) of its interception point. It is now 5 feet (1.5 m) horizontally from the wellbore.
  - Zukunft says the A Whale supertanker/skimmer will not be used because following tests "after significant effort, the amount of oil recovered was negligible, and limited oil beyond a sheen was found in the cargo tank" and that the much smaller skimmers on scene were more agile and effective.
  - BP is reported offering signing bonuses and lucrative pay to prominent scientists to aid in its Natural Resources Damage Assessment defense. According to the Press-Register BP is offering $250/hour. The contract is purported to prohibit "the scientists from publishing their research, sharing it with other scientists or speaking about the data that they collect for at least the next three years" and requires scientists "to agree to withhold data even in the face of a court order if BP decides to fight such an order. It stipulates that scientists will be paid only for research approved in writing by BP." Researchers from Louisiana State University, University of Southern Mississippi and Texas A&M are reported to have accepted offers.
- July 17
  - Allen says "When this test is eventually stopped, we will immediately return to containment, using the new, tighter sealing cap with both the Helix Producer and the Q4000. Additional collection capacity of up to 80,000 barrels per day is also being added in the coming days. Don Van Nieuwenhuise, director of Petroleum Geoscience Programs at the University of Houston, says "Thad Allen wants to do containment because they want to find out what the real flow rate was...Unless they do something like that, they'll almost never be able to prove what the true flow rate was."
- July 18
  - Doug Suttles noting pressure is at 6,778 psi and there is no indication of leaks says BP plans to keep the cap closed at least until the relief well takes effect. Thad Allen says that the status is only a test and that there will be extensions only in 24-hour increments. Allen said "nothing has changed about the joint agreement announced yesterday between BP and the US government. The ongoing well integrity test will continue until 4 p.m. EST today, with the potential for additional extensions in 24-hour increments. As a condition of the extension, the US government has required significant new monitoring and periodic evaluation and approval by our science team."
  - Thad Allen late in the day sent a letter to Dudley telling him "Given the current observations from the test, including the detected seep a distance from the well and undetermined anomalies at the well...I direct you to provide me a written procedure for opening the choke valve as quickly as possible without damaging the well should hydrocarbon seepage near the well head be confirmed."
- July 19
  - Thad Allen says that a conference call between federal science team and BP officials gave the science team "the answers they were seeking and the commitment from BP to meet their monitoring and notification obligations." He authorizes the test to continue another 24 hours. Allen says that the reported leak two miles (3 km) from the well "was a natural occurrence and not related to a pressure test to assess the well's condition"
  - Kent Wells says BP is considering a "static kill" of the well using heavy mud bumped through the new cap in a process known as bullheading.
  - Zukunft reports 40,122 people; 5,640 vessels; and 116 aircraft (including a recently added Bombardier Dash 8 from Icelandic Coast Guard) are deployed adding the "operational plan is based on the worst-case scenario."
  - The Deepwater Horizon joint investigation board concluded the first day of the third session of hearings into the circumstances surrounding the explosion, fire, pollution and sinking. The third session is being conducted with the focus on the "how" and the "why" (which might also be considered the "technical verification" phase). Witnesses were; W Stephen Bertone (Transocean, Chief Engineer), Lance John (Weatherford International, Rig System Specialist); Leo Linder (MI-Swaco, Drilling Fluid Specialist) Bertone testified there were deferred maintenance projects on the rig and there was a "possibility that alarms and other crucial systems were bypassed or not functioning at the time of the explosion" He testified the computer station where the rig's driller sits "had temporarily lost electrical power days before the blowout." He said following the explosion he "heard no general alarm, there were no internal communications and no power to the engines, and none of the Deepwater Horizon's backup or emergency generators were working." He said because there was no power workers could not engage the emergency disconnect system that would have halted the flow of oil from the wellhead.
  - BP is accused of photo manipulation in a photo of its Highly Immersive Visualization Environment (HIVE) control room at the company's U.S. headquarters in Westlake Park (Houston). The photo shows controllers in front of a bank of video screens with images of the Gulf. John Aravosis of Americablog reported that the screens were photoshopped because they overlapped a controller's head. Aravosis also noted Exif metadata time stamp of 2001. Scott Dean, a spokesman for BP, released an original unaltered version of the photo and noted that three images were inserted into screens which were blank at the time. BP subsequently replaced the manipulated photo with the original with the three screens dark.
- July 20
  - Leo Lindner, a drilling fluid specialist for contractor MI-Swaco (a joint venture of Smith International and Schlumberger), testifies that more than 400 barrels (64 m^{3}) of a combination of two chemicals used for flushing drilling mud and commonly called "spacer fluid" was poured into the well in the hours before the explosion. The quantity was twice the usual amount and was done to take "advantage of an exemption in an environmental law that otherwise would have prohibited it (BP) from discharging the hazardous waste into the Gulf of Mexico." A fluid resembling it which was described as "snot" rained down on the rig after the explosion. Ronnie Penton, an attorney for one of the rig workers, said the fluid skewed the pressure test before BP approved a plan to use lighter sea water rather than heavy mud in the plan to temporarily seal the well.
  - Florida House of Representatives votes 67–44 to adjourn a special session thus not approving Constitutional ban on drilling backed by Charlie Crist. State law already bans drilling.
  - The Deepwater Horizon joint investigation board concluded the second day of the third session of hearings. Witnesses were; Ronald Sepulvado - BP, Well Site Leader, Ross Skidmore - BP, Subsea Well Supervisor, Lee Lambert - BP, Well Site Trainee. Testimony at investigative hearings in Kenner on Tuesday 20th showed that time after time in the days and weeks leading to its April 20 oil well blowout, BP eschewed safer options and chose more dangerous ways to handle its difficult Macondo oil well.
  - The Deepwater Horizon joint investigation hearing for Wednesday, July 21, 2010 was cancelled as the four Transocean witnesses scheduled to testify declined to voluntarily appear at the hearings. The work area of these four was the Blow Out Preventer and they have supervisory functions.
  - Prime Minister of the United Kingdom David Cameron after meeting Obama at the White House tells reporters in the East Room says, "On BP, which we discussed at some length, I completely understand the anger that exists right across America. The oil spill in the Gulf of Mexico is a catastrophe -- for the environment, for the fishing industry, for tourism. I've been absolutely clear about that. And like President Obama, I've also been clear that it is BP's role to cap the leak, to clean up the mess, and to pay appropriate compensation...Equally, of course, BP is an important company to both the British and the American economies. Thousands of jobs on both sides of the Atlantic depend on it. So it's in the interest of both our countries, as we agreed, that it remains a strong and stable company for the future."
  - Cameron in response to the discussion about whether BP was involved in a deal in the Lockerbie bombing case he says, "And let us not confuse the oil spill with the Libyan bomber. I've been absolutely clear about this right from the start, and in our meeting we had what we call a "violent agreement," which is that releasing the Lockerbie bomber, a mass murderer of 270 people, the largest act of terrorism ever committed in the United Kingdom, was completely wrong ... That wasn't a decision taken by BP; it was a decision taken by the Scottish government. We have to accept that under the laws of my country, where power on certain issues is devolved to Scotland, this was a decision for the Scottish Executive, a decision that they took. Cameron also met with the four U.S. senators who sent a letter questioning the release. Senator Schumer says after the meeting, "The best news that we came out with was that the Prime minister said our request for an independent investigation -- not just a look at the documents -- was still on the table."

== July 21–25 ==
- July 21
  - ExxonMobil, Chevron, ConocoPhillips and Shell commit $1 billion to create a rapid-response system to deal with deepwater oil spills in the Gulf of Mexico, seeking to restore public confidence in the industry .
  - The Deepwater Horizon joint investigation at Kenner, La heard testimonies from Natalie Roshto - Transocean, Widow of Shane Roshto, John Guide - BP, Well Team Leader, providing information on well design, Shane Albers - BP, Subsea Engineer, providing information on procedures for seal assembly and lock-down rig.
- July 22
  - Allen directs ships and personnel to leave the area as Tropical Storm Bonnie approaches. This includes suspending the relief wells and abandoning temporarily the static kill proposal on the new cap. Allen directs that the ROVs are to be the last to leave and first to return so the well can be monitored.
  - NOAA reopens 26,388 square miles (68,340 km^{2}) of Gulf waters to commercial and recreational fishing—one third of the total closed area. The area is 220 miles (350 km) from the wellhead, along the west Florida shelf.
- July 23
  - The Deepwater Horizon joint investigation hearing at Kenner, Louisiana hears testimonies from Mike Williams - Transocean, Chief Engineer Tech, providing information regarding the gas detection system and general alarm system. John R. Smith - Consultant, Subject Matter Expert, providing information on the operations for 24-hours prior to the Deepwater incident, Tyrone Benton - Oceaneering International, ROV Technician, providing information on the leaks associated with BOP stack. Transcripts of hearings will be available on the Deepwater Investigation Web site approximately three weeks after the conclusion of each set of hearings. Documents discussed during the hearings will be available when the final report is released in January 2011. A fourth session is tentatively scheduled to take place August 23–27, 2010 in Houston, Texas
  - The two relief wells detach and pull up risers which are in 40 to 60-foot (18 m) sections that are disassembled and put on deck of the drilling rigs.
  - USCGC Stratton (WMSL-752) christened in Pascagoula, Mississippi by Michelle Obama who takes two whacks to crack the champagne bottle across the bow. She praises the Coast Guard response saying "They come from all over the country to help with the largest response of its kind in American history."
- July 24
  - Kenneth Feinberg says BP has not placed any money in $20 billion escrow account.
  - BP says an internal investigation has cleared itself of gross negligence in the spill and will publish the findings in the next month.
  - Allen says two vessels stayed at the scene during Bonnie which was weaker than expected has left.
  - Allen says plans are proceeding for "static kill" through the new cap.
- July 25
  - Bonnie has been downgraded to a disorganized area of low pressure
  - Allen reports temperature in the cap is 40F, a sign of stability.

== July 26–31 ==
- July 26
  - BP expert say the environmental impact from the spill might be small and marshes could recover by Spring 2011. .
- July 27
  - Towing vessel Pere Ana C pushing the barge Captain Beauford collides with Louisiana-owned oil and natural gas rig C177 in the northern part of Barataria Bay south of Lafitte, Louisiana. 6,000 feet (1,800 m) of boom are placed around rig while it is evaluated.
  - Allen says static kill from the top is scheduled to begin August 2. .
  - BP board formally announces that Bob Dudley will replace Tony Hayward as BP CEO effective October 1.
  - BP takes pretax charge of $32 billion to cover damages, business claims and cleanup costs over the next several years from costs associated with the spill. The charge will save it $10 billion in taxes.
- July 28
  - Ron LaBrec of the Coast Guard tells Center for Public Integrity that responders to the initial fire on the Deepwater Horizon used saltwater rather than retardant foam and this may have contributed to the rig's sinking. "We have expertise in fighting a fire on board our vessels, but since firefighting is not one of our missions, we do not train for rig fires and that has really been the responsibility of the rig owner and operator," LaBrec said.
- July 29
  - Allen says the Q4000 has been retrofited to pump mud rather than collect oil. Allen says it would take a "catastrophic event" to go back to collecting oil at the site and that it would take a few days to bring Helix Producer I and Discoverer Enterprise back online to collect oil.
- July 30
  - Jane Lubchenco, NOAA Administrator, says that as long as the cap remains closed studies show that "Southern Florida, the Florida Keys and the East Coast are not likely to experience any effects from the remaining oil on the surface of the Gulf as the oil continues to degrade and is hundreds of miles away from the loop current." The study notes a large loop current eddy, called Eddy Franklin, has pinched off and detached from the loop current keeping the oil from hitting the Keys and Florida east coast.
  - Allen says clearing out debris in the well could delay starting the topkill one day until August 3.
  - Allen says plans are being reviewed for retrieving 11 million feet of oil booms.
  - Well pressure is at 6,969 psi and temperature is 40F.
  - Dudley says the clean up operation could begin to be scaled back. He also praises Hayward for having the decency to stand down "just when things are starting to go right".
- July 31
  - Alan says a new government flow rate estimate is going to be issued.
  - BP announces plans to sell offshore gas and oil fields in Vietnam and Pakistan.
  - Wirtschaftswoche reports BP is looking to sell its German gas station system Aral AG to either the French company Total S.A. or the Russian company Rosneft.

== August 2010 ==
- Timeline of the Deepwater Horizon oil spill (August 2010)
