= Robert S. Young =

American geologist and professor

Robert S. Young is professor of coastal geology at Western Carolina University and director of the Program for the Study of Developed Shorelines.

== See also ==
- Sea level rise
