= Unified Command (Deepwater Horizon oil spill) =

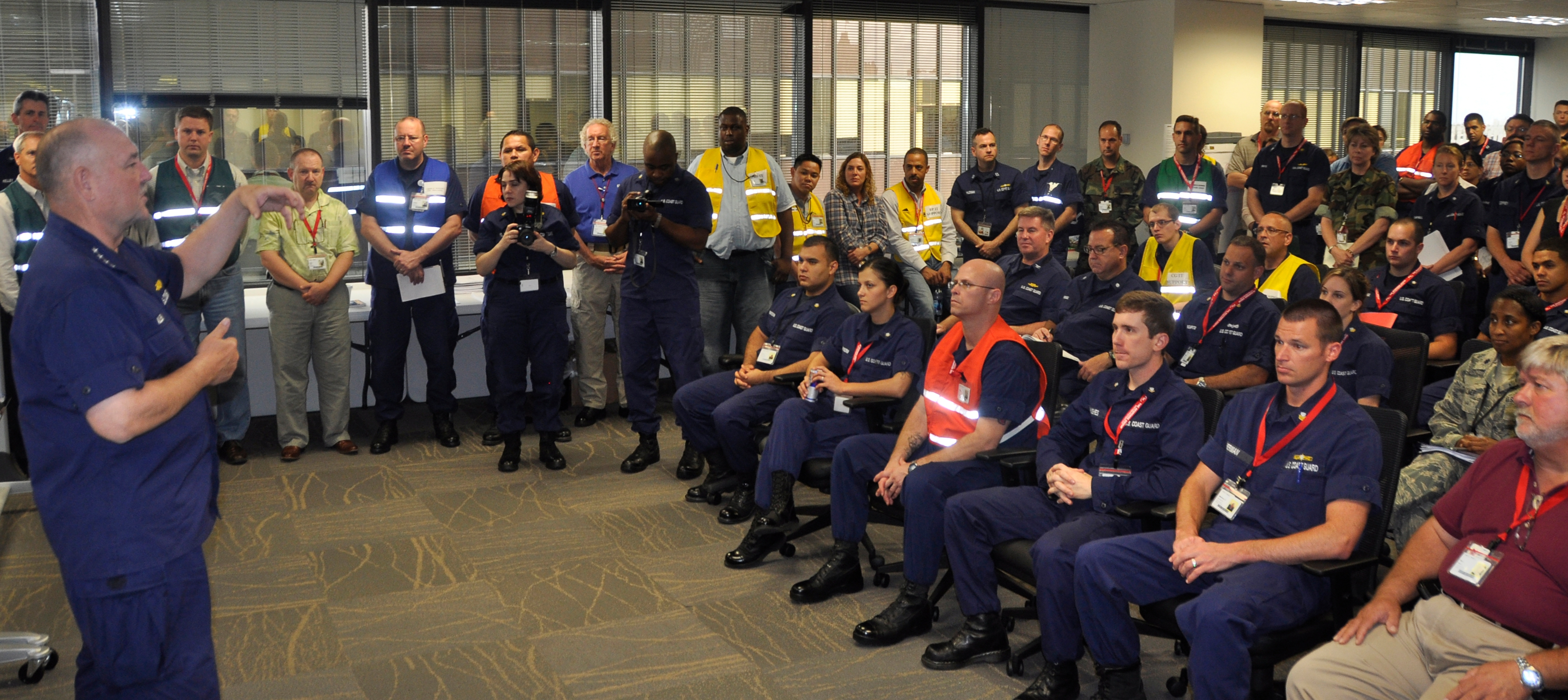
National Incident Commander, Admiral Thad Allen provides a briefing to the Unified Area Command in New Orleans on June 28, 2010.

The Unified Command provided Incident Command System/Unified Command (ICS) for coordinating response to the Deepwater Horizon oil spill.

The organization was initially headquartered at the Shell Robert Training and Conference Center in Robert, Louisiana. On June 15, 2010, they announced plans to move its 350 staff into 38,224 square feet (3,551.1 m^{2}) of space to downtown New Orleans, Louisiana near the Superdome.

The group operated via consensus on managing the spill and making official statements. Incident commanders from each group reported to the National Incident Commander, Admiral Thad Allen, USCG. The Command had Incident Command Centers in Houma, Louisiana; Mobile, Alabama; and Miami, Florida (moved on June 11 2010 from St. Petersburg, Florida).

Among the functions was the Joint Information Center, consisting of Public information officers from the various components which coordinated the daily news.

== Components ==
The following organizations were members of the Unified Command:

- BP
- Transocean
- U.S. Coast Guard
- Minerals Management Service
- NOAA
- U.S. Environmental Protection Agency
- U.S. Department of Homeland Security
- U.S. Department of Interior
- U.S. Department of Defense
- U.S. Fish and Wildlife Service
- U.S. National Park Service
- U.S. Department of State
- U.S. Geological Survey
- Centers for Disease Control and Prevention
- Occupational Safety and Health Administration
