= A Whale (ship) =

Ore-bulk-oil carrier built in 2010

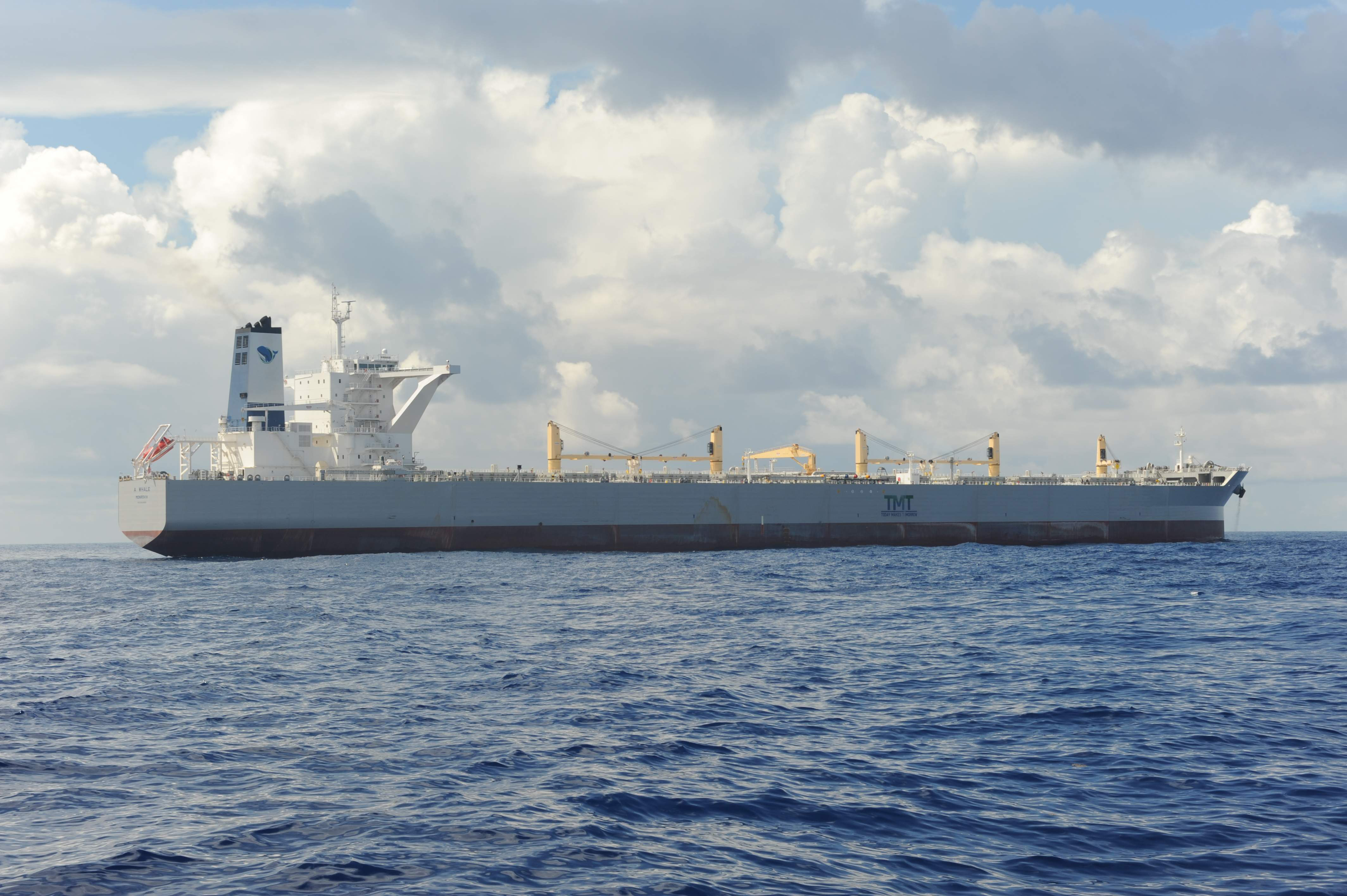
- A Whale conducting a test run of its oil skimming capabilities as part of the Deepwater Horizon response July 4, 2010.

History
- Name: Cosmo Ace
- Owner: Oriental Fleet Tanker 19, Ltd.
- Operator: Suntech Ship Management; Monarch Vessel Holdings Corporation; TMT Co. Ltd. (formerly Taiwan Maritime Transport Co. Ltd.), Taipei; Republic of China (Taiwan)
- Port of registry: Liberia, Monrovia
- Builder: Hyundai Heavy Industries Co., Ltd; Ulsan, South Korea
- Yard number: 2045
- Launched: 25 Sep 2009
- In service: 6 Jan 2010
- Renamed: A Whale (2010–2014); Madison Orca (2014–2020)
- Identification: Call sign: A8UA7; IMO number: 9424209; MMSI number: 636014465
- Status: Active as of 2020

General characteristics
- Class & type: Lloyds Register: 100A1
- Type: Ore-oil carrier
- Tonnage: 319,869 DWT, 172,146 GT
- Length: 340 m (1,120 ft)
- Beam: 60 m (200 ft)
- Draught: 22.3 m (73 ft)
- Speed: 13.7 kn (25.4 km/h; 15.8 mph)

Cosmo Ace, formerly A Whale and Madison Orca, is a Liberian-flagged ore-oil carrier built in 2010 by Hyundai Heavy Industries, Ulsan, South Korea for TMT Co. Ltd. (formerly Taiwan Maritime Transport Co. Ltd.) from the Republic of China (Taiwan). She has seven other sister ships in the fleet, built in 2010-2011 and named in succession: B Whale, C Whale etc., to H Whale.

== Oil skimming experiments ==
She was refitted and converted in Portugal into a skimmer to assist in the cleanup of the BP Deepwater Horizon oil spill in Gulf of Mexico, near the Mississippi River Delta, Louisiana. The ship's owners stated that A Whale is capable of separating 300,000 to 500,000 US gallons (1,000 to 2,000 m^{3}) of oil per day, while storing the crude and returning the processed sea water to the sea.

A Whale arrived in the Gulf of Mexico on 30 June 2010, while financial agreements were yet pending. However, in two weeks of testing A Whale collected virtually no oil. TMT stated that the ship's poor performance was due to the dispersion of oil in the Gulf.

On July 16, the Coast Guard announced it would not be authorized to join the containment process because tests had shown that its oil skimming capabilities were "negligible" in comparison to the other more nimble and much smaller skimmers in the containment.

== Service history ==
In early 2013, the A Whale became stranded due to a technical problem off Suez. The ship's crew remained stranded for six months without pay, exacerbated by owner TMT's bankruptcy filing in June, before eventually receiving supplies and some of their backpay in July. That August the ship was allegedly fired on by Libyan Marine Special Forces, according to a video posted on their Facebook page, as it attempted to enter the Es Sider terminal.

In 2014 the ship was renamed to Madison Orca and transferred to Monarch Vessel Holdings Corporation. As of December 2020, operated by Suntech Maritime, she is in active service as the Cosmo Ace.

== See also ==
- List of world's longest ships
- Deepwater Horizon explosion
