= Lesar =

Lesar is a surname. Notable people with the surname include:

- David J. Lesar (born 1953), American business executive
- Dragutin Lesar (born 1956), Croatian politician
