= Containment dome =

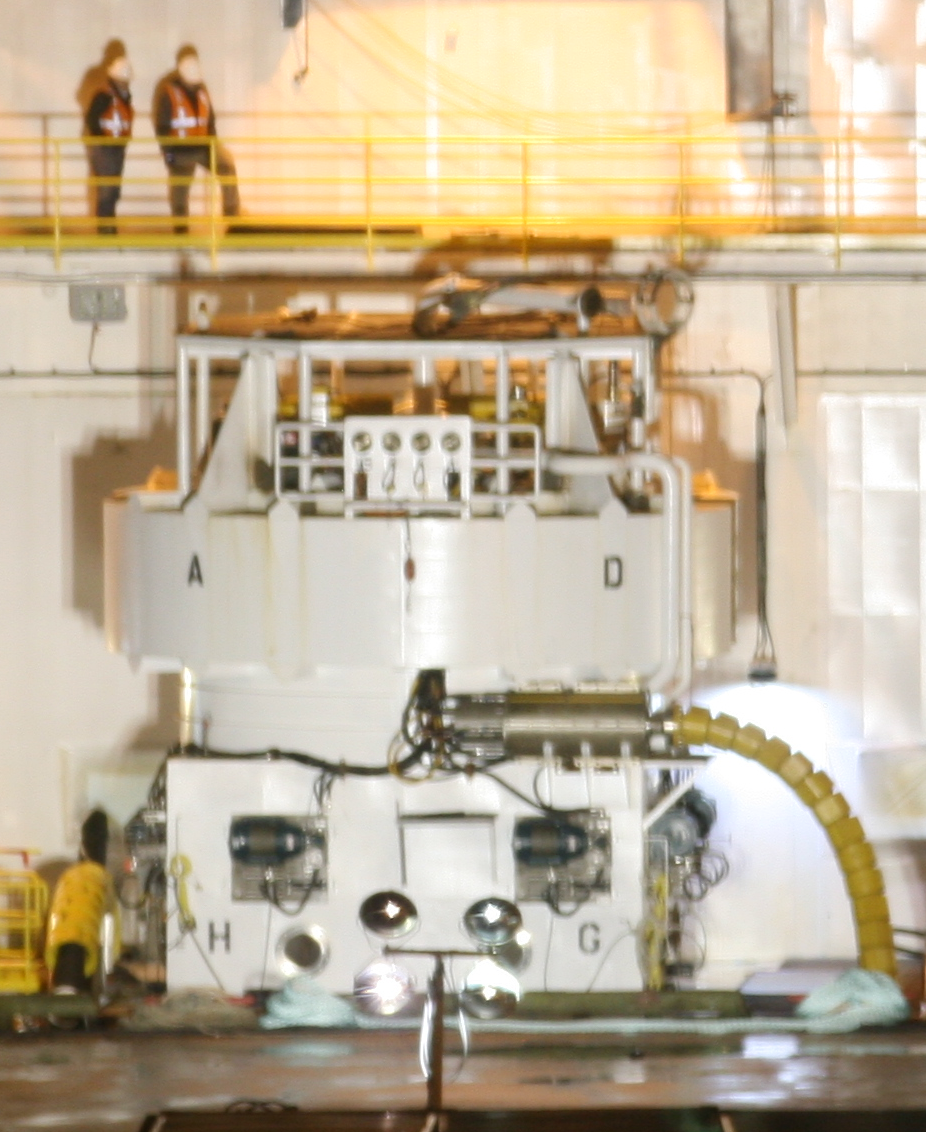
The second iteration of the containment dome after placement on the Arctic Challenger in December, 2012

A containment dome is a component of the system designed to contain the underwater blowout of an oil well such as occurred with the Macondo Well blowout from the Deepwater Horizon oil spill. This portion of the system is designed as a vacuum to suck up the products being expelled from a blowout and deliver those products to the containment system housed on the vessel moored above the blowout. Superior Energy Services is constructing this device to be used by Shell Oil Company on the barge Arctic Challenger as their "fourth line of defense" against a blowout in the Arctic drilling regions in the Chukchi Sea and Beaufort Sea.

The fourth method, which was constructed in Bellingham, Washington, US is the containment barge carrying the dome. "The containment system is an apparatus that would essentially hover over a compromised well funneling escaping oil, gas and water into this dome," Smith said.

The report of the National Commission on the Deepwater Horizon Oil Spill and Offshore Drilling has some applicable quotes regarding cold water and hydrocarbon recovery which may apply to the application of this technology to Arctic drilling purposes. The likelihood of collecting oil with the cofferdam was uncertain, chief among potential problems was the risk that methane gas escaping from the well would come into contact with cold sea water and form slushy hydrates, essentially clogging the cofferdam with hydrocarbon ice. The effort did fail, for that reason. Because hydrocarbons are lighter than water, the containment dome became buoyant as it filled with oil and gas while BP tried to lower it. BP engineers told Lynch that they had "lost the cofferdam" as the dome, full of flammable material, floated up toward the ships on the ocean surface. Averting a potential disaster, the engineers were able to regain control of the dome and move it to safety on the sea floor. In the wake of the cofferdam's failure, one high-level government official recalled Andy Inglis, BP's Chief Executive of Exploration and Production, saying with disgust, "If we had tried to make a hydrate collection contraption, we couldn't have done a better job".
