= Seattle Arctic drilling protests =

Seattle-based protest

- Part of Petroleum exploration in the Arctic
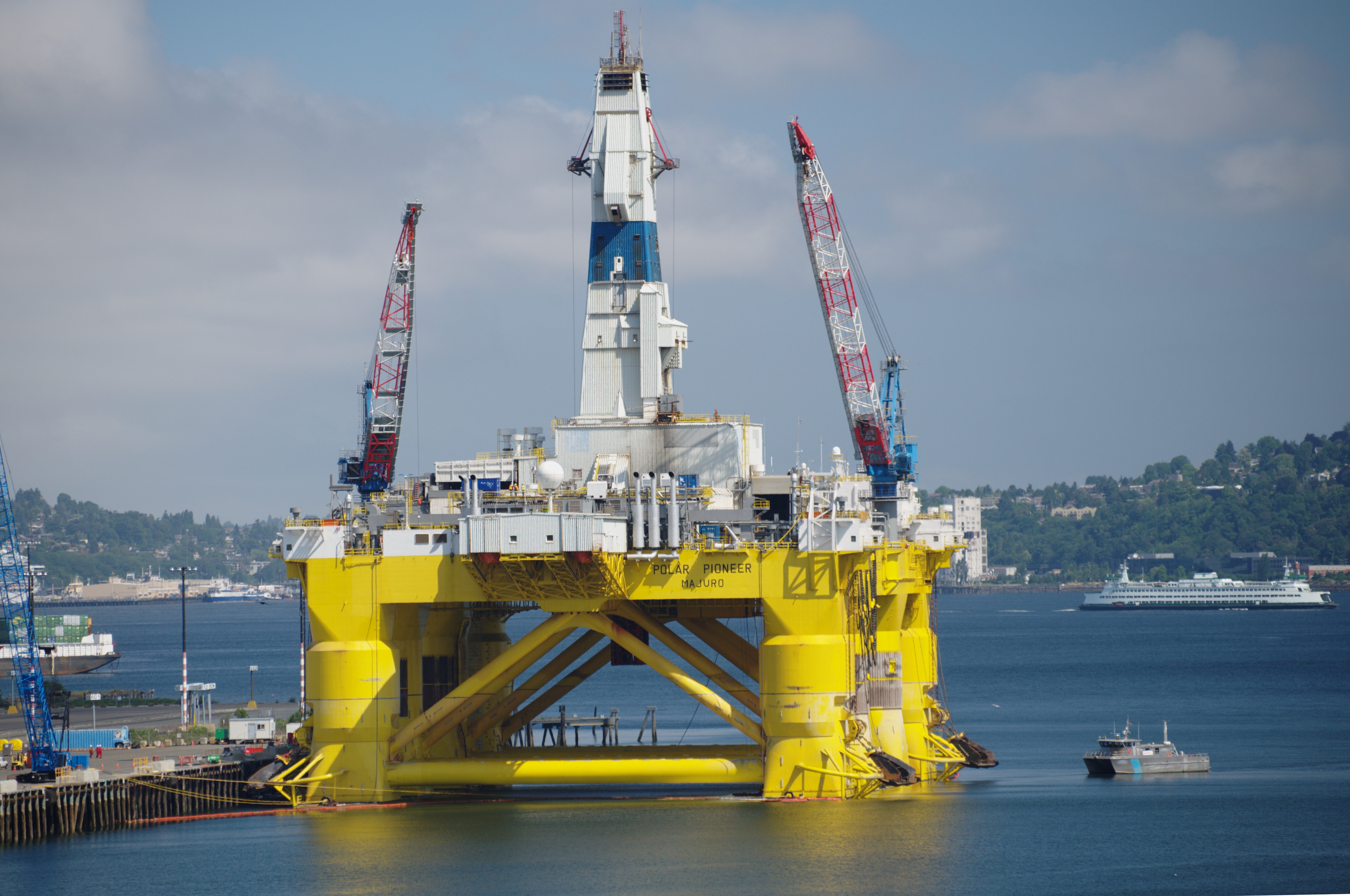
- Shell Polar Pioneer semi-submersible offshore drilling rig at the Port of Seattle
- Location: Seattle, Bellingham, Everett

Protests against Arctic drilling began in Seattle in 2015 in response to the news that the Port of Seattle authority made an agreement with Royal Dutch Shell to berth offshore drillships and semi-submersibles at the Port's Terminal 5 (T5) during the off-season of oil exploration in Alaskan waters of the Arctic. Hundreds of protesters took to Elliott Bay in kayaks, rafts, and other small boats, both as a demonstration and to interrupt docking of Shell's Polar Pioneer semi-submersible drilling vessel at Terminal 5. The waterborne demonstrators were dubbed kayaktivists by social and news media.

On September 27, 2015, Shell announced that their exploration in the summer of 2015 was "disappointing" and that they would abandon further oil exploration in the Arctic "for the foreseeable future".

== Historical background ==
"All science points to the fact that oil is an archaic technology at this point. It's not a sustainable technology to further invest in."

— Kayaktivist Dana Schuerholz, Vashon Island elementary school teacher.

"For Seattle to remain a thriving and viable maritime city, it cannot continue to set a hostile tone and environment toward our port and maritime sector."

— Joshua Berger of the Washington Maritime Federation.

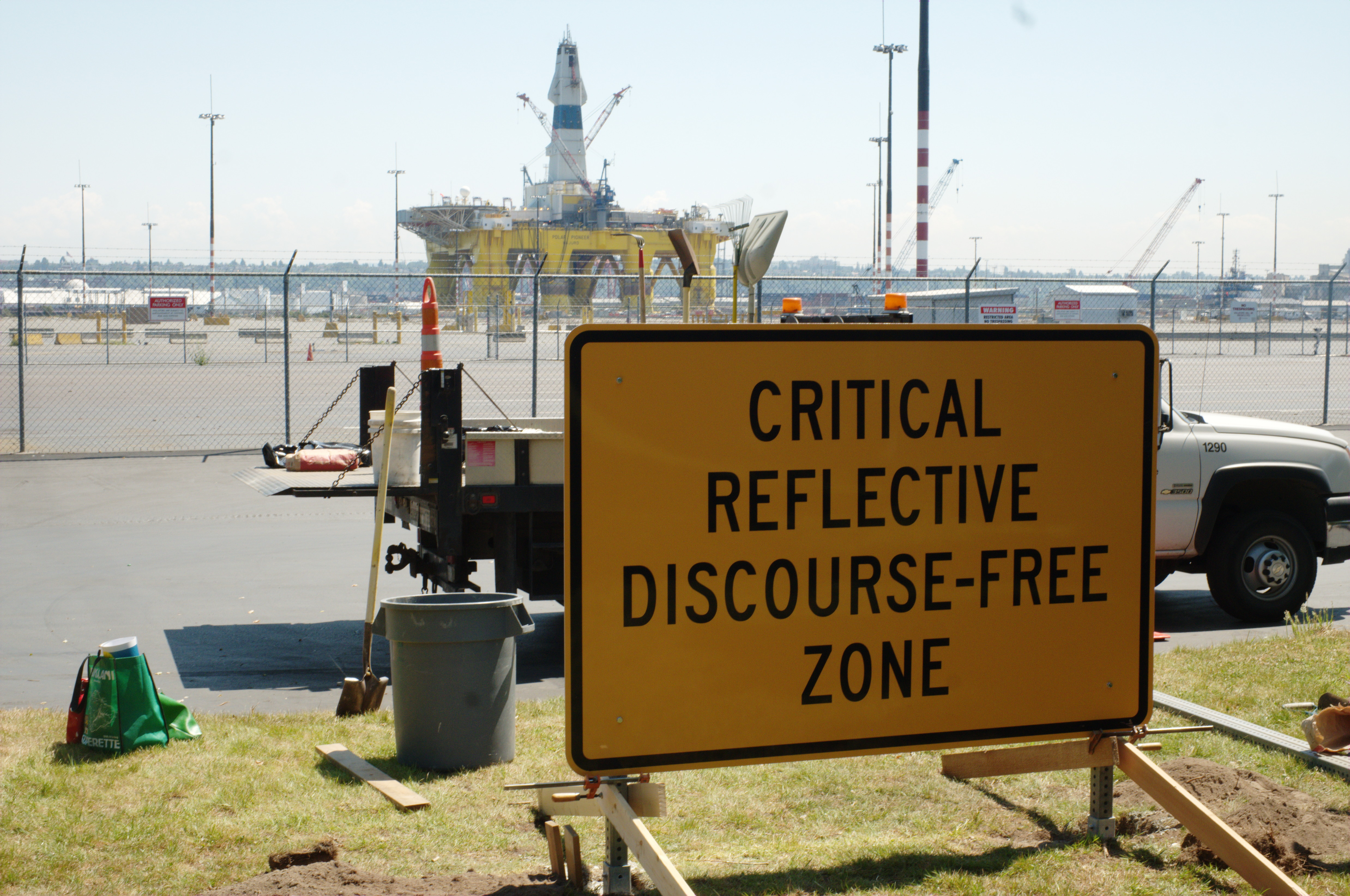
Satirical sign at Jack Block Park by Seattle artist Jack Daws

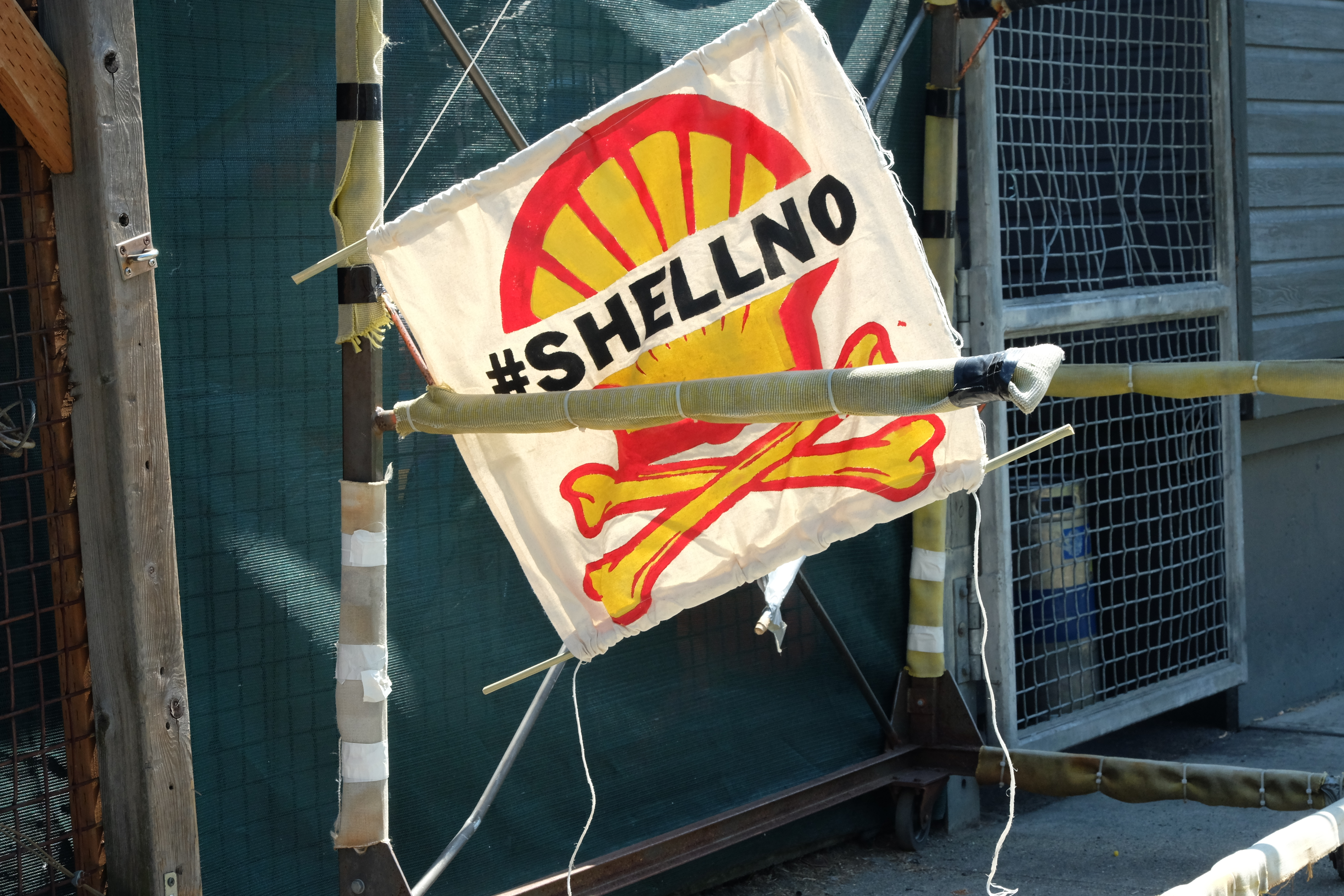
Activists coordinated on social media with the hashtags #ShellNo and #paddleinseattle

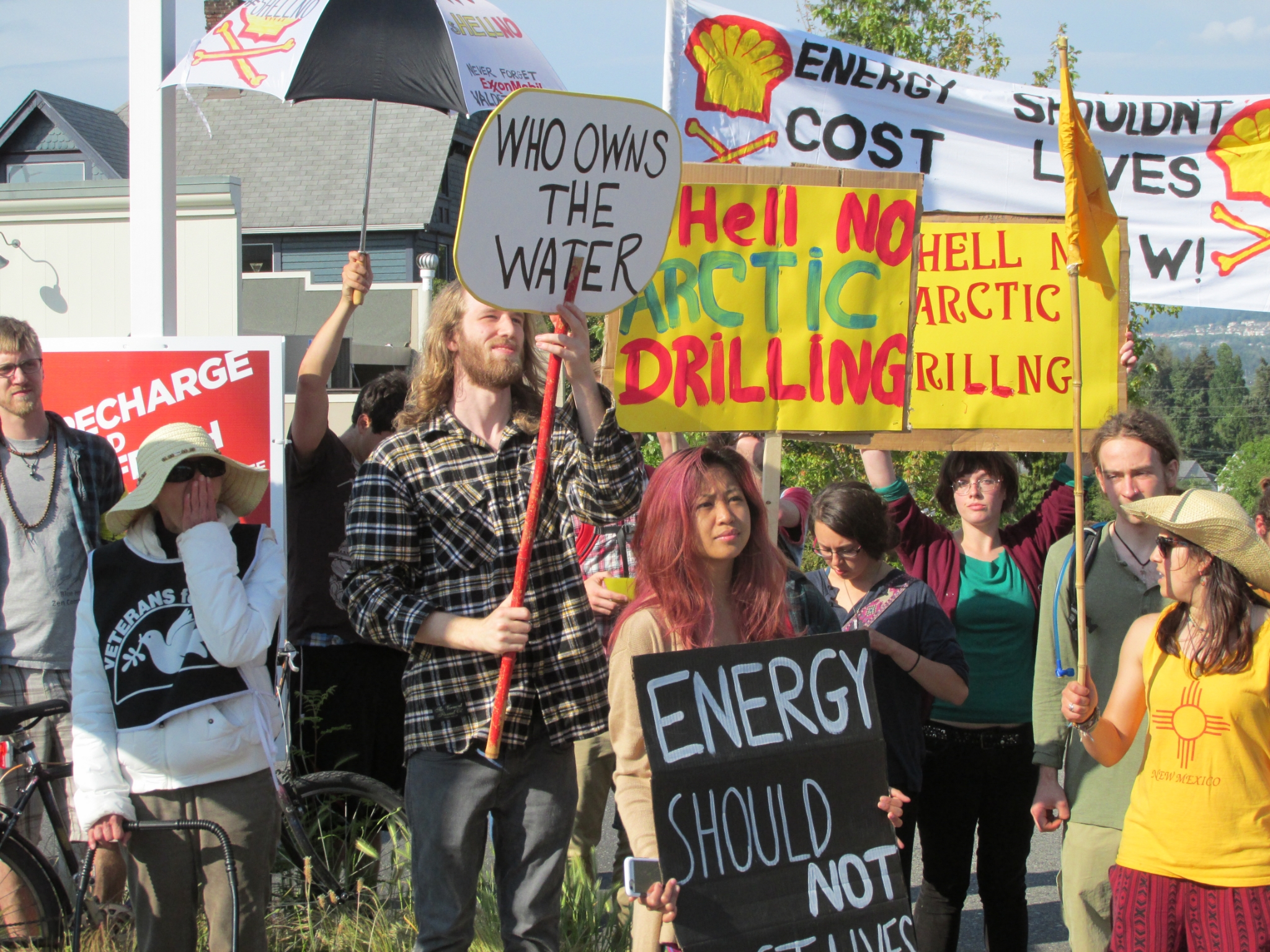
Protesters in Bellingham

Seattle has been a staging point for those seeking to exploit the natural resources of the Alaska region since the Klondike Gold Rush of 1896, when the city was the main supply center and departure point for prospectors heading to the gold fields of Alaska and the Yukon. The perception by some Alaskans that Seattle exerted undue influence on the Territory helped motivate their desire for Alaskan statehood, achieved in 1958. Since the discovery of oil in Prudhoe Bay in 1968, Seattle has played an integral role in the Alaska petroleum industry.

The city of Seattle says the maritime sector which includes ship builders, cargo vessels and tug companies comprises 22,000 jobs for a $2.1 billion annual contribution to the Seattle economy.

Seattle is known for environmentalism. A theme of the 1999 Seattle WTO protests was the reconciliation of the labor and environmental movements under the slogan "Teamsters and Turtles: Together at Last", seeking to end the traditional stalemate of job creation pitted against environmental protection in a zero sum conflict.

In the summer 2012, Shell refurbished the Kulluk and the Noble Discoverer drillships in Seattle, which the company said employed 400 shipyard workers and put $200 million into the local economy. The ships were for use in exploration for oil in the Beaufort and Chukchi Seas off Alaska's North Coast, which if successful could begin production no sooner than 2023. Greenpeace opposed these plans, and some Iñupiat people of the North Slope said that in spite of the economic benefits to them, they feared damage to the ocean environment they depend on for food. A Barrow, Alaska village organization director said, "We are opposed to offshore development because the ocean is like our garden up here in the Arctic for our subsistence way of life."

The Kulluk ran aground in January 2013 and had to be rescued, resulting in the US Department of the Interior ordering Shell to halt drilling until safety problems were corrected. Shell was criticized in an Interior Department report, which cited inadequate supervision of subcontractors by Shell's management, and a lack of preparedness for the Arctic conditions. New regulations were written by the department, and drilling was restricted to shallower waters, up to 140 ft (43 m) deep, and to summer months only, and stricter rules on blowout preventers were put in place.

Environmentalists and oil industry experts agree the area is one of the most dangerous areas in the world to drill, because besides rough seas including 50 ft (15 m) waves, storms, and cold weather, the cleanup and rescue is made harder by a lack of any roads to major cities and no deepwater ports within hundreds of miles, with the closest Coast Guard station capable of assisting in an oil spill located 1,000 miles (1,600 km) away. Bowhead whales and walruses migrate through the area, and the Iñupiat fear an oil spill could damage both their whaling-based culture and livelihood. A statement from the Interior Department said they were taking a "thoughtful approach" in balancing environmental and safety concerns, and respect for the traditions of indigenous people. Susan Murray of the environmental group Oceana said, "Shell has not shown that it is prepared to operate responsibly in the Arctic Ocean, and neither the company nor our government has been willing to fully and fairly evaluate the risks of Shell's proposal."

Shell's Alaska vice president Pete Slaiby said its goal was not, "any kind of grand energy independence", but rather that, "This is all about energy choice," so that the US could replace oil imports from hostile foreign regimes with domestic production. Shell says the Arctic holds about 30% of the undiscovered oil and gas in the world, and exploiting it is necessary to satisfy growing world demand, though US domestic petroleum production is booming in 2015, due mainly to fracking in Texas and North Dakota, and oil prices are falling. At current rates the goal of US energy independence, oil exports exceeding imports, could be reached by 2030, according to the US Energy Information Administration. This turning point could come sooner with greatly increased Arctic oil production.

== Prior to public discussion ==
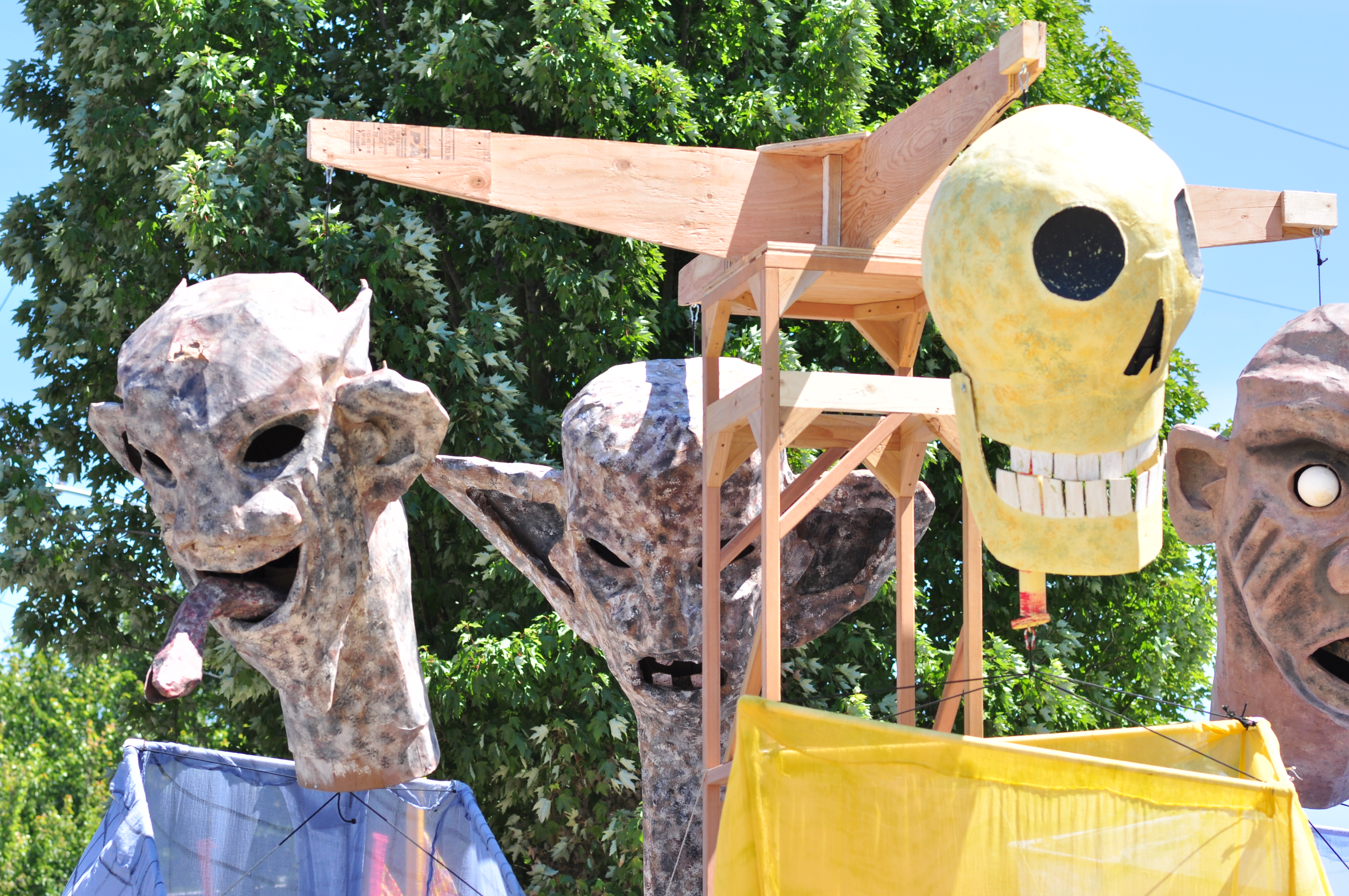
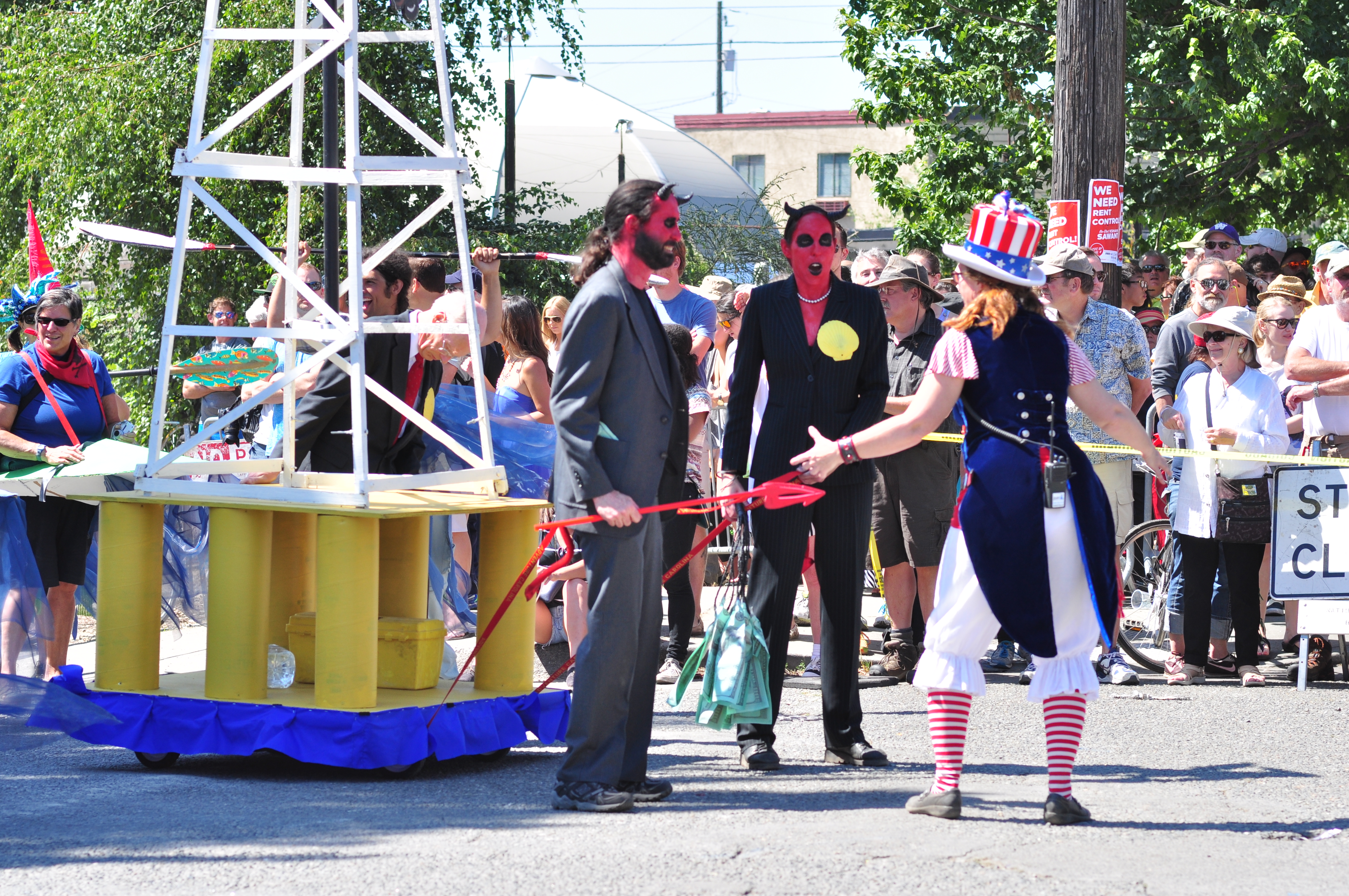
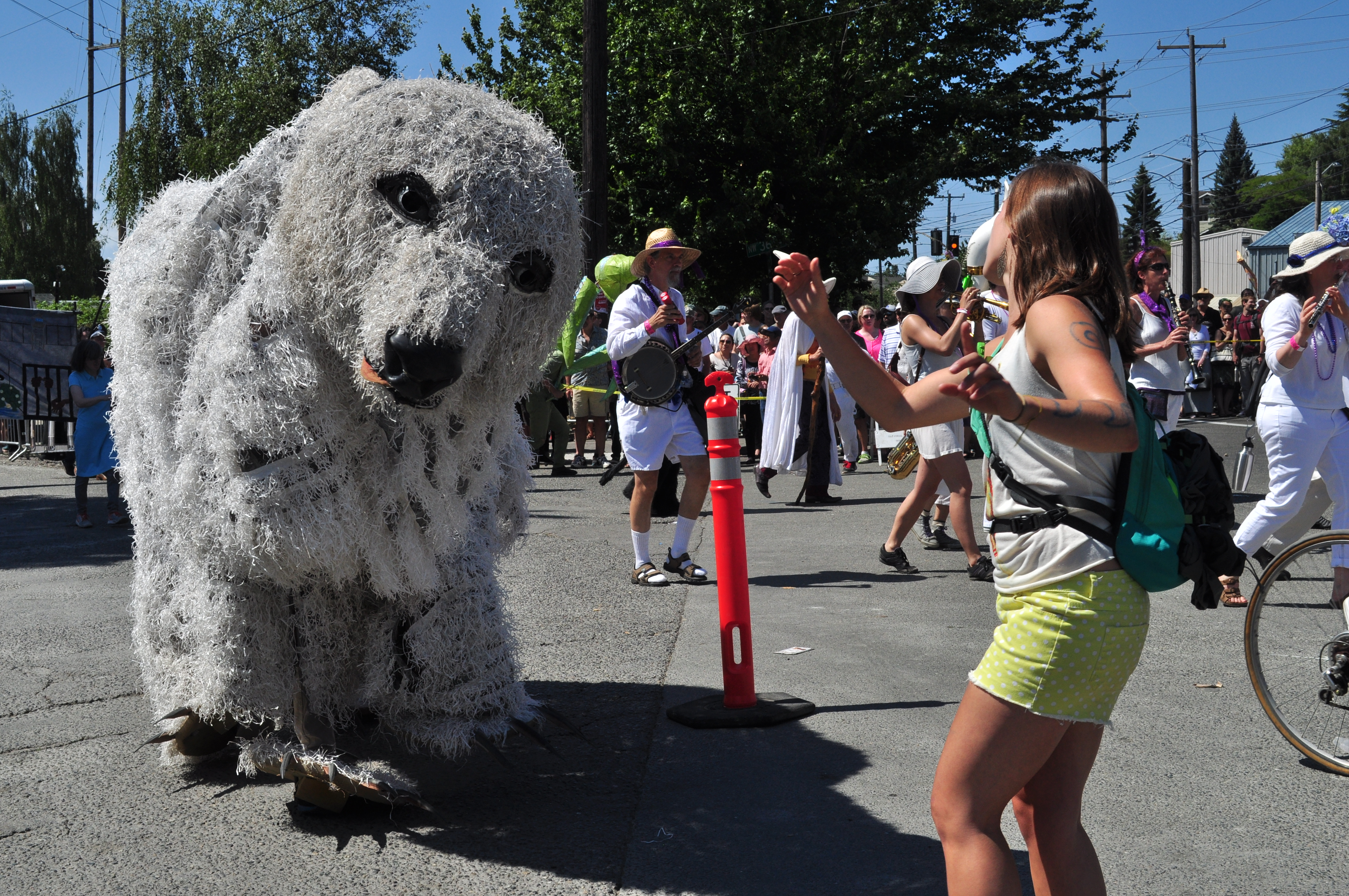
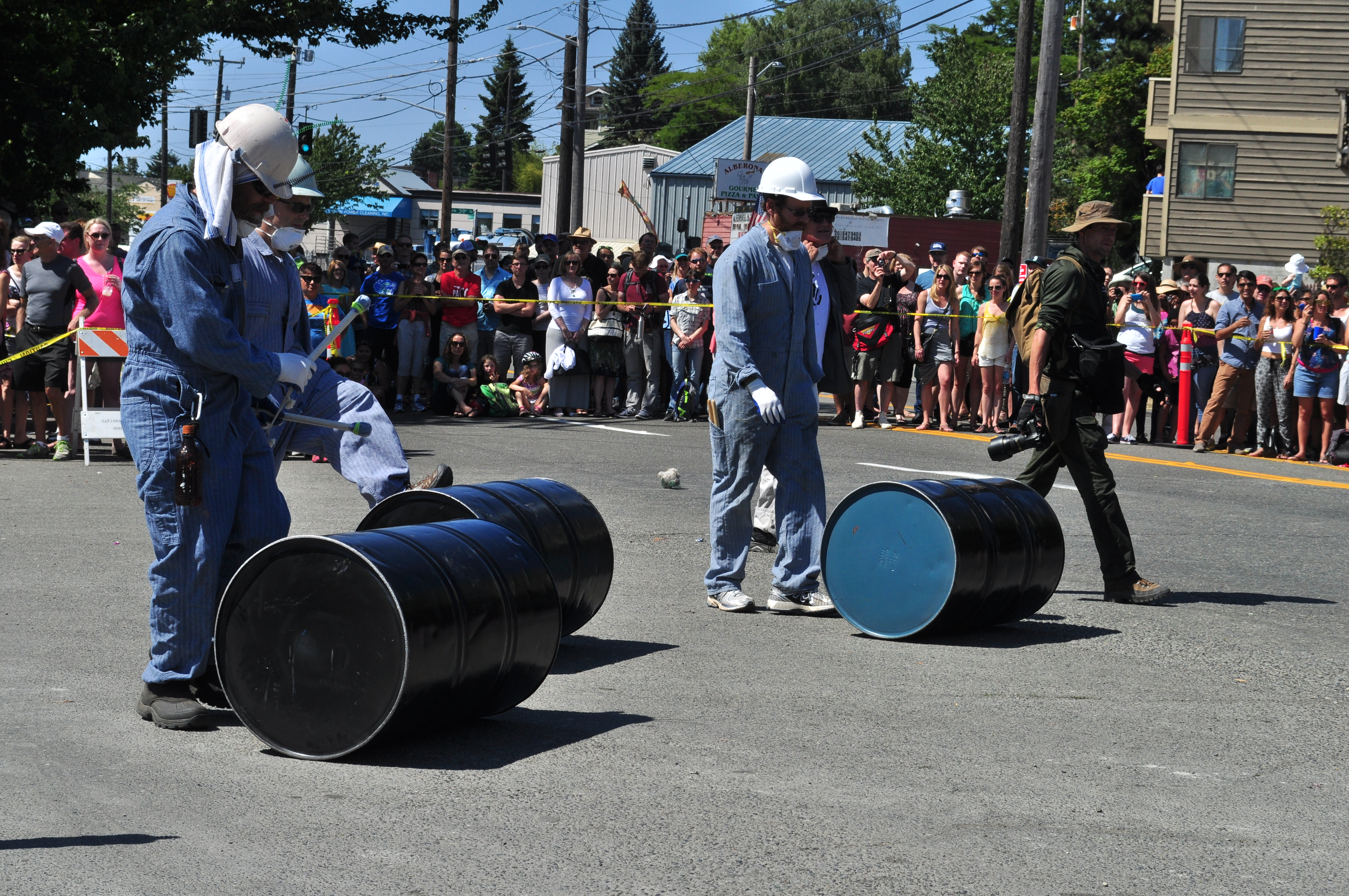
The Fremont Solstice Parade included several groups protesting Shell's Arctic drilling, including giant puppets, polar bears and oil workers

In October 2013, Terminal 5's tenant, Eagle Maritime Services, made plans to relocate. The Port of Seattle decided to update T5, and they asked businesses, including Foss Maritime, to find temporary uses for that terminal. Foss has been in Seattle for over 100 years. In May, 2014, Foss Maritime representatives met with Port staff, discussing the use of T5 to handle modules of a liquid natural gas plant which would go by barge to Canada for assembly. In June, Foss had the idea of using T5 for mooring Shell oil rigs.

The purpose of the new lease was to provide an off-season harbor for Shell vessels conducting exploratory drilling in the summer in the Chukchi Sea off Alaska's northwest coast. The US Geological Survey has estimated the offshore reserves in the Arctic at 26 million barrels of oil and 130 trillion cubic feet of natural gas.

The leases of Eagle Marine Services and Westwood Shipping Lines ended in July 2014, so the following month Eagle moved to the Port of Seattle's Terminal 18 and Westwood moved to Tacoma, so T5 was without a tenant. The new lease with Shell was valued at $13 million. During these months, representatives of Shell, Foss, The US Coast Guard, the Port, and Puget Sound Pilots watched a simulation of an oil rig entering Elliott Bay to evaluate traffic safety and determine where to moor the rigs. In December 2014, the commissioners and staff of the Port were receiving emails from the maritime community expressing support for hosting the drilling rigs. During the last months of 2014, a safety assessment was carried out by the Port, the Coast Guard, Foss, and Puget Sound Pilots, by conducting a simulation of an oil rig entering Elliott Bay.

== Public announcement and protest ==
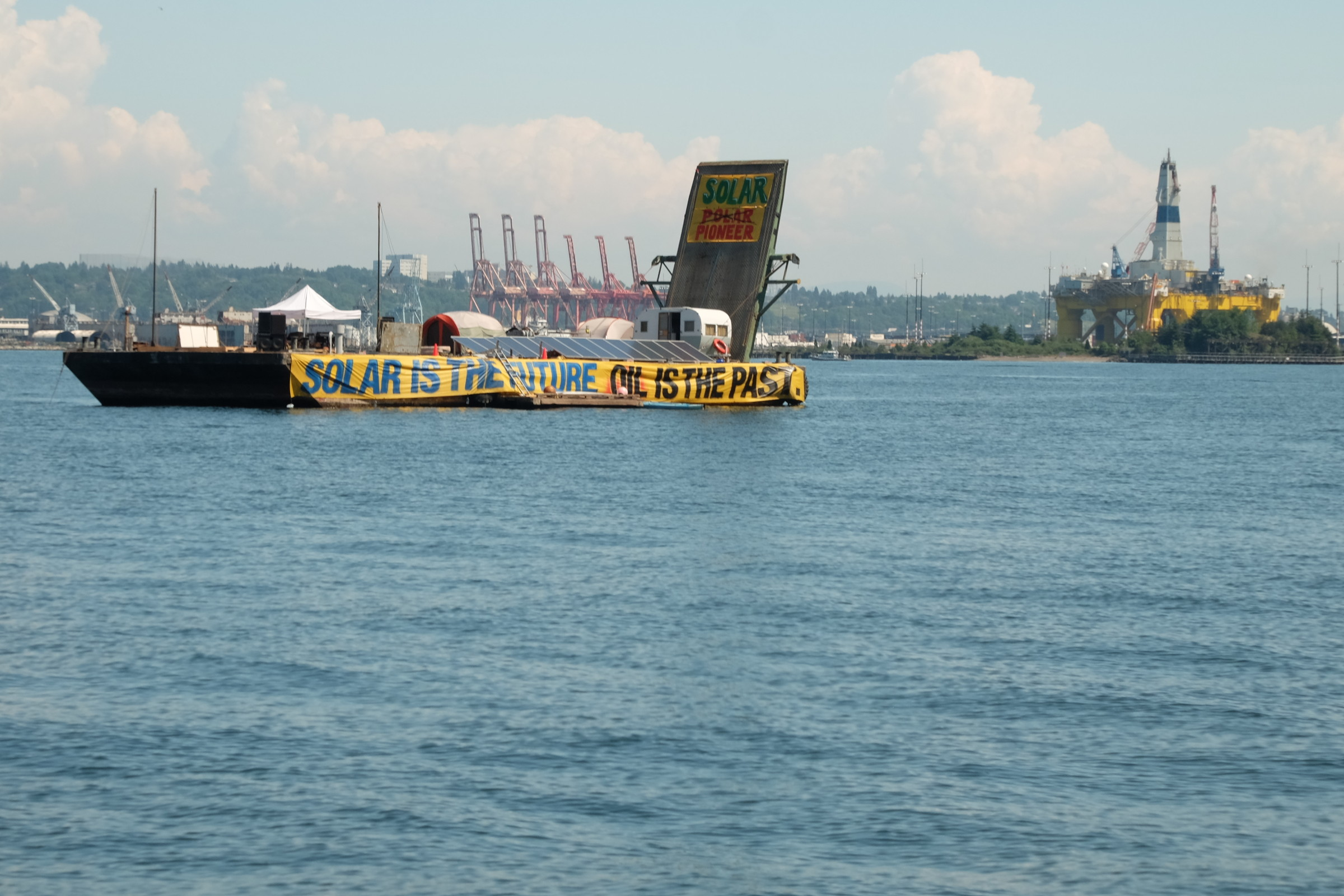
"The People's Barge", a solar and wind-powered multimedia platform opposing the Polar Pioneer and Arctic drilling

On January 13, 2015, the first public meeting North Slope fleet at Terminal 5. On February 9, the lease with Shell was signed by Port of Seattle CEO Ted Fick.

When the deal became known, Seattle Mayor Ed Murray and the Seattle City Council announced they would review it. On March 9, the city of Seattle began looking for ways it could hinder the deal. Murray asked Port to reconsider the contract with Foss, and said that the Port of Seattle must get permits for new uses in order to host the Arctic drilling fleet, explaining that, "This is an opportunity for the port and all of us to make a bold statement about how oil companies contribute to climate change, oil spills and other environmental disasters – and reject this short-term lease."

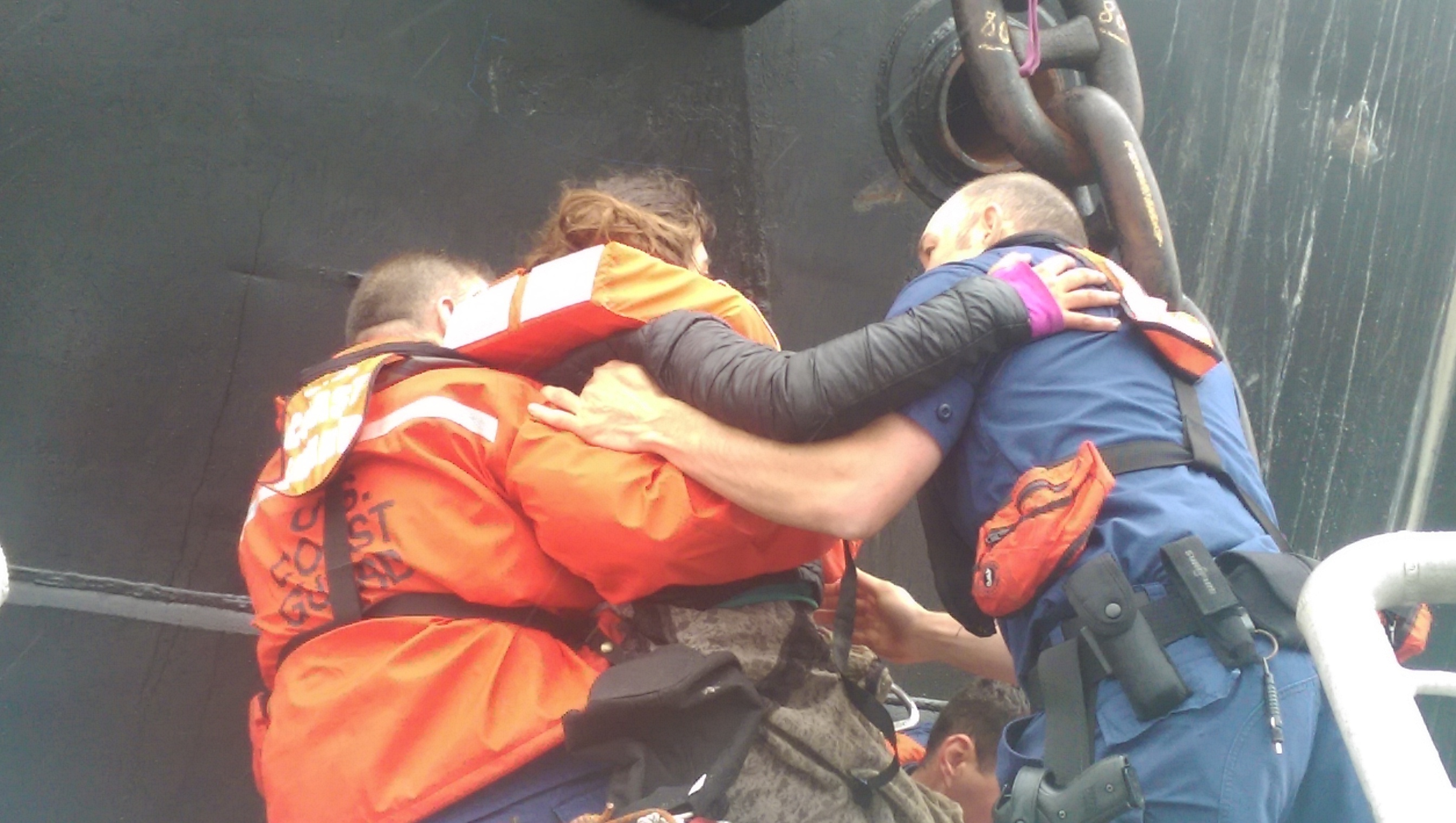
US Coast Guard assists in removing a protester from the anchor chain of the barge Arctic Challenger

Shell's Polar Pioneer semi-submersible drilling rig arrived in Port Angeles, Washington on April 17, 2015, on its way to Seattle. The Polar Pioneer, IMO number: 8754140, was built in 1985 by Hitachi Zosen Corporation in Ariake, Kagoshima, Japan. The rig is 400 ft (122 m) long and 292 ft (89 m) wide, with a draft of 30 ft (9.2 m), and rising to a height of 307 ft (94 m), measuring 38,564-gross tonnage (GT). It is driven by electric motors powered by diesel generators, at an average speed of 6.3 knots (11.7 km/h; 7.2 mph) , and a maximum of 8.2 knots (15.2 km/h; 9.4 mph). The Marshall Islands-registered ship is owned and operated by Transocean, and is ander contract to Royal Dutch Shell.

On May 11, the Obama administration and the Department of the Interior announced that Shell had won conditional approval to being exploratory drilling in the Chukchi Sea with leases Shell had acquired in 2008. Seven more state and Federal permits would be required to commence operations. The decision was a victory for Shell, having worked for several years to overcome regulatory roadblocks, based primarily on concerns of an accident like the 2010 Deepwater Horizon oil spill in the Gulf of Mexico. The dangers of the Arctic seas and weather were seen as increasing the risk of an accident, as well as exacerbating the difficulty of containing a blowout and oil spill, and carrying out cleanup. An earlier attempt to begin drilling was suspended due to safety issues including a fire on one rig.

On May 12, the same day Port Commissioners filed an appeal of the city's land use permit decision, Shell's drillship Noble Discoverer arrived in Everett, Washington on its way to Bellingham, Washington. The ship, IMO number: 6608608 is a Liberian-flagged Sonat Discoverer-class drillship built in 1966 by Namura Shipbuilding and owned by Noble Corporation, weighing 16,000-gross tonnage (GT), 514 ft (157 m) long with a 175 ft (53 m) tall drilling derrick capable of drilling in 1,000 ft (300 m) of water to a drilling depth of 20,000 ft (6,100 m). It was met by 10 protesters in kayaks, along with a Greenpeace motorboat carrying reporters. The kayakers displayed banners reading "ShellNo.org" and "Arctic drilling = climate chaos". The Everett protest was described by one kayaktivist as "just a warm up" for the upcoming event in Seattle.

In the pre-dawn hours of May 14, the Polar Pioneer left Port Angeles with a Coast Guard and tugboat escort. A 500-foot (150 m) safety zone was established around the moving rig, and the Coast Guard issued warnings to protesters ahead of time to stay clear. At least 20 kayaks, and members of the Duwamish Tribe in a large wooden canoe, greeted the rig in Elliott Bay, unfurling a banner reading "Arctic Drilling = Climate Change." Many of the kayakers were freshly trained that day, in rented boats. When the Polar Pioneer arrived in Elliott Bay, it was met by a flotilla of hundreds more protesters in kayaks and other small boats, voicing their opposition to oil drilling in Arctic waters because of the risk of oil spills, undersea oil well blowouts, damage to wildlife from human activity, and the climate change caused by the use of fossil fuels. There were no problems or arrests during the protest and the Polar Pioneer was safely moored at Terminal 5 at 4:30 pm.

"We think that if they're not in Seattle then it may be the end of Arctic drilling for the near future."

— City Council member Mike O'Brien

A counter-protester at Seacrest Park, recently laid off from the maritime industry, said "If these (activists) choose to put me and guys like me out of work for an idea, what are they trying to do?" Foss Maritime said to date, 417 people had been employed by the Shell contract, with Shell paying Transocean $593,000 per day to lease the Polar Pioneer, out of some $6 billion the company was going to spend on Alaska oil exploration. Over the life of the two-year lease, Foss will pay $13.17 million to the Port of Seattle.

Democratic Alaska State Representative Bob Herron said on the Alaska State House floor, "It must be nice to eat cheese and sip wine in Olympia while they talk about the Arctic. But it does remind us of the paternalistic past when the state of Alaska was plundered by people from Washington and other areas ... who covet our resources."

Shell said they were committed to drilling in the Arctic one way or another, but City Council member Mike O'Brien told MSNBC's Chris Hayes, "All the other major players have pulled out of the Arctic. It's only Shell that's left. And the only two ports they were looking at to host this fleet were Seattle and Dutch Harbor, Alaska. And Dutch Harbor's really a problematic environment because the weather up there is so severe. So we think that if they're not in Seattle then it may be the end of Arctic drilling for the near future." With regard to the economic impact on Seattle and the threat of lost jobs, O'Brien said, "There's no doubt that our economy is tied to the fossil fuel industry. We have a lot of work to do if we're going to unwind that and become that kind of sustainable planet that we want to be. ... there's jobs tied to that fossil fuel industry. We have to figure out how we transition away from that. What we can't do today is take a huge step backwards. And drilling in the Arctic and tying Seattle's future to successful drilling in the Arctic is that huge step backwards that undermines what were trying to do."

As part of the ongoing series of protests, activists from the group Mosquito Fleet^{*} rented a 4,000 sq ft (370 m^{2}) barge from Lakeshore Marine Construction of Kenmore. They anchored it off Seacrest Park, christening it "The People's Platform", and equipping it with speakers, video equipment, a huge video screen, and solar and wind power supplies. The project was led by Arctic drilling protest organizer John Sellers, who works for a nonprofit called The Other 98% which addresses "undue corporate influence". The Mosquito Fleet raised $16,400 in donations in 6 days with a YouTube video proposal on Indiegogo to fund the barge rental, at a rate of about $15,000 every two weeks.

On May 22, 2015, the protests spread to Bellingham when student activist Chiara D'Angelo chained herself to the anchor chain of the Royal Dutch Shell barge Arctic Challenger for 63 hours.

* A reference to the historical Puget Sound Mosquito Fleet

== Shell's arctic drilling fleet ==
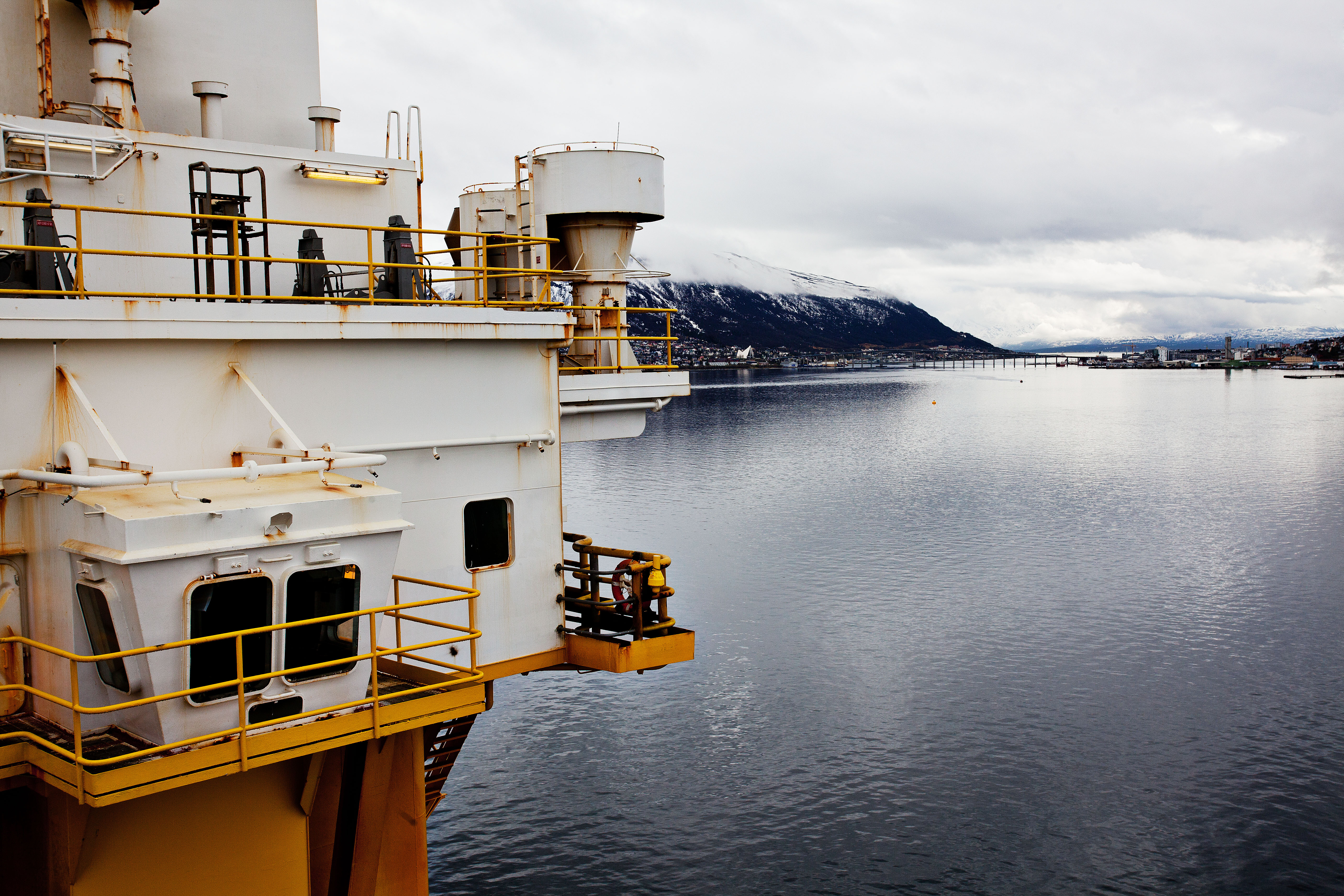
The Shell Polar Pioneer in Norway in 2011

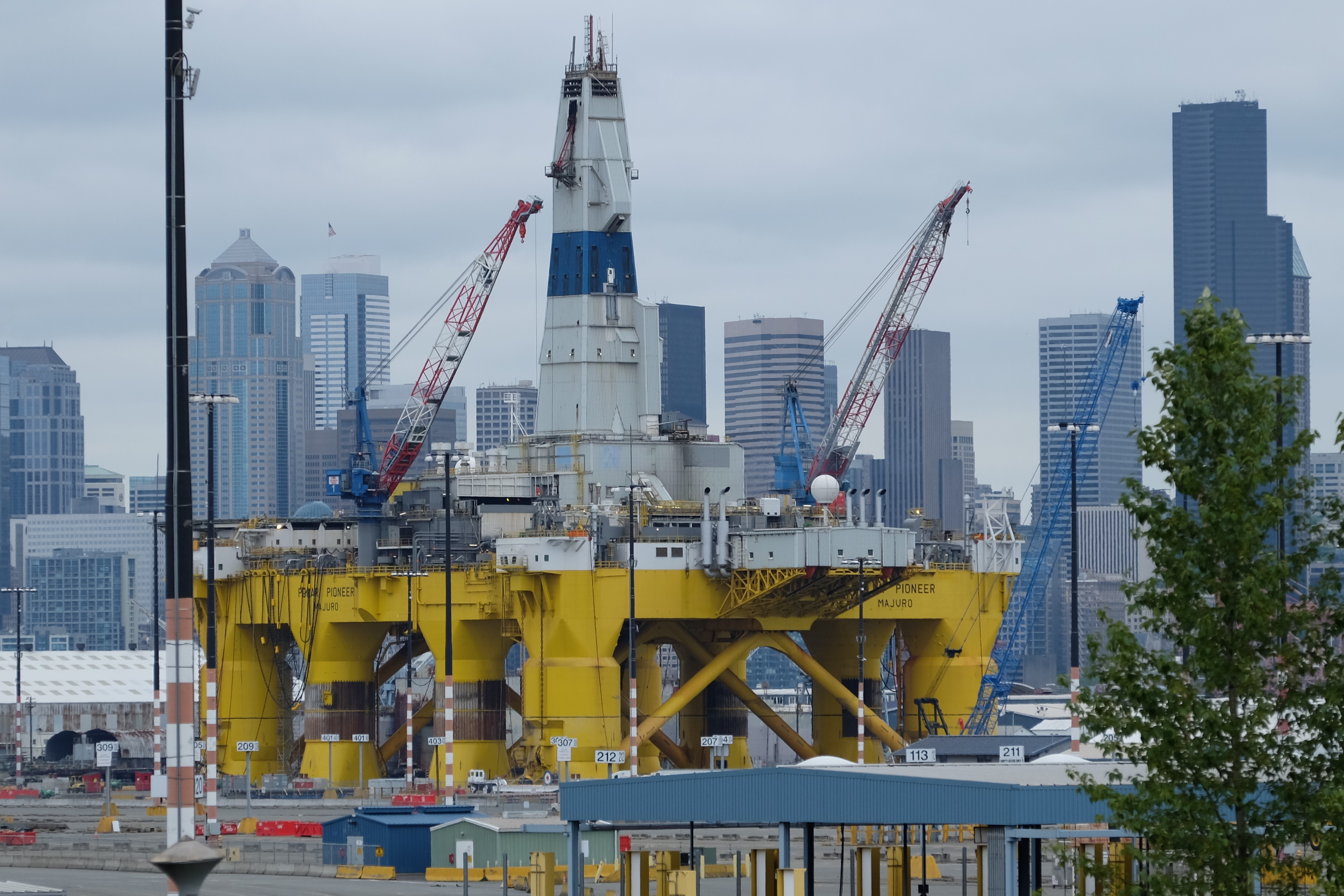
Polar Pioneer at Terminal 5 in 2015

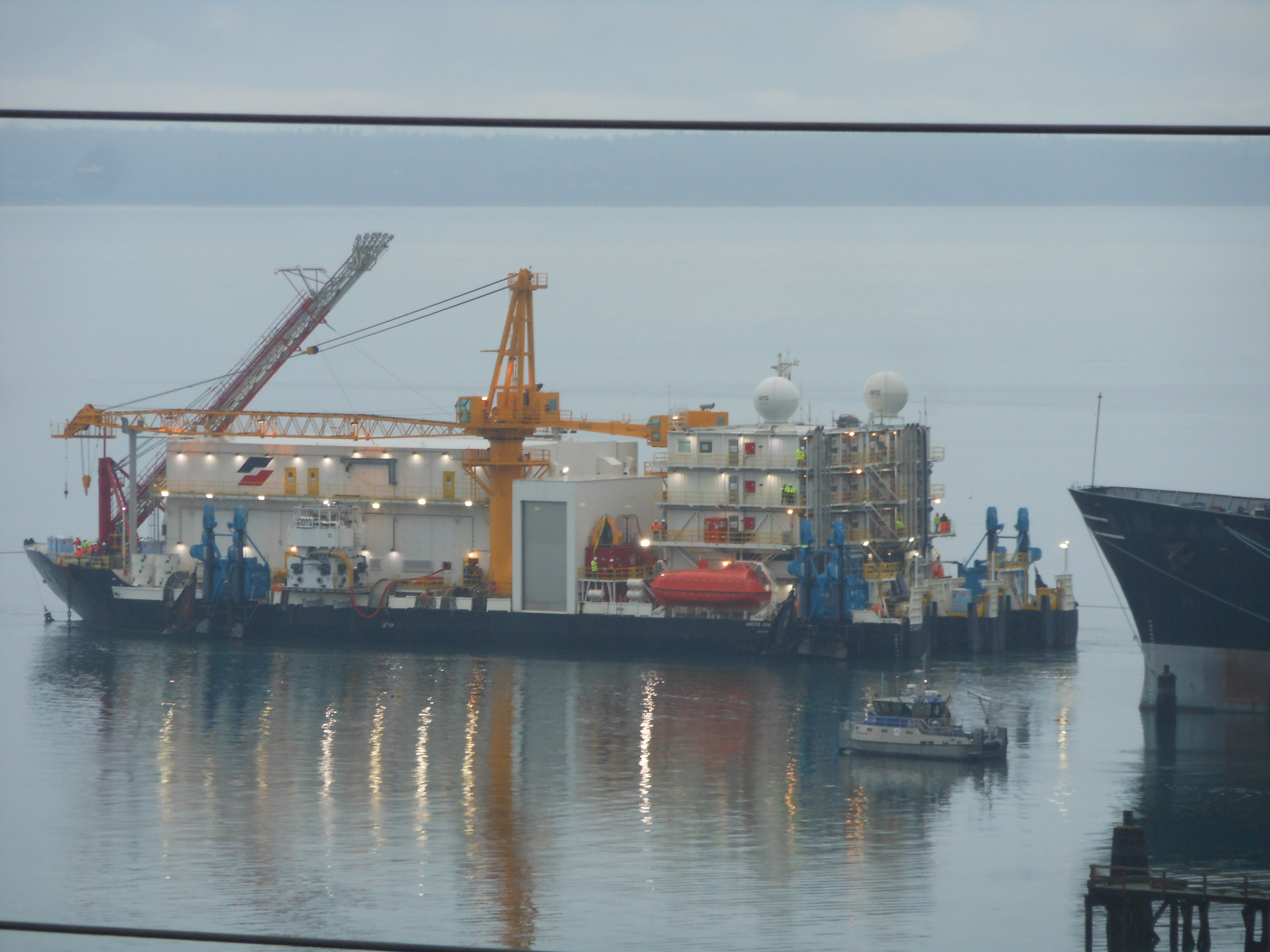
The Arctic Challenger blowout containment vessel, in Bellingham in 2012

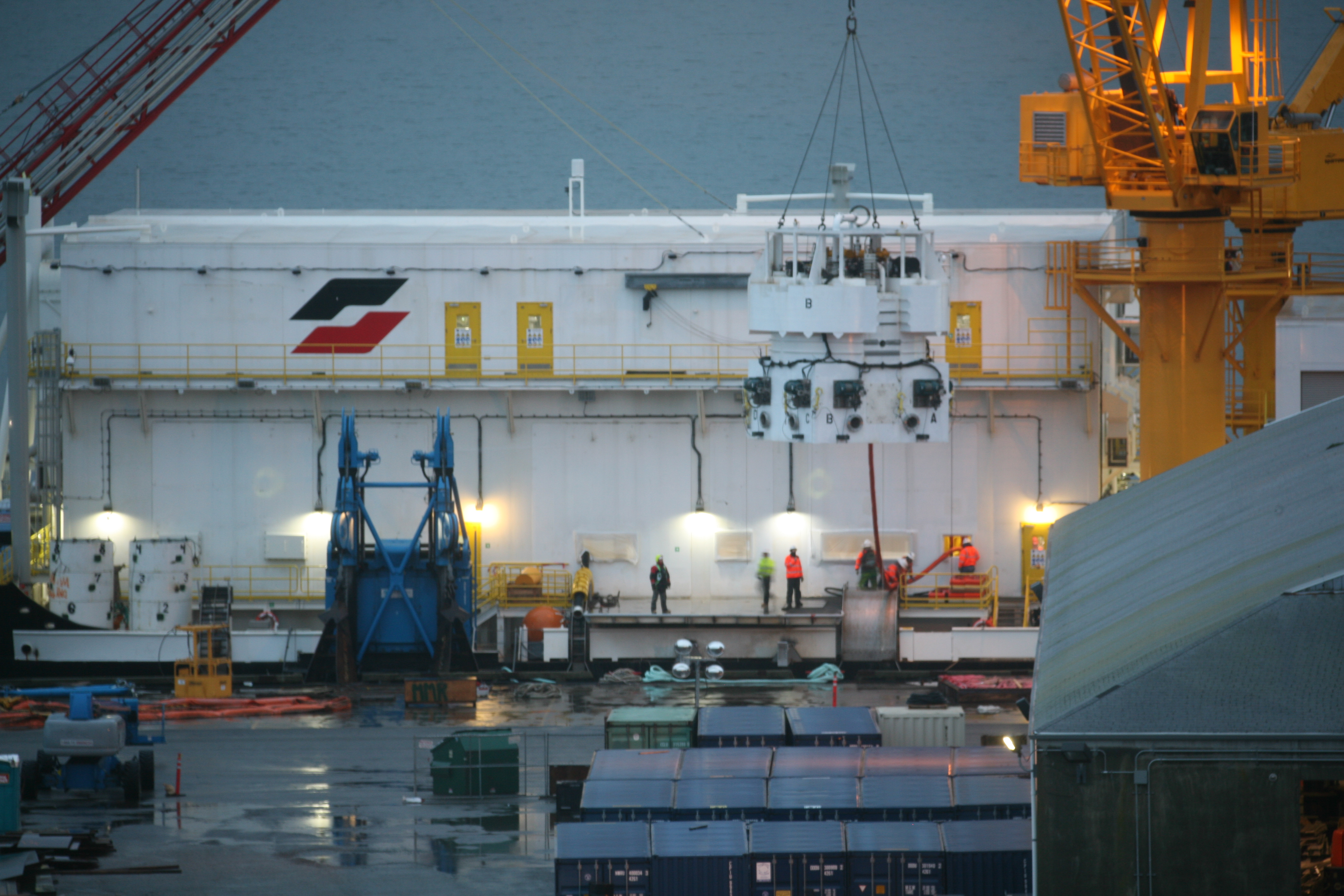
Arctic Challenger's containment dome

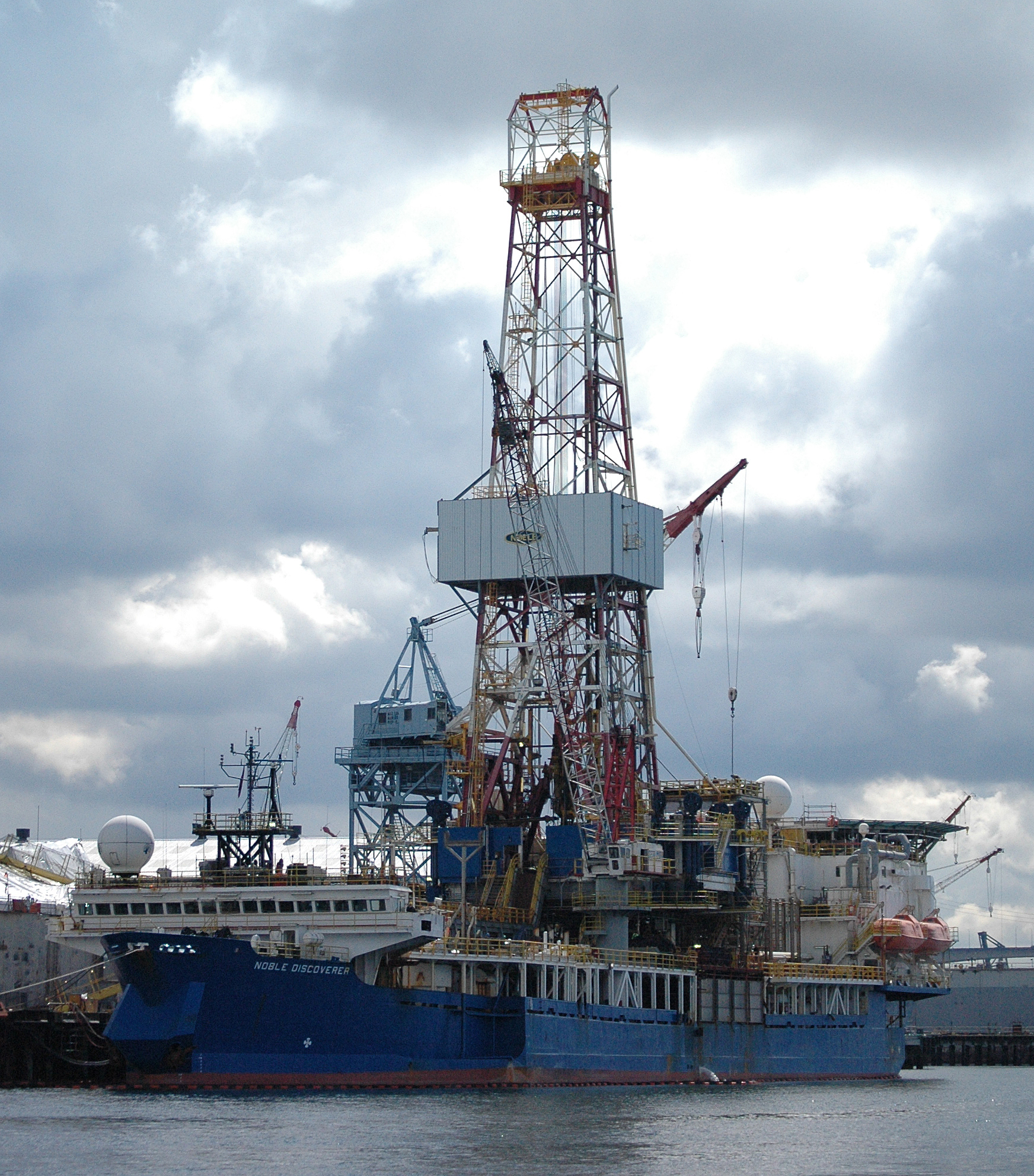
The Noble Discoverer drillship in Seattle in 2012

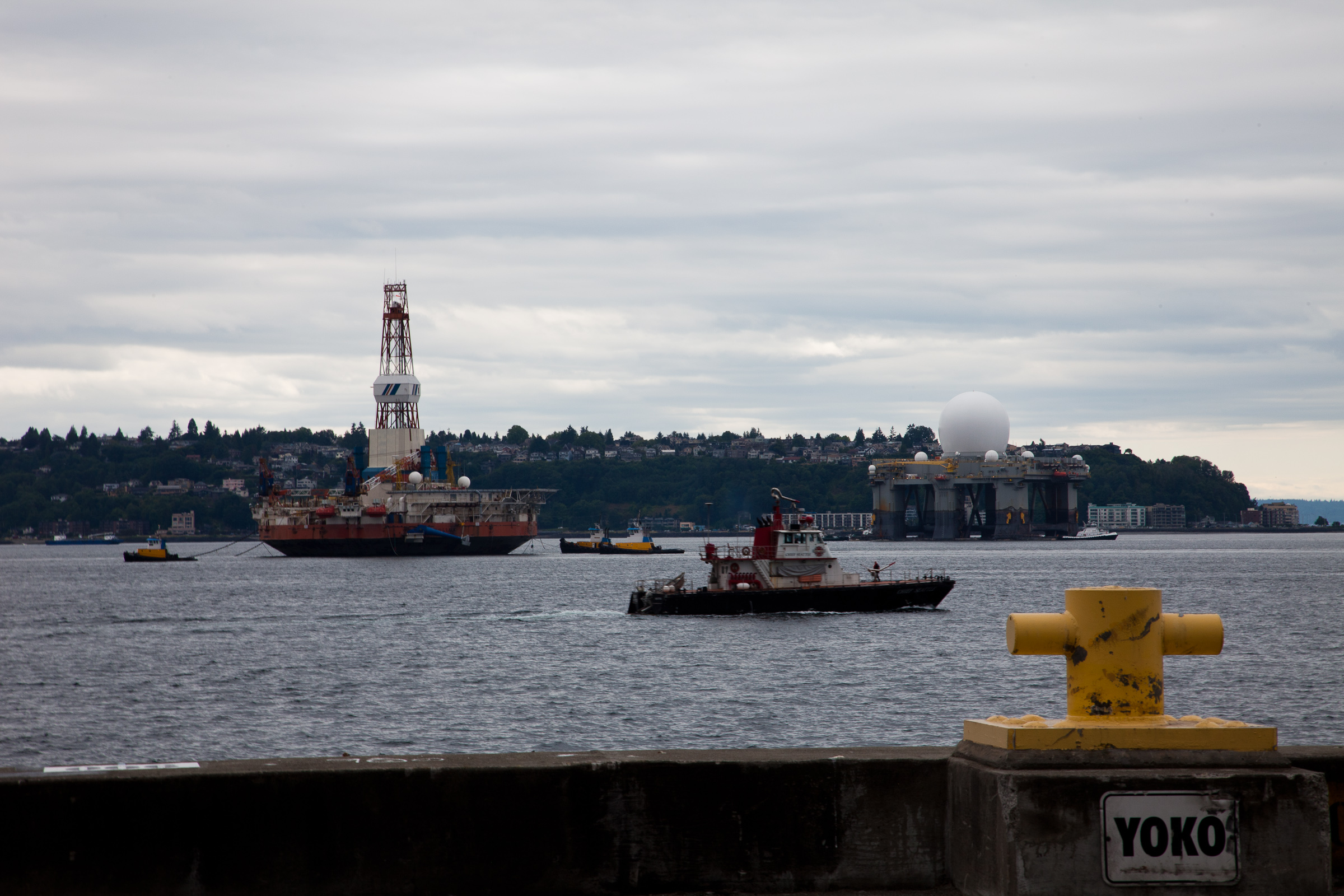
The Kulluk in Elliott Bay in 2012

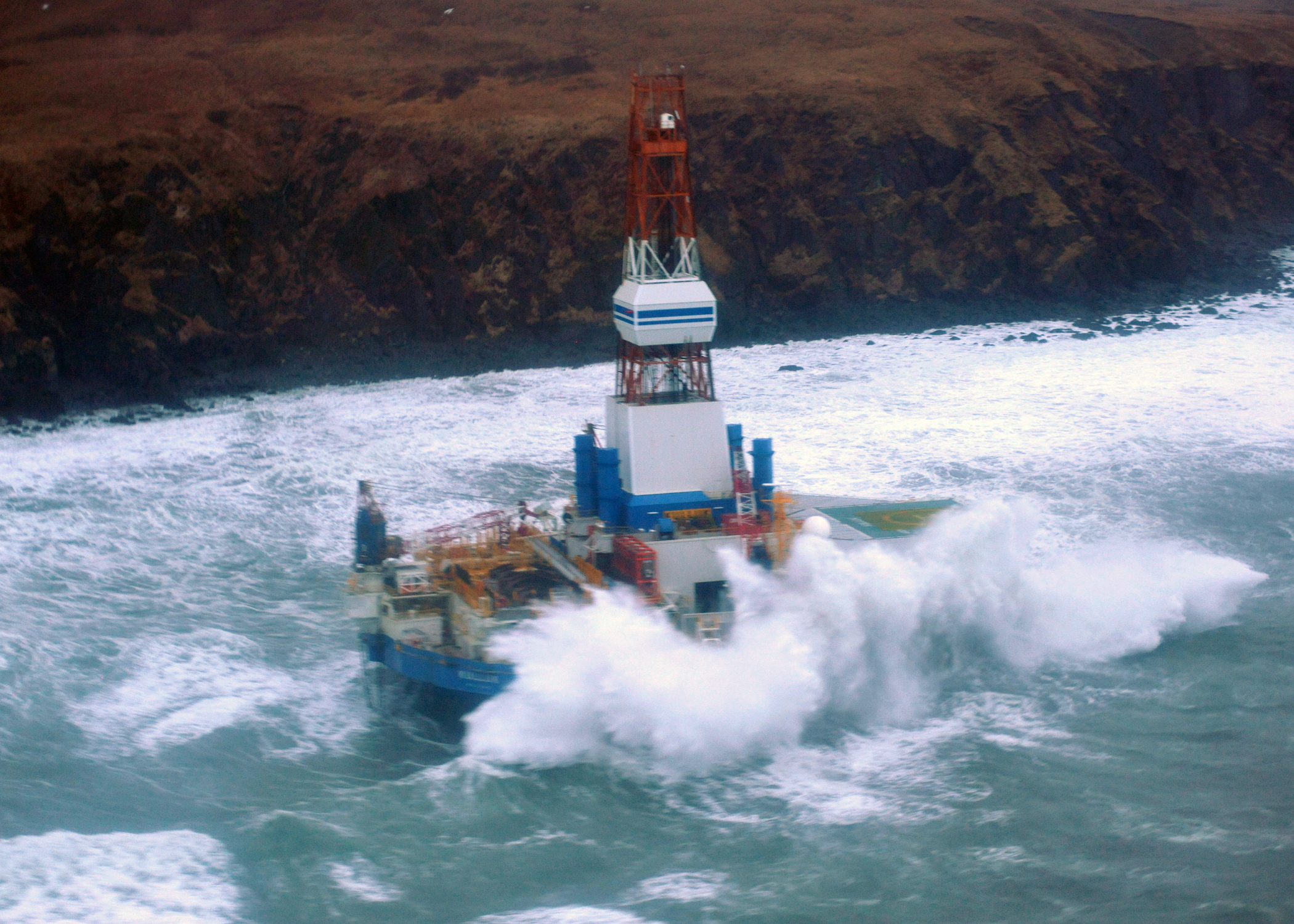
The Kulluk after running aground in January 2013

== See also ==
- Arctic policy of the United States
- Arctic Refuge drilling controversy
- Petroleum exploration in the Arctic
- Save the Arctic
