= Arctic Challenger =

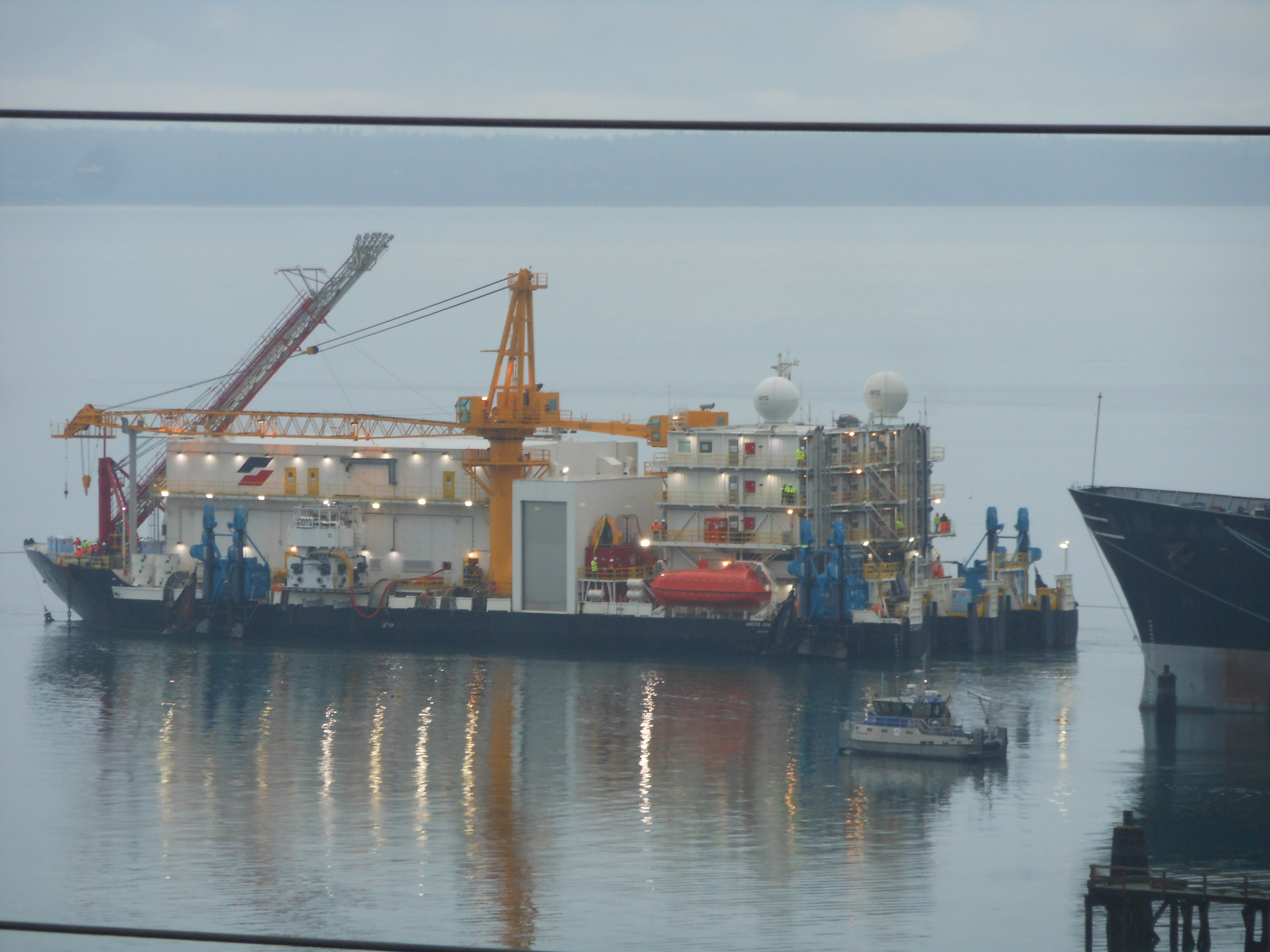
The Arctic Challenger is towed by tugs Arctic Titan and Lindsay Foss out to the testing site at the Vendovi Anchorage just north of Samish Island in Samish Bay.

Arctic Challenger is a barge which has been converted by Superior Energy Services for use in the Arctic drilling operations of Shell Oil Company. This barge is designed to function as a "novel engineering solution" which they refer to as an Arctic Containment System to respond should a blowout event occur at drilling sites in the Beaufort or Chukchi Seas. According to testimony provided to Senator Mark Begich on 11 October 2012, Coast Guard Rear Admiral Thomas Ostebo said the certification for the Shell spill barge Arctic Challenger to operate in Alaska was given on the 10th of October at the Bellingham, Washington shipyard where it was constructed. Ostebo is commander of the Coast Guard's 17th district, which covers Alaska.

The US Bureau of Safety and Environmental Enforcement (BSEE) reported that the vessel was able to meet their requirement for processing 2000 gallons of seawater per minute during testing in March, 2013.

Greenberry Industrial has been contracted to provide fabrication and construction services and then Haskell Corp finished fabrication at the Port of Bellingham in Washington state. Shell Oil Company intends Arctic Challenger and its onboard systems to serve as their "fourth line of defense" against a blow out in their drilling operations in the Arctic that could result in a seafloor oil gusher.

The major component of the project is the containment dome which is designed to be lowered over the blowout to vacuum up the spewing crude oil and natural gas and to deliver those products to the equipment on the ship for separation and processing to ameliorate the damage otherwise expected from a submarine blowout resulting from a drilling catastrophe such as occurred with the Deepwater Horizon oil spill and other offshore blowouts.

The first line of defense is pouring drilling mud down the well. The second line is activating a blowout preventer, which for Shell Oil in the Arctic involves a double shear ram for redundancy. The third line defense is a capping stack such as was used to try to contain the Macondo Well blowout from the Deepwater Horizon oil spill of 2010. The fourth line is the containment dome. There is experience with such technology on the BP Macondo Well in 2010. That attempt failed ultimately because "methane gas escaping from the well would come into contact with cold sea water and form slushy hydrates, essentially clogging the cofferdam with hydrocarbon ice."

Shell Oil Company has stated via their spokesperson Kelly op de Weegh “We are committed to having the Arctic containment system in place before drilling through liquid hydrocarbon zones, and that commitment will not change. We are nearing completion of this first-of-its-kind Arctic containment system, which houses response, containment and separation processes in one vessel. While it's a fourth line of defense in the unlikely event of a loss of well control, it will not be deployed until it meets our high standards.”

From the report on the Deepwater Horizon oil spill by the National Commission on the BP Deepwater Horizon Oil Spill and Offshore Drilling:

Industry’s responsibilities do not end with efforts to prevent blowouts like that at the Macondo well. They extend to efforts to contain any such incidents as quickly as possible and to mitigate the harm caused by spills through effective response efforts.

The oil and gas industry needs to develop large-scale rescue, response, and containment capabilities. To be successful—and to gain the trust of the industry, government, insurers and the public—these new efforts by industry must include extensive planning and preparations; developing scenarios of new types of potential accidents; and conducting full-scale drills and training exercises that involve both people and equipment, and industry must do all of these things continually.

As next-generation equipment is developed, industry must ensure that its containment technology is compatible with its wells. Capping and containment options should be developed in advance to contain blowouts from platform wells.

== Gallery ==
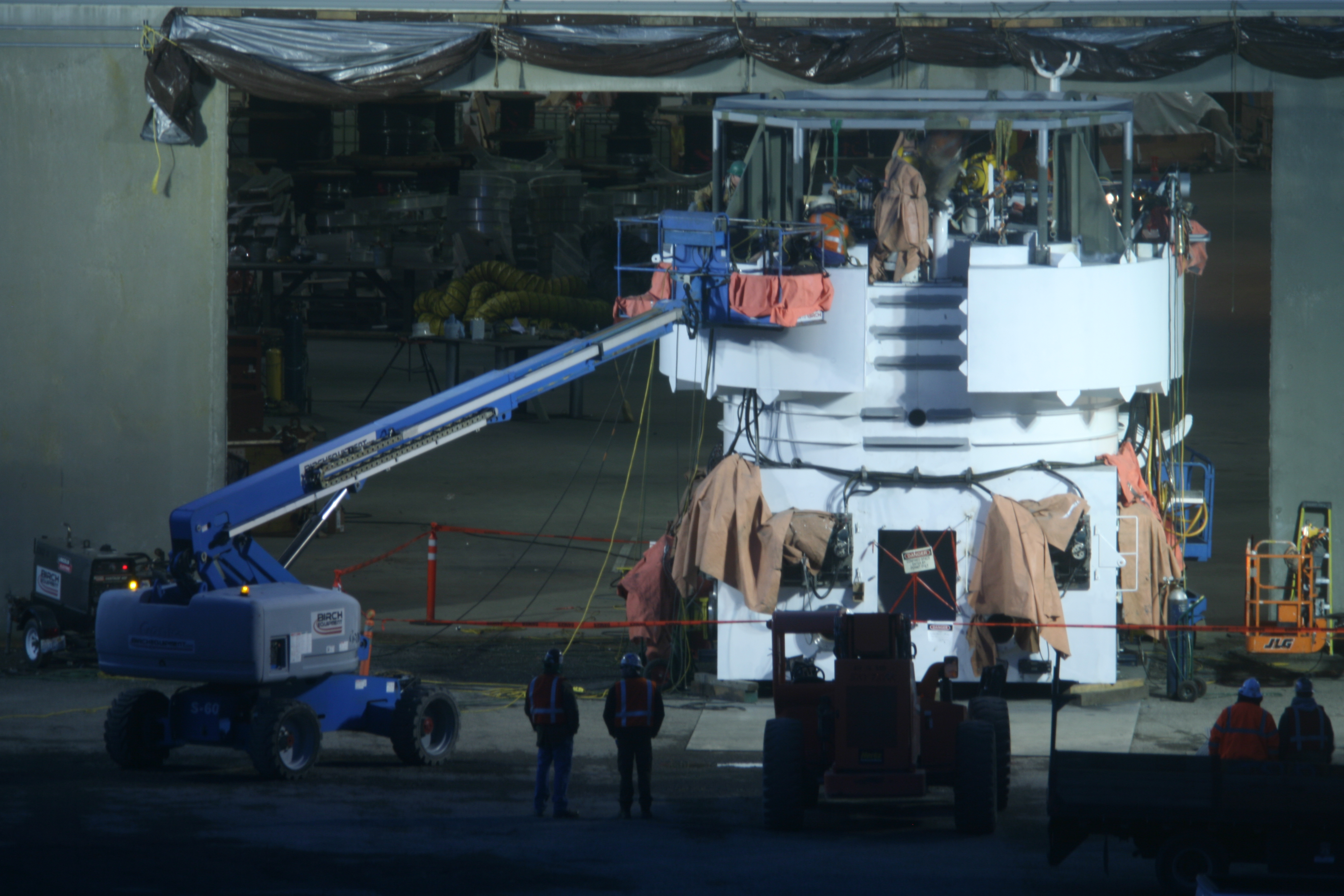
Rebuilding of the containment dome at the Port of Bellingham by contractors of Superior Energy Services, Greenberry Industrial on behalf of Shell Oil Company.

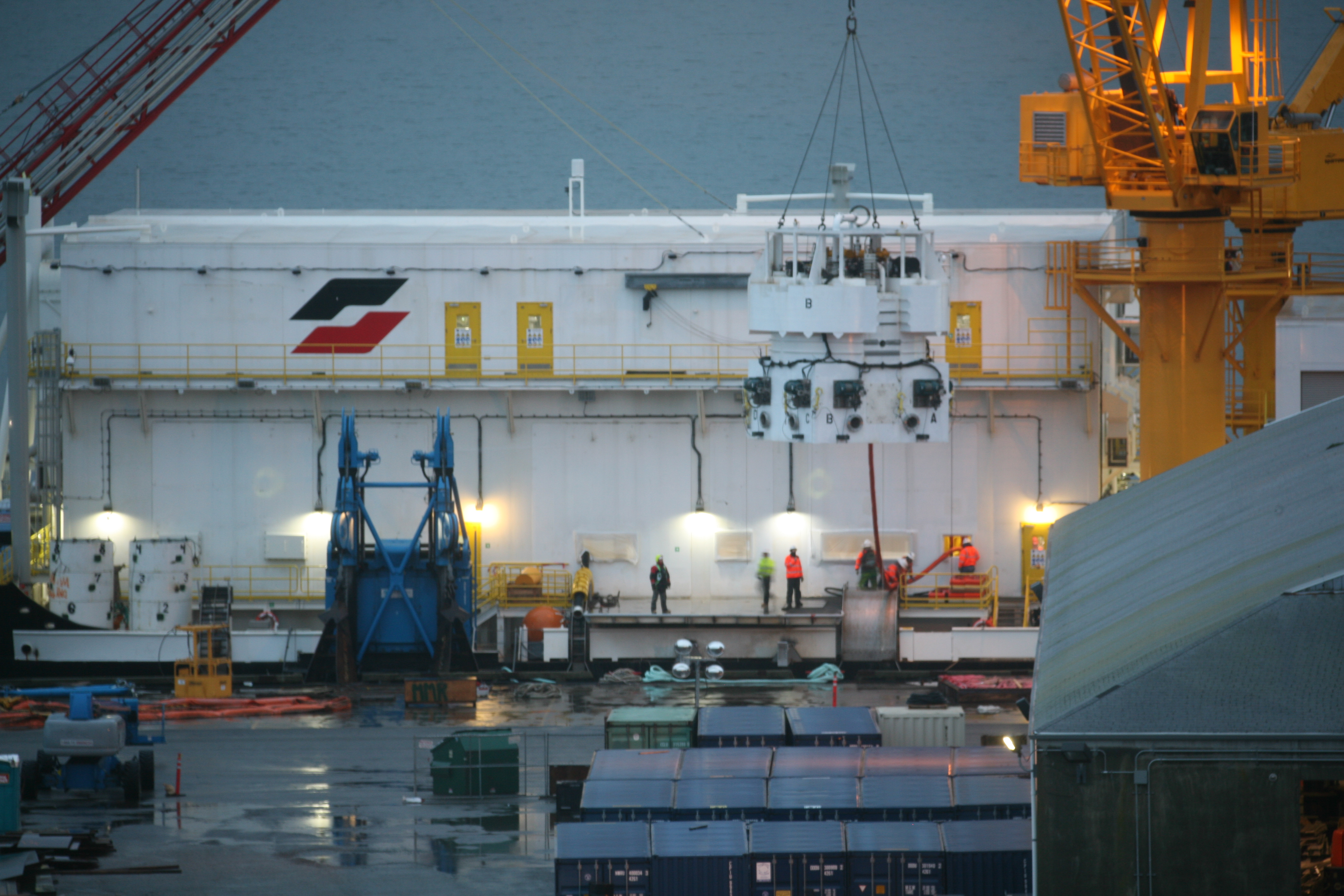
The repaired and improved containment dome is hoisted onto the Arctic Challenger prior to leaving for testing.
