= David J. Lesar =

American businessman

- Born: May 30, 1953 (age 73); Madison, Wisconsin, U.S.
- Education: University of Wisconsin–Madison (BS/MBA)
- Occupations: CEO & chair at Superior Energy Services (2024–present)
- Predecessor: Brian K. Moore

David John Lesar (born May 30, 1953) is an American businessman who is the former chair of Halliburton Energy Services. He was the CEO of Halliburton for 17 years from 2000 to 2017. Trained as a Certified Public Accountant, Lesar spent 16 years at Arthur Andersen. He had spent most of his career at Andersen, where he worked on their Halliburton account. In 1995, Lesar was hired by Halliburton as a new vice president. July 24, 2019 David Lesar was named the interim CEO of HCSC. On June 30, 2020, Lesar was named the president and CEO of CenterPoint Energy. On August 15, 2024, he was named Chairman of the Board of Directors and Chief Executive Officer of Superior Energy Services, effective August 19, 2024.

== Education ==
Lesar was born in Madison, Wisconsin and is a 1978 graduate of the University of Wisconsin–Madison, where he earned both a Bachelor of Science and a Master of Business Administration degree.

== Career ==
As a Certified Public Accountant, Lesar spent 16 years working at Arthur Andersen.

In 1995, Lesar joined Halliburton. Within a year of his arrival, Lesar was appointed as CEO of KBR, in addition to his duties as CFO of Halliburton. In 1997, Lesar was appointed as the company's president and chief operating officer. In 2000, Lesar became CEO of Halliburton. He stepped down as the CEO in 2017 and became the chairman of Halliburton's board of directors. He retired on December 31, 2018, in accordance with the company's mandatory retirement age. He was succeeded by CEO and president Jeff Miller.

He also serves on the board of directors at Lyondell Chemical, is a member of the Upstream Committee of the American Petroleum Institute and is on the board of directors of the American Iranian Council, an organization devoted to the normalization of American-Iranian relations.

== Controversies ==
The movie Iraq for Sale: The War Profiteers claims that Lesar has been paid over $42,000,000 by Halliburton since the beginning of the Iraq war, but this amount has risen significantly since the release of the film. According to The Wall Street Journal Lesar received about $14.9 million in 2010 alone, not including stock options or other deferred incentives – a 20% increase over his 2009 pay package, according to a securities filing.

In November 2014, Lesar faced criticism over his bid to take over Baker Hughes: "the smaller oil-field services rival, in an email to Mr. Lesar, described Halliburton's actions as intransigent and inappropriate".
