= Superior Energy Services =

Holding company for oilfield rentals and well-services brands

Superior Energy Services, Inc.
- Company type: Private C-corporation
- Industry: Oil and gas
- Founded: 1989; 37 years ago
- Founder: Terence Hall
- Headquarters: Houston, Texas, United States
- Key people: David J. Lesar (President and CEO)
- Products: Hydrocarbon exploration
- Owners: GoldenTree Asset Management LP and Monarch GP LLC
- Subsidiaries: Workstrings; Stabil Drill; HB Rentals; Superior Completion Services; Wild Well Controls; International Snubbing Services (ISS)
- Website: superiorenergy.com

Superior Energy Services is an American oil services company that operates as a holding company for a portfolio of oilfield equipment rentals and well oil and gas services brands.

It is structured as a C-corporation and was restructured in 2021 when it was delisted from the stock exchange. Its majority beneficial owners as of 2022, were GoldenTree Asset Management LP and Monarch GP LLC. Superior is headquartered in Houston, Texas. Its business units are located in North America and internationally in order to serve its oil gas company customers.

== History ==
=== Foundation and early years ===
The company was founded in 1989 by Terence Hall, a native of Louisiana. It had an initial public offering in 1995, when it became listed on the New York Stock Exchange. Hall remained CEO of the company until he stepped down in 2010 and was replaced by David Dunlap.

In 2005, in response to Hurricane Katrina, the Company launched a Catastrophic Relief Fund to provide grants to employees who experience property damage and other losses during emergencies and natural disasters. Since its inception, the Fund has granted more than 500 awards totaling nearly $1.4 million. In 2021, when many employees experienced losses during Winter Storm Uri and Hurricane Ida, the Fund made 52 grants totaling $188,865.

In 2012, the company grew significantly with its acquisition of Complete Production Services for approximately $2.7 billion.

=== Strategic transaction 2019 ===
In December 2019, Superior Energy Services announced a transaction to divest certain U.S. land-based service lines and combine them with Forbes Energy Services Ltd. to form a new publicly traded entity focused on U.S. completion, production, and water solutions. The divested businesses included service rigs, coiled tubing, wireline, pressure control, flowback, fluid management, and accommodations.

Under the terms of the agreement, Superior Energy would retain a controlling economic interest in the combined entity (“Newco”), initially approximately 65%, adjusting to approximately 52% following the conversion of preferred equity. The transaction also included plans to reduce up to $500 million of the company’s 2021 senior notes through a combination of debt reduction and maturity extension.

The transaction was approved by the boards of both companies and was expected to close in the first quarter of 2020. David Dunlap was expected to become Chief Executive Officer of the new entity, while Chief Financial Officer Westy Ballard was designated to succeed him as President and Chief Executive Officer of Superior Energy Services. According to the company, the appointment reflected its formal succession planning process and Ballard's experience across global operations, finance, and strategy.

However, in early 2020, the onset of the COVID-19 pandemic and the resulting disruption in global energy markets and capital markets delayed and ultimately prevented the completion of the transaction as originally contemplated.

=== Restructuring 2020 - 2021 ===
In 2020, the Company and certain of its subsidiaries announced their intent to file for Chapter 11 protective bankruptcy which was approved in January 2021.

On February 3, 2021, Superior Energy released a press release stating the company had emerged from bankruptcy. On February 4, 2021, Superior Energy stock, under symbol SPNX, was deleted. This had been foretold by the company in documents filed by the company with the U.S. Securities and Exchange Commission as part of its bankruptcy process.

On March 22, 2021, Superior Energy Services announced the mutual resignations of President and Chief Executive Officer David Dunlap and Chief Financial Officer Westy Ballard. The company credited both executives with leading the organization through a period of significant financial challenge, resulting in a streamlined portfolio of operating companies, positive cash flow, and a strengthened balance sheet with reduced debt.

In 2021, the company also divested certain North American labor-intensive businesses, including assets that had previously been identified for separation in the company’s 2019 strategic transaction, as part of a broader transformation initiative.

=== New direction 2022 - Present ===
On January 21, 2022, Superior released a PR announcing the appointment of Brian K. Moore as President and CEO. Mr. Moore had previously held the position of Senior Executive Vice President at Superior for 16 years.

In 2024, the company announced a change in leadership with Brian Moore stepping down and the appointment of David J. Lesar, who was the previous CEO of Halliburton.

== Portfolio of Brands ==
=== Rentals ===
Superior has three business units that provide oilfield rentals ranging from premium tubulars to highly specialized downhole tools and accessories.

=== Services ===
Superior has forty-three business units that provide specialized products for drilling, production, completion and decommissioning.
