= Oil spill governance in the United States =

Oil spill governance in the United States is governed by federal law.

== Time line ==
The governance framework for oil spills in the United States prior to the Oil Pollution Act (OPA) of 1990 lacked proper consolidation and proved to be inadequate in preventing and responding to oil spillages. A timeline produced by the World Resources Institute (WRI) highlights some key events in oil drilling governance and regulatory system that ultimately govern oil spills in the United States.

- 1978: Congress passed amendments to the Outer Continental Shelf Lands Act, charging the Secretary of the Interior with overseeing the developments of offshore oil reserves, according to a new tiered management structure.
- 1978: The White House Council on Environmental Quality (CEQ) issued regulations regarding federal agencies' mandatory implementation of the National Environmental Policy Act of 1969 (NEPA)
- 1985: CEQ approved the Minerals Management Service (MMS) Departmental Manual, which established the agency's policy for NEPA implementation and issuing categorical exclusions.
- 1986: CEQ revoked its 1978 requirement that agencies include "worst-case analyses" in environmental impact statements for actions with unknown or questionable risks.
- 1989: March 24, the Exxon Valdez oil tanker struck a reef off the coast of Alaska, spilling millions of gallons of crude oil into the Prince William Sound
- 1990: President George H. W. Bush expanded Congressional moratoria on offshore drilling.
- 1990: The Oil Pollution Act of 1990 (OPA) was passed by congress as a result of the Exxon Valdez oil spill.
- 1994: June 30, MMS adopted a voluntary "Safety Systems Management Model" developed by the American Petroleum Institute.
- 2000: March 3, MMS issued a Safety Alert urging offshore lease holders to install a backup mechanism for activating a rig's blowout preventer (BOP) in the event of a blowout to prevent oil spillage.
- 2003: MMS reversed the Safety Alert, removing the requirement to have a backup system for remotely activating a rig's BOP.

Although the OPA provides a framework for oil spillage governance recent events resulting in the BP deep water oil spill in the Gulf of Mexico suggest more can and should have been done in this area. Evidence of this fact is present in the recommendations and investigations present in the January 2011 report by the National Commission on the BP Deepwater Horizon Oil Spill and Offshore Drilling. A further sign of lack of proper governance is implicit in the action of the federal government's 2010 reorganization of MMS into the Bureau of Ocean Energy Management, Regulation and Enforcement (BOEMRE). (The Secretary of the Interior subsequently split BOEMRE into three separate agencies: the Bureau of Ocean Energy Management, the Bureau of Safety and Environmental Enforcement, and the Office of Natural Resources Revenue.)

== Framework ==
=== US legislation ===
The 1989 Exxon Valdez oil spill served as a major focal point in oil spill governance and reform.

==== Prior to the Exxon Valdez incident ====
Six federal laws were in place to prevent and respond to oil spills including

- National Oil and Hazardous Substances Pollution Contingency Plan (NCP) 1968: The NCP established the response system the federal government was to follow in the event of oil spills and release of hazardous materials into the environment. The NCP was a response by U.S. policy makers to the Torrey Canyon oil tanker spill off the coast of England. It has since been amended by the Clean Water Act (1972), the Oil Pollution Act (1990) and the Comprehensive Environmental Response, Competition and Liability Act (CERCLA) 1980. The Oil Pollution Act increased the role and dimensions of the NCP by establishing a more robust planning and response system to improve response and prevent spills in marine environments.
- Clean Water Act (1972) (CWA). The CWA was the most extensive legislation which addressed oil spills prior to the 1989 Exxon Valdez spill. The CWA established requirements for post-spill reporting, response and liability by the responsible party.
- Trans-Alaska Pipeline Authorization Act (1973): Major oil transportation via pipelines goes through the Trans-Alaskan route. Spills from pipelines along this route although inland, could migrate into coastal waters via inland rivers. Hence the act was established to cover oil spills and liability relating to the Trans-Alaska Pipeline System (TAPS).
- Deep Port Act (1974). This was the major statute for deep water spill incidents. It addressed oil spills, cleanup and liability at deep water oil ports.
- Outer Continent Shelf Lands Act Amendments (1978). This act addressed oil spills, cleanup and liability structure for oil extraction facilities in federal offshore waters.
- Hazardous Liquid Pipeline Act of 1979. This act granted the U.S. Department of Transportation (DOT) authority to govern oil spills from pipelines.

Several attempts by Congress to establish more encompassing and elaborate oil pollution laws were hindered by conflicts among interest groups, which mostly produced stalemates. One such conflict was federal law limiting a state's ability to enforce requirements and liability for parties responsible for causing oil spills. The focus of the debates was mostly centred on party liability. An example of the type of debates is illustrated in the question "who is liable in the case of a vessel spill?" The cargo owner or the ship operator/ owner? Another significant issue was the interaction of domestic legislation and international measures. In the 1980s, international agreements being considered would take over oil spills federal and state laws adding further complexity to party liability.

==== After the Exxon Valdez incident ====
After the Exxon Valdez incident, the shortcomings of the patchy framework for oil spill governance was apparent and growing pressure placed on lawmakers resulted in the establishment of:

- Oil Pollution Act (1990). The Oil Pollution Act of 1990 (OPA) is the primary legislation that governs oil spills in the U.S. The OPA substantiated the federal government's role in responding to oil spill cleanups. The OPA made amendments to the already existing CWA to provide 3 options to the delegated authorities through the president. The options include conducting immediate cleanup by federal authorities, to monitor the response of the responsible party or commandeer the cleanup activities of the responsible party. Hence giving the federal government the authority to determine the level of cleanup required.

A second significant amendment is that it makes it a mandatory requirement for U.S. tank vessels, onshore and offshore facilities to establish and submit oil spill response plans to the corresponding federal authority. The OPA requires new vessels operating and transporting oil in U.S. waters to have double hulls. Not all vessels are of the same size and for the same purpose hence the OPA makes provision for exempting certain vessels from having double hulls. By 2015 it has been a requirement that all oil carrying vessels operating in the U.S. must have double hulls.

- Pipeline Safety Improvement Act of 2006. This act was established to improve pipeline safety and security practices. This act also reaffirmed the role of the federal office of pipeline safety relevant governing body in terms of pipeline spills under the DOT.

== Federal agencies responsibility ==
The legal framework for enforcing oil spill governance in the U.S. involves a number of federal authorities. The responsibilities of the agency is split into two categories: (1) oil spill anticipation and prevention and (2) oil spill response and cleanup.

=== Response and clean-up ===
The single most important authority governing oil spills in the United States is the Federal government. The federal government has jurisdiction over oil responses and oil spills that occur in state and federal navigable waters alike.

The location of the oil spill determines which authority responds. Oil spills that occur in coastal waters are the responsibility of the United States Coast Guard (USCG) while the Environmental Protection Agency covers inland oil spills. It is required by US federal law that any discharge of oil that creates a film or sheen on the water surface be reported to the National Response Center. The Center then dissipates information to the USCG which acts as the federal on-scene coordinator.

The USCG is the primary federal response authority in coastal waters, hence having the overall power to ensure the effective cleanup of oil spills and lead actions that prevent further discharge from the spill source. The resulting activities that follow up an oil spill involving federal, state and private parties are co-ordinated by the USCG. The National Oceanic and Atmospheric Administration (NOAA), Office of Response and Restoration works closely with the USCG in providing assistance in technical areas such as consideration of alternatives, Oil displacement tracking and risk assessments.

=== Anticipation and prevention ===
Different authorities are responsible for governing oil spill prevention and anticipation depending on the potential sources of the oil spills. A number of executive orders (EOs) and Memoranda of Understanding (MOU) have established the authorities and agencies responsible for various classes of potential oil spills (Table 1).

| Potential source of oil spill | Responsible agency |
|---|---|
| Onshore, non-transportation facilities | EPA |
| Onshore, transportation facilities | USCG and Department of Transportation (DOT) |
| Deep water ports | USCG and DOT |
| Offshore facilities (oil and gas extraction) | Bureau of Ocean Energy Management (BOEM) within the Department of Interior |
| Offshore pipelines directly associated with oil extraction activities (i.e. production lines) | BSEE |
| Offshore pipelines not directly associated with oil extraction activities (i.e. transmission lines) | Office of Pipeline Safety (OPS) within the DOT |
| Inland Pipelines | OPS |

Table.1 Federal Agency Jurisdiction for oil spill anticipation and prevention duties, by potential sources.

The preventive measures taken by relevant authorities include assessment of facilities to ensure the required standards set out by legislation are met e.g. Double hulls in new vessels and secondary containment in oil holding facilities. Anticipatory duties involve managing the response plans of vessels and facilities to oil spills at various levels: state, regional and national. This ensures proper training of personnel on vessels and facilities to carry out their outlined response plans is also a key duty. The OPA requires relevant agencies to conduct examination to test the anticipative capacities of the parties involved.

== International oil spill governance in the U.S. ==
International conventions have played an important role in creating external networks for governing oil spills in the U.S. international treaties when signed by the U.S. are on the same level as federal law, hence signatory parties must implement domestic legislation to reflect the agreement. This mechanism helps to engineer a number of federal laws governing oil spills such as the intervention on the High Sea Act of 1974. International conventions serve a key role in developing standards for oil carrying vessels from different nations into the U.S. The two major conventions which have contributed to oil spill governance are the 1969 International Convention Relating to Intervention on the High Seas in Cases of Oil Pollution Casualties (the Intervention Convention) and the International Convention for the Prevention of Pollution from Ships (MARPOL 73/78).

The most important international organisations that contribute to oil spill governance in the U.S. include the International Maritime Organization (IMO), International Spill Control Organisation (ISCO) and the Association of Petroleum Industry Managers (APICOM).

== Governance approach ==
The oil spill framework in the U.S. employs a multilateral system of governance where the federal authorities, NGO's and private parties are all actively involved in response and cleanup procedures. Although the U.S. government plays an important role in regulating oil spills, it does not entirely command and control every aspect of the process.

Due to the complex nature of oil and gas operations and limited technical expertise by the government in such industries, industry standard setting and self-policing play a significant role in the governing process of oil spills. This has inevitably led to the network governance approach used to govern oil spills. The insufficient expertise and specialist technical knowledge in the public sector makes it difficult for the government to rely entirely on its personnel hence resulting in public-private partnership known as a type II partnership. This style of new public management to oil spill governance is common in other aspects of environmental governance (e.g. climate change) in the U.S. and differs from the typical bureaucratic role of enforcement the federal government usually play.

The governance process of oil spills relies on input from national, private and international institutions. To effectively implement response, prevention and cleanup procedures a number of public authorities were given responsibility under different jurisdictions. Since the 1970s the number of institutions governing oil spills has increased, indicating a steady shift from state led government approach to a broader and multi layered governance process. The implementation of international oil spill treaties into domestic legislation discussed earlier provides further evidence of the shift to a more governance based approach.

== Influence of public opinion ==
Public perception is vital to comprehend decision-maker's actions in regard to oil spill governance. As many other policy-areas, oil spill policies and governance rely heavily on public perception and prioritization of the environment. After the Deepwater Horizon accident, the American public were asked in a poll to state if the environment or the economy was the most important to them. To this, 54 percent stated the economy, whereas only 34 percent said the environment. Furthermore, prior to the DWH accident, the environment was ranked 17th out of 21 in domestic priorities among American voters. Because of this, the American policymakers had very little incentive to invest in policy changes regarding the risk of oil spills in the years after the Deepwater Horizon Accident.

== Criticism ==
The US Oil spill management regime has previously received criticism, mainly for not being capable of anticipating major oil spills taking place deep below sea-level, such as the Deepwater Horizon accident. Because of this, many scientists and experts on the area, have called for a more flexible approach to oil spill governance, where the authorities are better equipped and capable of choosing from a variety of response-options depending on the severity, magnitude, and nature of the oil spill.

The American decision-makers have also received criticism in failing to address the potential of environmental damage and the risk of oil spills. From 1996 and up until the Deepwater Horizon accident, only 1 congressional hearing regarding regulation of offshore drilling took place, meanwhile both the Clinton, Bush and Obama administrations approved of legislation seeking to expand off-shore oil drilling in the Gulf of Mexico.

== See also ==
- Environmental governance
- Environmental issues with petroleum
- Global governance
- List of oil spills
- National Oil and Hazardous Substances Pollution Contingency Plan
- Ohmsett (Oil and Hazardous Materials Simulated Environmental Test Tank)
- United States energy law
- United States offshore drilling debate
