= Oil spill =

Release of petroleum into the environment

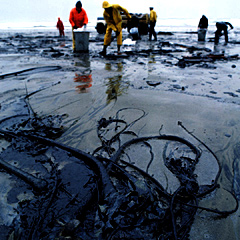
Kelp after an oil spill

An oil spill is the release of a liquid petroleum hydrocarbon into the environment, especially the marine ecosystem, due to human activity, and is a form of pollution. The term usually refers to marine oil spills, where oil is released into the ocean or coastal waters, but spills may also occur on land. Oil spills can result from the release of crude oil from tankers, offshore platforms, drilling rigs, and wells. They may also involve spills of refined petroleum products, such as gasoline and diesel fuel, as well as their by-products. Additionally, heavier fuels used by large ships, such as bunker fuel, or spills of any oily refuse or waste oil, contribute to such incidents. These spills can have severe environmental and economic consequences.

Oil spills penetrate into the structure of the plumage of birds and the fur of mammals, reducing its insulating ability, and making them more vulnerable to temperature fluctuations and much less buoyant in the water. Cleanup and recovery from an oil spill is difficult and depends upon many factors, including the type of oil spilled, the temperature of the water (affecting evaporation and biodegradation), and the types of shorelines and beaches involved. Spills may take weeks, months or even years to clean up.

To prepare for spills, responders use Environmental Sensitivity Index (ESI) maps, which show in advance which coastal areas and resources are most at risk from oil. The maps rank shorelines on a 10-point scale by how easy they are to clean, how long oil would last there, and how sensitive they are. Mangroves and marshes rank among the most sensitive. They also mark biological resources, such as birds, marine mammals and fish, and human-use resources, such as beaches, marinas and cultural sites. First used in 1979 after a spill in the Gulf of Mexico, ESI maps are now built with GIS and are mainly used in contingency planning, to set priorities for protection and choose clean-up methods.

Oil spills can have significant environmental, economic and social effects. The economic damage to sectors like tourism and fishing can be disproportionate to environmental damage. As a result, oil spill accidents have initiated intense media attention and political action, bringing many together in a political struggle concerning government response to oil spills and what actions can best prevent them from happening.

== Human impacts ==
Oil spills increase fire hazards and can cause some health problems. The fire resulting from the Lac-Mégantic derailment killed 47 and destroyed half of the town's centre.

Spilled oil can also contaminate drinking water supplies. For example, in 2013 two oil spills contaminated water supplies for 300,000 in Miri, Malaysia; 80,000 people in Coca, Ecuador. In 2000, springs were contaminated by an oil spill in Clark County, Kentucky.

== Environmental effects ==
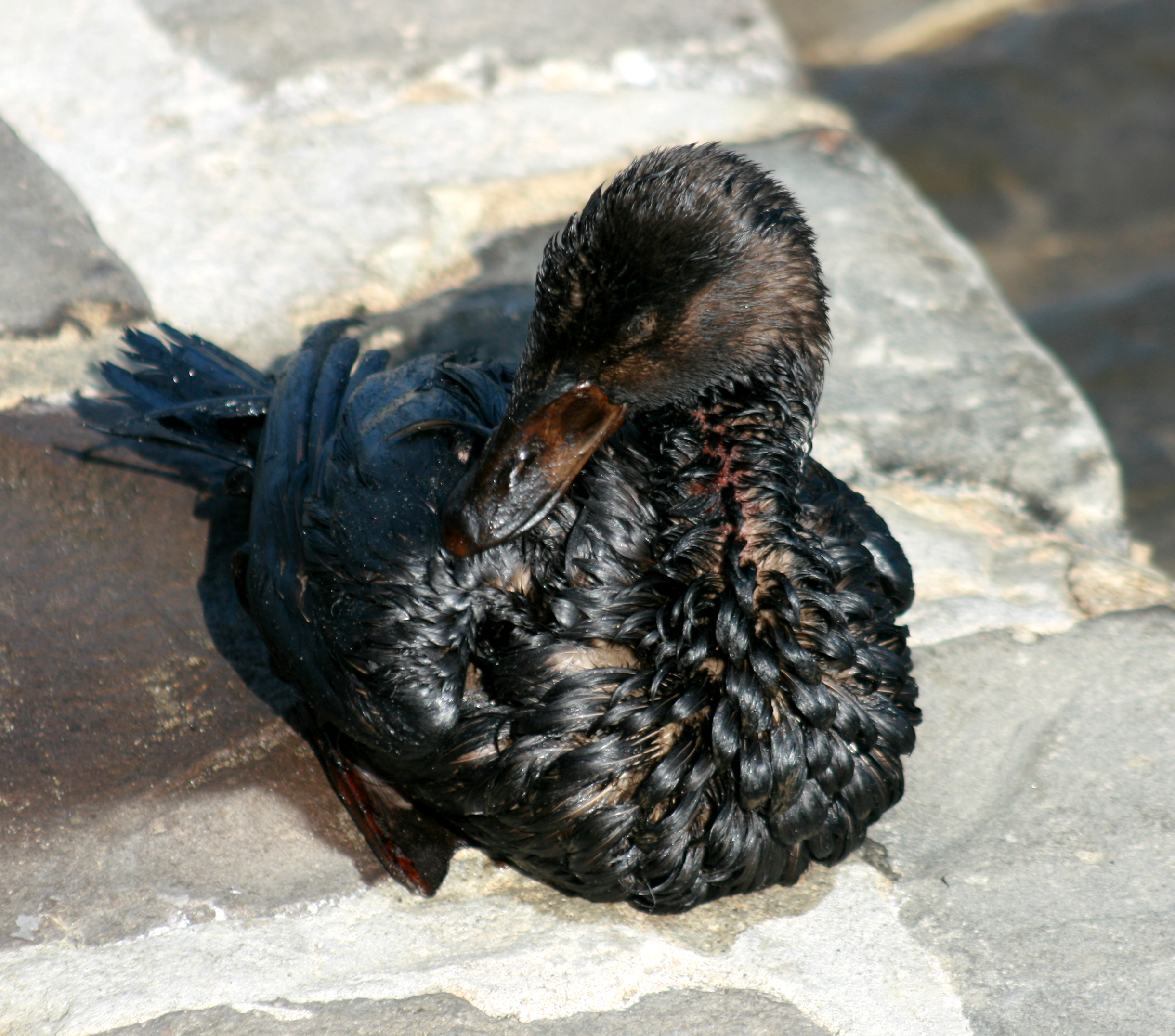
A surf scoter covered in oil as a result of the 2007 San Francisco Bay oil spill

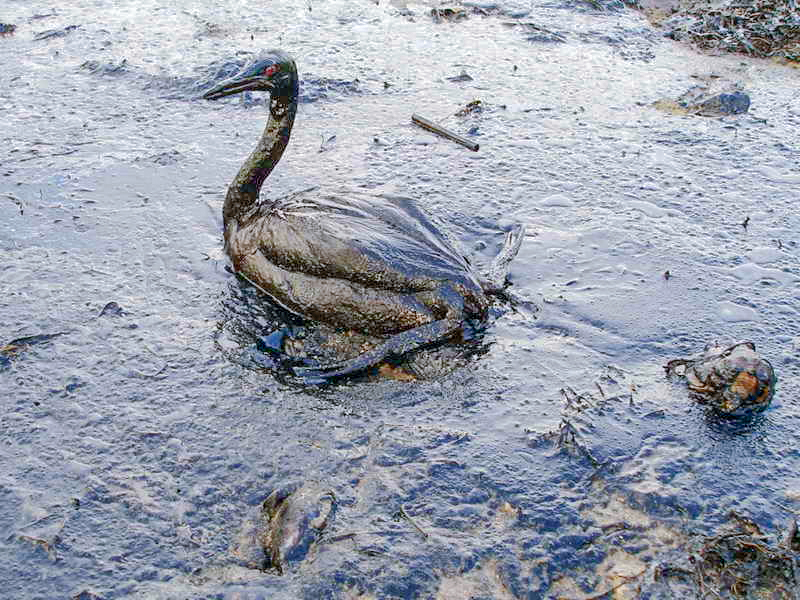
A bird covered in oil from the Black Sea oil spill

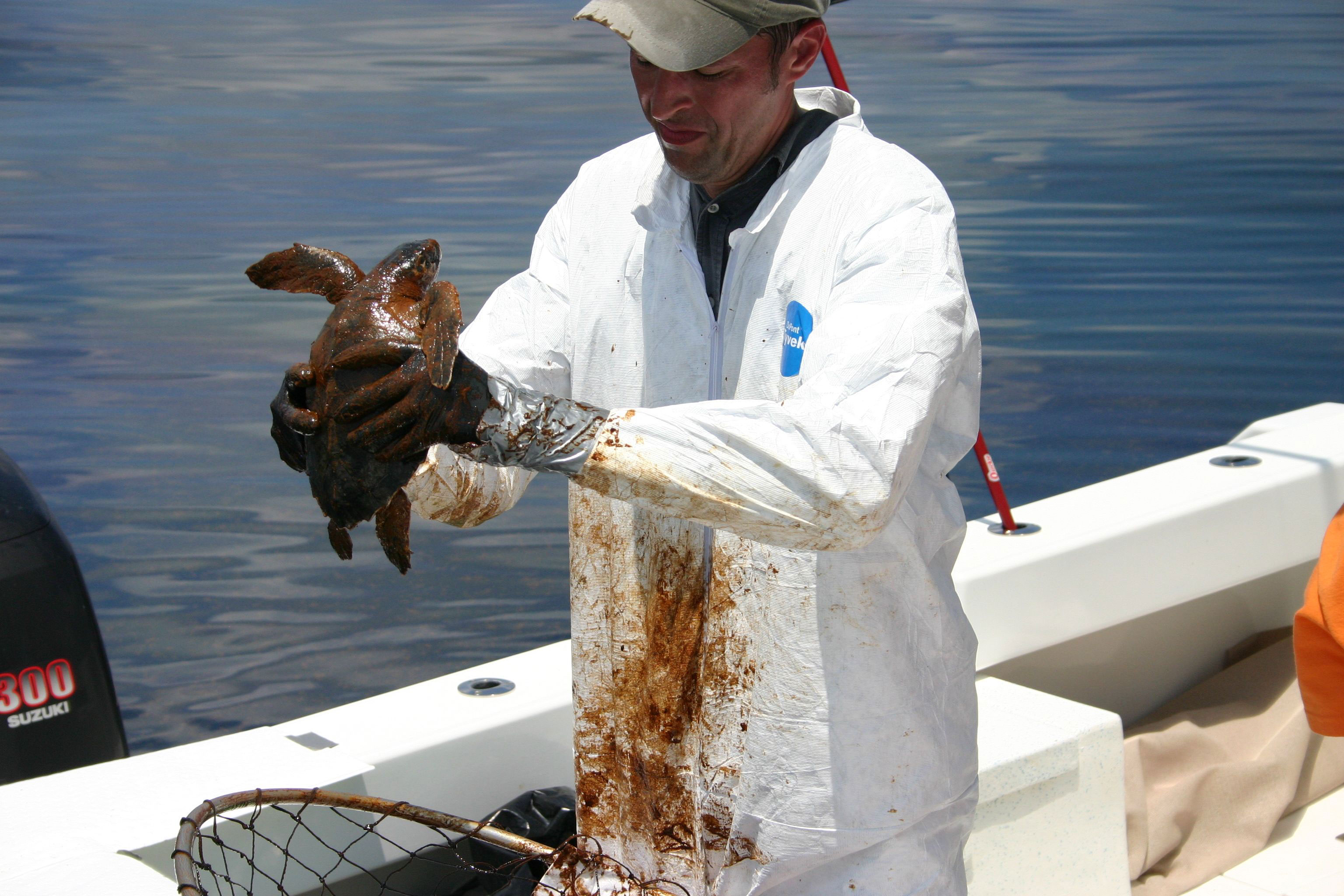
A veterinarian prepares to clean an oiled Kemp's Ridley turtle after the BP Gulf of Mexico oil spill.

=== Animals ===
The threat posed to birds, fish, shellfish and crustaceans from spilled oil was known in England in the 1920s, largely through observations made in Yorkshire. The subject was also explored in a scientific paper produced by the National Academy of Sciences in the US in 1974 which considered impacts to fish, crustaceans and molluscs. The paper was limited to 100 copies and was described as a draft document, not to be cited.

In general, spilled oil can affect animals and plants in two ways: direct from the oil and from the response or cleanup process. Oil penetrates into the structure of the plumage of birds and the fur of mammals, reducing their insulating ability, and making them more vulnerable to temperature fluctuations and much less buoyant in the water.

Animals who rely on scent to find their babies or mothers cannot do so due to the strong scent of the oil. This causes a baby to be rejected and abandoned, leaving the babies to starve and eventually die. Oil can impair a bird's ability to fly, preventing it from foraging or escaping from predators. As they preen, birds may ingest the oil coating their feathers, irritating the digestive tract, altering liver function, and causing kidney damage. Together with their diminished foraging capacity, this can rapidly result in dehydration and metabolic imbalance. Some birds exposed to petroleum also experience changes in their hormonal balance, including changes in their luteinizing protein. The majority of birds affected by oil spills die from complications without human intervention. Some studies have suggested that less than one percent of oil-soaked birds survive, even after cleaning, although the survival rate can also exceed ninety percent, as in the case of the MV Treasure oil spill. Oil spills and oil dumping events have been impacting sea birds since at least the 1920s and was understood to be a global problem in the 1930s.

Heavily furred marine mammals exposed to oil spills are affected in similar ways. Oil coats the fur of sea otters and seals, reducing its insulating effect, leading to fluctuations in body temperature and hypothermia. Oil can also blind an animal, leaving it defenseless. The ingestion of oil causes dehydration and impairs the digestive process. Animals can be poisoned, and may die from oil entering the lungs or liver.

=== Air ===
In addition, oil spills can also harm air quality. The chemicals in crude oil are mostly hydrocarbons that contains toxic chemicals such as benzenes, toluene, poly-aromatic hydrocarbons and oxygenated polycyclic aromatic hydrocarbons. These chemicals can introduce adverse health effects when being inhaled into the human body. In addition, these chemicals can be oxidized by oxidants in the atmosphere to form fine particulate matter after they evaporate into the atmosphere. These particulates can penetrate lungs and carry toxic chemicals into the human body. Burning surface oil can also be a source for pollution such as soot particles. During the cleanup and recovery process, it will also generate air pollutants such as nitric oxides and ozone from ships. Lastly, bubble bursting can also be a generation pathway for particulate matter during an oil spill. During the Deepwater Horizon oil spill, significant air quality issues were found on the Gulf Coast, which is downwind of the DWH oil spill. Air quality monitoring data showed that criteria pollutants had exceeded the health-based standard in the coastal regions.

== Sources and rate of occurrence ==
Oil spills can be caused by human error, natural disasters, technical failures or deliberate releases. It is estimated that 30–50% of all oil spills are directly or indirectly caused by human error, with approximately 20–40% of oil spills being attributed to equipment failure or malfunction. Causes of oil spills are further distinguished between deliberate releases, such as operational discharges or acts of war and accidental releases. Accidental oil spills are in the focus of the literature, although some of the largest oil spills ever recorded, the Gulf War Oil Spill (sea based) and Kuwaiti Oil Fires (land based) were deliberate acts of war. The academic study of sources and causes of oil spills identifies vulnerable points in oil transportation infrastructure and calculates the likelihood of oil spills happening. This can then guide prevention efforts and regulation policies

=== Natural seeps ===
Around 40–50% of all oil released into the oceans stems from natural seeps from seafloor rocks. This corresponds to approximately 600,000 tons annually on a global level. While natural seeps are the single largest source of oil spills, they are considered less problematic because ecosystems have adapted to such regular releases. For instance, on sites of natural oil seeps, ocean bacteria have evolved to digest oil molecules.

=== Oil tankers and vessels ===
Vessels can be the source of oil spills either through operational releases of oil or in the case of oil tanker accidents. Operational discharges from vessels were estimated to account for 21% of oil releases from vessels between 1990 and 1999, and tanker spills about 15% of total annual oil entering the sea 1970-2004 (excluding natural seeps). They occur as a consequence of failure to comply with regulations or arbitrary discharges of waste oil and water containing such oil residues. Such operational discharges are regulated through the MARPOL convention. Operational releases are frequent, but small in the amount of oil spilled per release, and are often not in the focus of attention regarding oil spills. There has been a steady decrease of operational discharges of oil, with an additional decrease of around 50% since the 1990s.

As of 2007, accidental oil tank vessel spills accounted for approximately 8–13% of all oil spilled into the oceans. The main causes of oil tank vessel spills were collision (29%), grounding (22%), mishandling (14%) and sinking (12%), among others. Oil tanker spills are considered a major ecological threat due to the large amount of oil spilled per accident and the fact that major sea traffic routes are close to Large Marine Ecosystems. Around 90% of the world's oil transportation is through oil tankers, and the absolute amount of seaborne oil trade is steadily increasing. However, there has been a reduction of the number of spills from oil tankers and of the amount of oil released per oil tanker spill. In 1992, MARPOL was amended and made it mandatory for large tankers (5,000 dwt and more) to be fitted with double hulls. This is considered to be a major reason for the reduction of oil tanker spills, alongside other innovations such as GPS, sectioning of vessels and sea lanes in narrow straits.

In 2023, the International Tanker Owners Pollution Federation (ITOPF) documented a significant oil spill incident of over 700 tonnes and nine medium spills ranging between 7 and 700 tonnes. The major spill occurred in Asia involving heavy fuel oil, and the medium spills were scattered across Asia, Africa, Europe, and America, involving various oil types.

The total volume of oil released from these spills in 2023 was approximately 2,000 tonnes. This contributes to a trend of decreased oil spill volumes and frequencies over the decades. Comparatively, the 1970s averaged 79 significant spills per year, which drastically reduced to an average of about 6.3 per year in the 2010s, and has maintained a similar level in the current decade.

The reduction in oil spill volume has also been substantial over the years. For instance, the 1990s recorded 1,134,000 tonnes lost, mainly from 10 major spills. This figure decreased to 196,000 tonnes in the 2000s and 164,000 tonnes in the 2010s. In the early 2020s, approximately 28,000 tonnes have been lost, predominantly from major incidents.

=== Offshore oil platforms ===
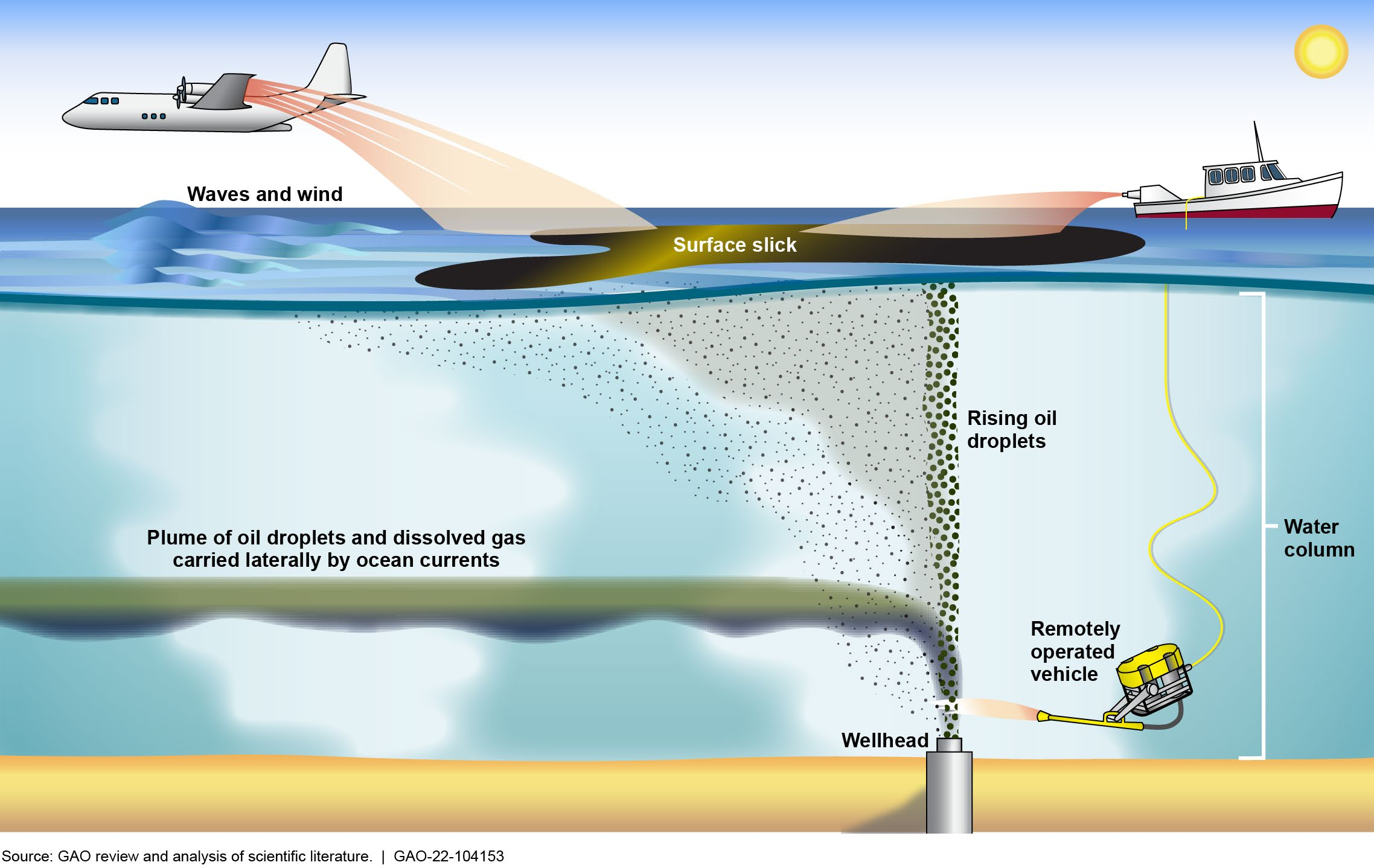
Chemical dispersants may be deployed from boats, planes, and underwater vehicles in response to an offshore oil spill

Accidental spills from oil platforms nowadays account for approximately 3% of oil spills in the oceans. Prominent offshore oil platform spills typically occurred as a result of a blowout. They can go on for months until relief wells have been drilled, resulting in enormous amounts of oil leaked. Notable examples of such oil spills are Deepwater Horizon and Ixtoc I. While technologies for drilling in deep water have significantly improved in the past 30–40 years, oil companies move to drilling sites in more and more difficult places. This ambiguous development results in no clear trend regarding the frequency of offshore oil platform spills.

=== Pipelines ===
As of 2010, overall, there has been a substantial increase of pipeline oil spills in the past four decades. Prominent examples include oil spills of pipelines in the Niger Delta. Pipeline oil spills can be caused by trawling of fishing boats, natural disasters, pipe corrosion, construction defects, sabotage, or an attack, as with the Caño Limón-Coveñas pipeline in Colombia.

Pipelines as sources of oil spills are estimated to contribute 1% of oil pollution to the oceans. Reasons for this are underreporting, and many oil pipeline leaks occur on land with only fractions of that oil reaching the oceans.

=== Other sources ===
Recreational boats can spill oil into the ocean because of operational or human error and unpreparedness. The amounts are however small, and such oil spills are hard to track due to underreporting.

Oil can reach the oceans as oil and fuel from land-based sources. It is estimated that runoff oil and oil from rivers are responsible for 11% of oil pollution to the oceans. Such pollution can also be oil on roads from land vehicles, which is then flushed into the oceans during rainstorms. Purely land-based oil spills are different from maritime oil spills in that oil on land does not spread as quickly as in water, and effects thus remain local.

== Cleanup and recovery ==
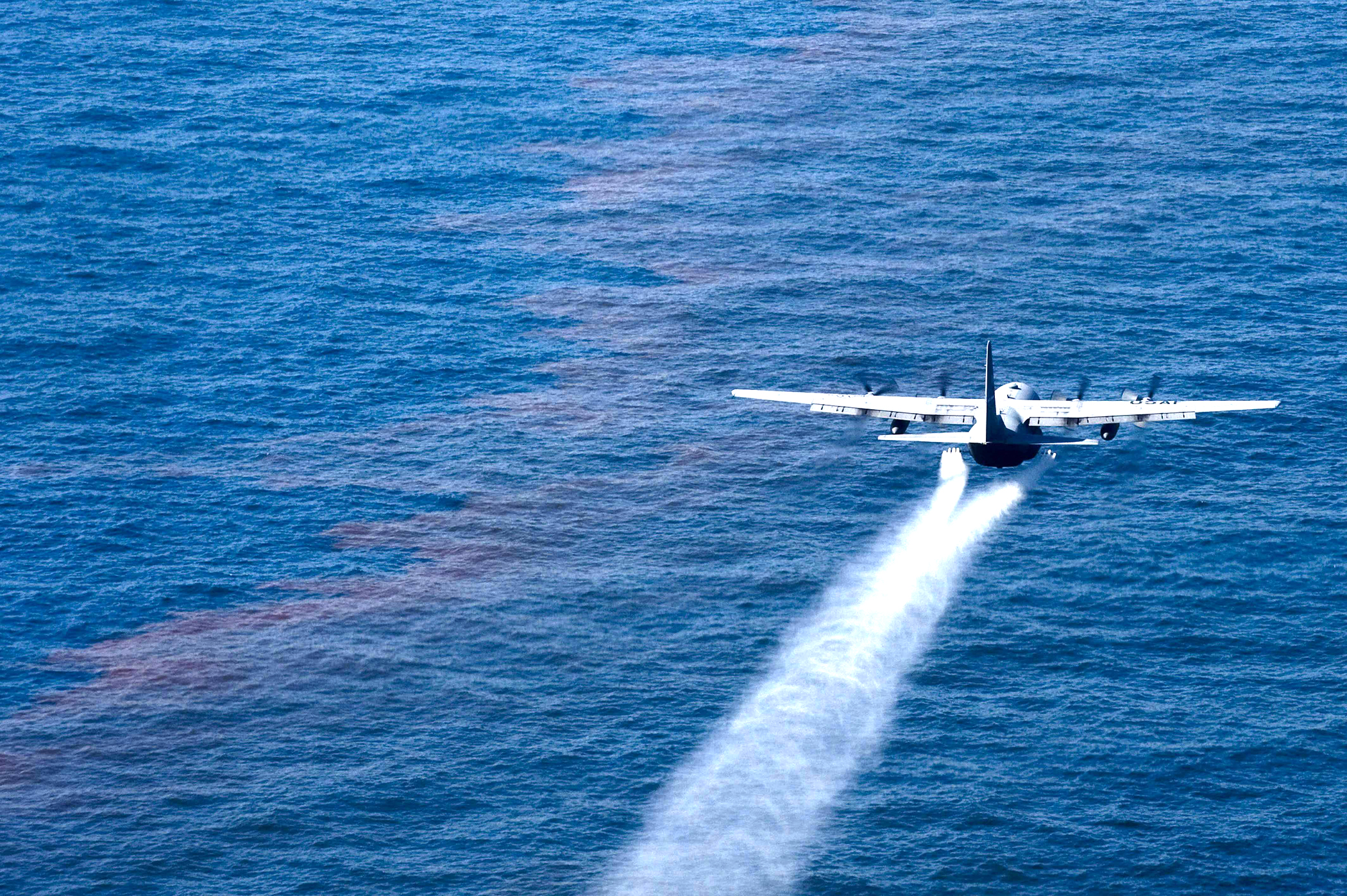
A U.S. Air Force Reserve plane sprays Corexit dispersant over the Deepwater Horizon oil spill in the Gulf of Mexico.

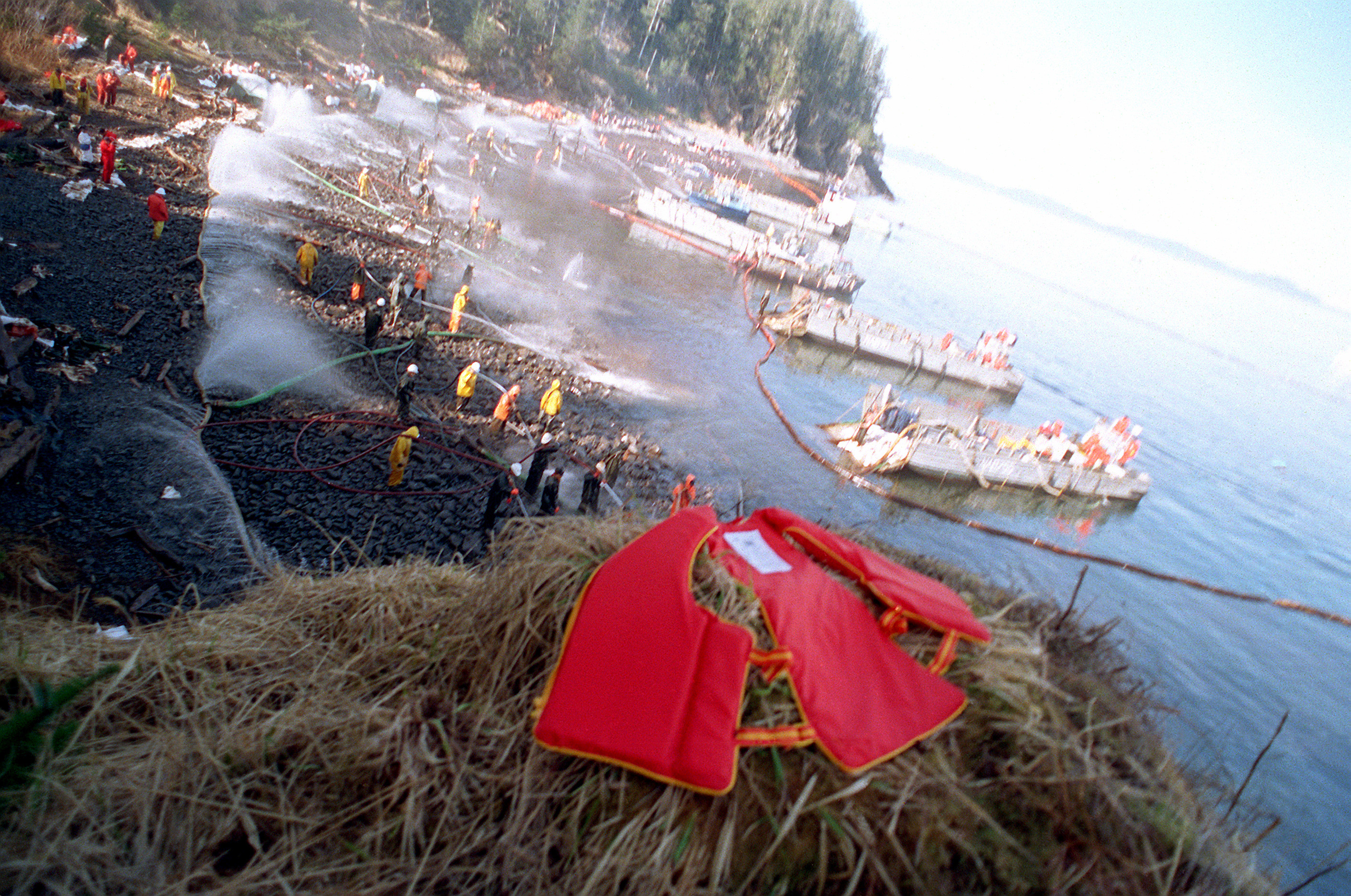
Clean-up efforts after the Exxon Valdez oil spill.

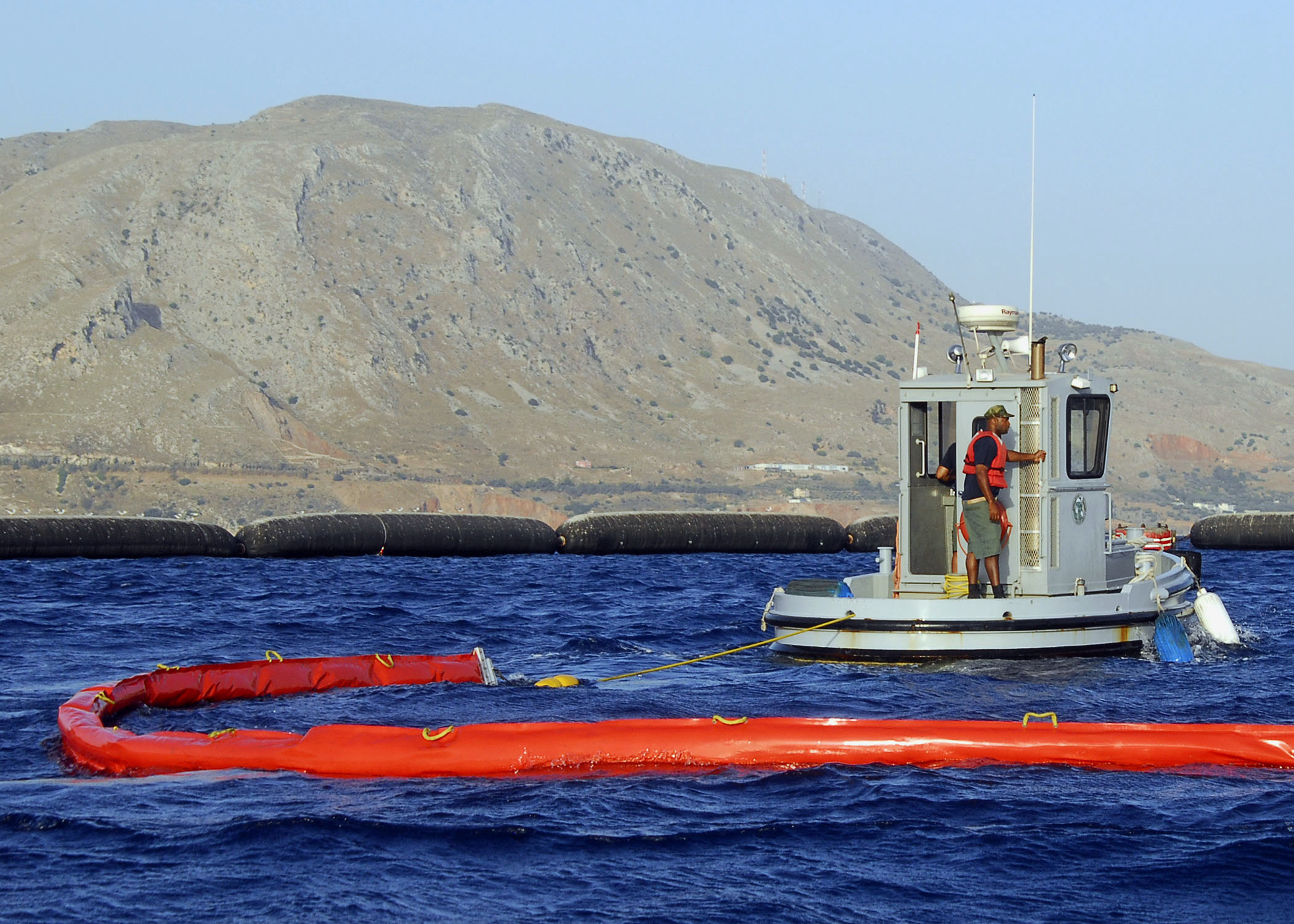
A US Navy oil spill response team drills with a "Harbour Buster high-speed oil containment system".

Cleanup and recovery from an oil spill is difficult and contingent on many factors, including the type of oil spilled, the temperature of the water (affecting evaporation and biodegradation), and the types of shorelines and beaches involved. The accurate determination and prediction of the severity and movement of the spill is critical in determining effective response methods. Physical cleanups of oil spills are also very expensive. Until the 1960s, the best method for remediation consisted of putting straw on the spill and retrieving the oil-soaked straw manually. Chemical remediation is the norm as of the early 21st century, using compounds that can herd and thicken oil for physical recovery, disperse oil in the water, or facilitate burning the oil off. The future of oil cleanup technology is likely the use of microorganisms such as Fusobacteriota (formerly Fusobacteria), species demonstrate potential for future oil spill cleanup because of their ability to colonize and degrade oil slicks on the sea surface.

There are three kinds of oil-consuming bacteria. Sulfate-reducing bacteria (SRB) and acid-producing bacteria are anaerobic, while general aerobic bacteria (GAB) are aerobic. These bacteria occur naturally and will act to remove oil from an ecosystem, and their biomass will tend to replace other populations in the food chain. The chemicals from the oil which dissolve in water, and hence are available to bacteria, are those in the water associated fraction of the oil.

Methods for cleaning up include:

- Bioremediation: use of microorganisms or biological agents to break down or remove oil; such as Alcanivorax bacteria or Methylocella silvestris. Bioremediation has never been demonstrated on scale. In principle, "bioremediation accelerator" could be used: compounds that move hydrocarbons out of water and into gels, when combined with nutrients, encourages natural bioremediation.
- Controlled burning can effectively reduce the amount of oil in water, if done properly. But it can only be done in low wind, and can cause air pollution.

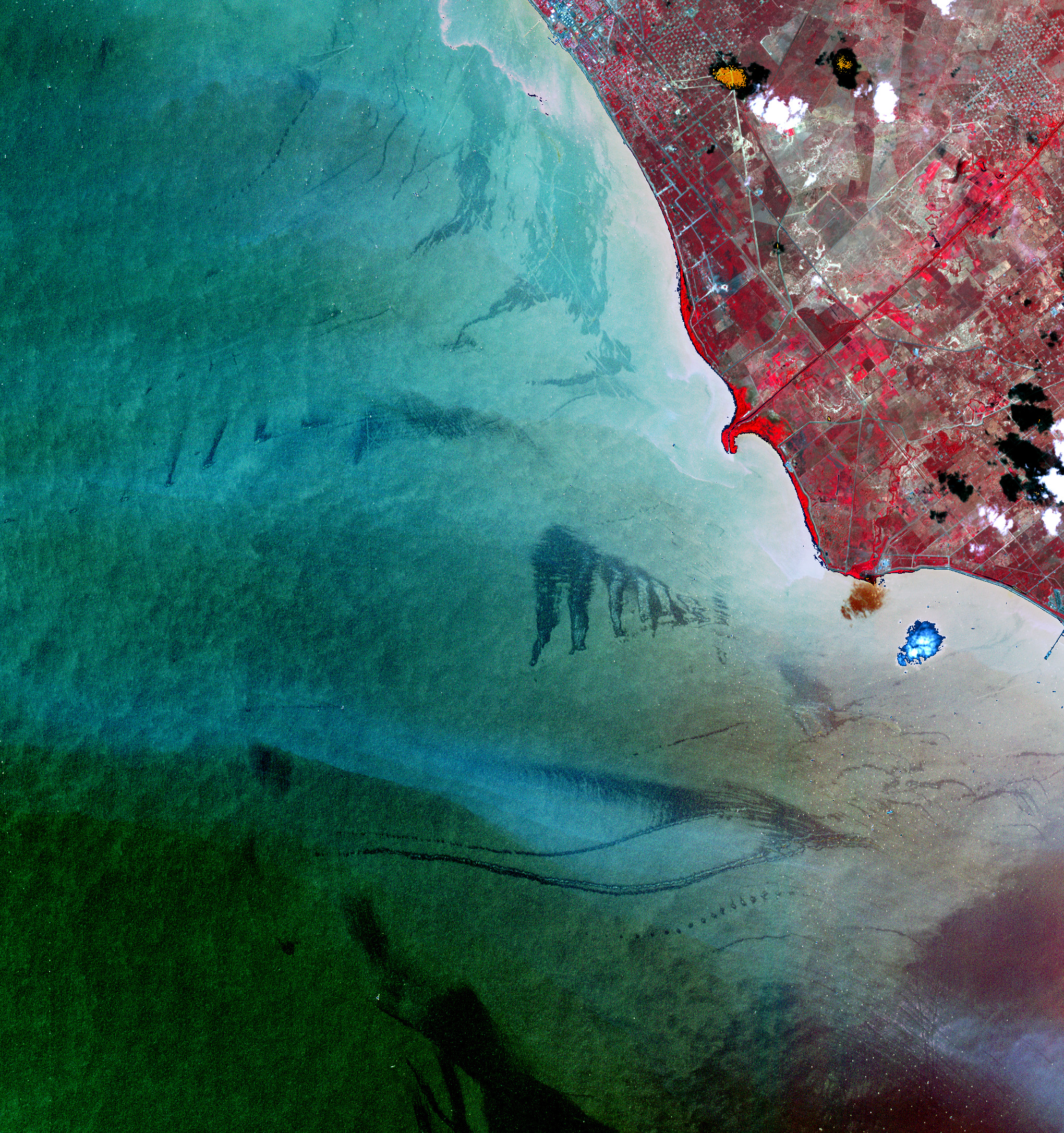
Oil slicks on Lake Maracaibo

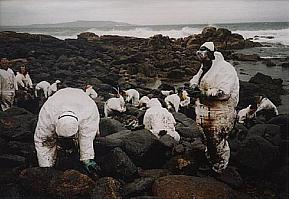
Volunteers cleaning up the aftermath of the Prestige oil spill

- Dispersants can be used to dissipate oil slicks. A dispersant is either a non-surface active polymer or a surface-active substance added to a suspension, usually a colloid, to improve the separation of particles and to prevent settling or clumping. They may rapidly disperse large amounts of certain oil types from the sea surface by transferring it into the water column. They will cause the oil slick to break up and form water-soluble micelles that are rapidly diluted. The oil is then effectively spread throughout a larger volume of water than the surface from where the oil was dispersed. They can also delay the formation of persistent oil-in-water emulsions. However, laboratory experiments showed that dispersants increased toxic hydrocarbon levels in fish by a factor of up to 100 and may kill fish eggs. Dispersed oil droplets infiltrate into deeper water and can lethally contaminate coral. Research indicates that some dispersants are toxic to corals. A 2012 study found that Corexit dispersant had increased the toxicity of oil by up to 52 times. In 2019, the U.S. National Academies released a report analyzing the advantages and disadvantages of several response methods and tools.
- Watch and wait: in some cases, natural attenuation of oil may be most appropriate, due to the invasive nature of facilitated methods of remediation, particularly in ecologically sensitive areas such as wetlands.
- Dredging: for oils dispersed with detergents and other oils denser than water.
- Skimming: Requires calm waters at all times during the process.
- Solidifying: Solidifiers are composed of tiny, floating, dry ice pellets, and hydrophobic polymers that both adsorb and absorb. They clean up oil spills by changing the physical state of spilled oil from liquid to a solid, semi-solid or a rubber-like material that floats on water. Solidifiers are insoluble in water, therefore the removal of the solidified oil is easy and the oil will not leach out. Solidifiers have been proven to be relatively non-toxic to aquatic and wildlife and have been proven to suppress harmful vapors commonly associated with hydrocarbons such as benzene, xylene and naphtha. The reaction time for solidification of oil is controlled by the surface area or size of the polymer or dry pellets as well as the viscosity and thickness of the oil layer. Some solidifier product manufacturers claim the solidified oil can be thawed and used if frozen with dry ice or disposed of in landfills, recycled as an additive in asphalt or rubber products, or burned as a low ash fuel. A solidifier called C.I.Agent (manufactured by C.I.Agent Solutions of Louisville, Kentucky) is being used by BP in granular form, as well as in Marine and Sheen Booms at Dauphin Island and Fort Morgan, Alabama, to aid in the Deepwater Horizon oil spill cleanup.
- Vacuum and centrifuge: oil can be sucked up along with the water, and then a centrifuge can be used to separate the oil from the water – allowing a tanker to be filled with near pure oil. Usually, the water is returned to the sea, making the process more efficient, but allowing small amounts of oil to go back as well. This issue has hampered the use of centrifuges due to a United States regulation limiting the amount of oil in water returned to the sea.
- Beach Raking: coagulated oil that is left on the beach can be picked up by machinery.

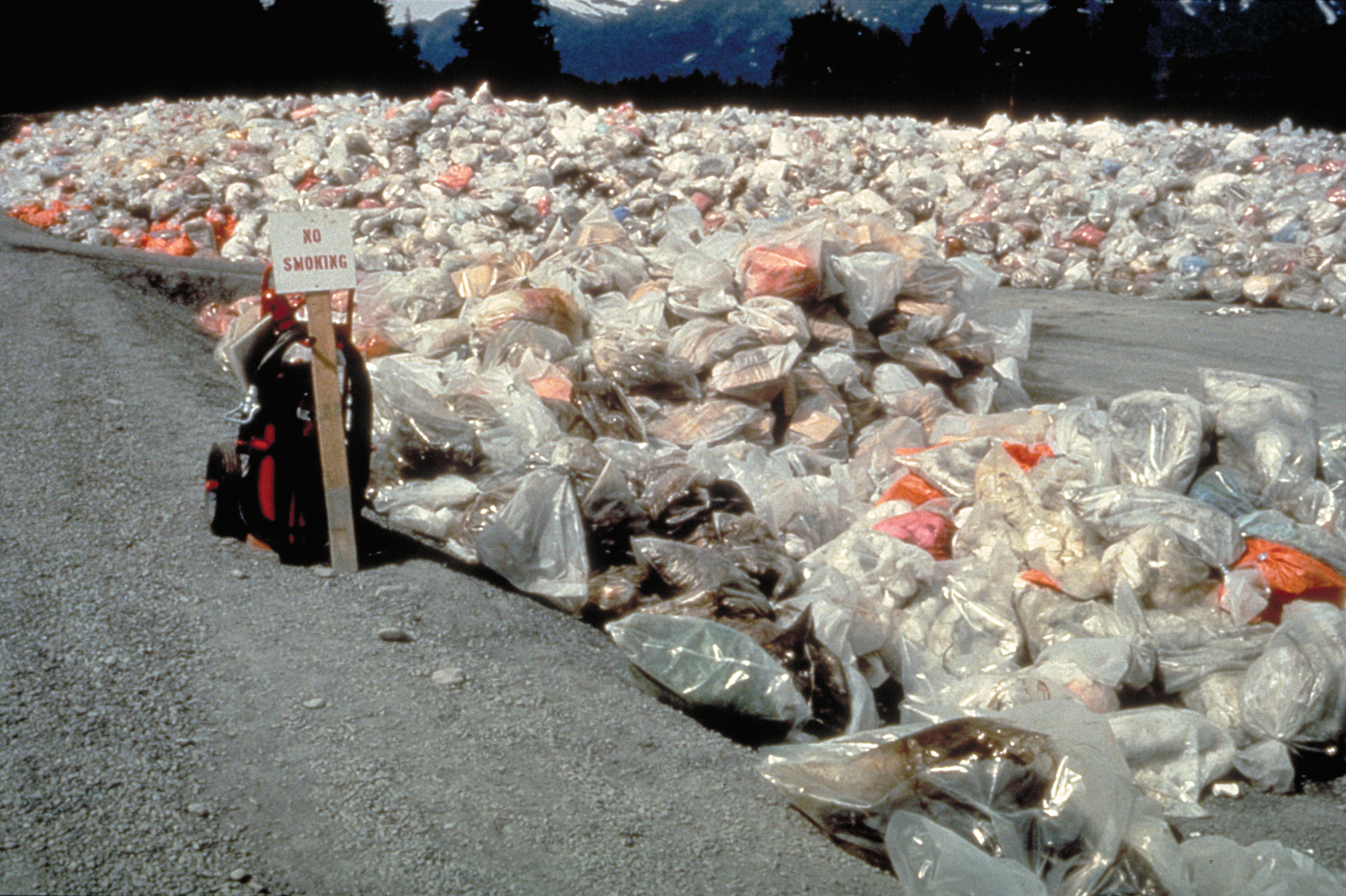
Bags of oily waste from the Exxon Valdez oil spill

Equipment used includes:

- Booms: large floating barriers that round up oil and lift the oil off the water
- Skimmers: skim the oil
- Sorbents: large absorbents that absorb oil and adsorb small droplets
- Chemical and biological agents: helps to break down the oil
- Vacuums: remove oil from beaches and water surface
- Shovels and other road equipment: typically used to clean up oil on beaches

=== Prevention ===
- Secondary containment – methods to prevent releases of oil or hydrocarbons into the environment.
- Oil Spill Prevention Control and Countermeasures (SPCC) program by the United States Environmental Protection Agency.
- Double-hulling – build double hulls into vessels, which reduces the risk and severity of a spill in case of a collision or grounding. Existing single-hull vessels can also be rebuilt to have a double hull.
- Thick-hulled railroad transport tanks.

Spill response procedures should include elements such as;

- A listing of appropriate protective clothing, safety equipment, and cleanup materials required for spill cleanup (gloves, respirators, etc.) and an explanation of their proper use;
- Appropriate evacuation zones and procedures;
- Availability of fire suppression equipment;
- Disposal containers for spill cleanup materials; and
- The first aid procedures that might be required.

=== Research ===
- Adaptation of the oil bee's, e.g. Macropis fulvipes', mechanism for harvesting flower oils has led to the biomimetic development of an additional oil spill recovery method. Oil bees have oleophilic properties in their hair-like protrusions that collect and store oil. This technique has been applied to textiles that can be used to remove oil from sea water.
- Biomarker/fingerprinting. The components of petroleum varies with its source. Consequently, spills can often be traced to their origin by analysis.

== Environmental Sensitivity Index (ESI) mapping ==
Environmental Sensitivity Indexes (ESI) are tools used to create Environmental Sensitivity Maps (ESM). ESM's are pre-planning tools used to identify sensitive areas and resources prior to an oil spill event in order to set priorities for protection and plan clean-up strategies. It is to date the most commonly used mapping tool for sensitive area plotting. The ESI has three components: A shoreline type ranking system, a biological resources section, and a human-use resource category.

=== History and development ===
ESI is the most frequently used sensitivity mapping tool yet. It was first applied in 1979 in response to an oil-spill near Texas in the Gulf of Mexico. To this time, ESI maps were prepared merely days in advance of one's arrival to an oil spill location. ESMs used to be atlases, maps consisting of thousands of pages that could solely work with spills in the oceans. In the past 3 decades, this product has been transformed into a versatile online tool. This conversion allows sensitivity indexing to become more adaptable and in 1995 by the US National Oceanic and Atmospheric Administration (NOAA) worked on the tool allowing ESI to extended maps to lakes, rivers, and estuary shoreline types. ESI maps have since become integral to collecting, synthesizing, and producing data which have previously never been accessible in digital formats. Especially in the United States, the tool has made impressive advancements in developing tidal bay protection strategies, collecting seasonal information and generally in the modelling of sensitive areas. Together with Geographic Information System Mapping (GIS), ESI integrates their techniques to successfully geographically reference the three different types of resources.

=== Usage and application ===
The ESI depicts environmental stability, coastal resilience to maritime related catastrophes, and the configurations of a stress-response relationship between all things maritime. Created for ecological-related decision making, ESMs can accurately identify sensitive areas and habitats, clean-up responses, response measures and monitoring strategies for oil-spills. The maps allow experts from varying fields to come together and work efficiently during fast-paced response operations. The process of making an ESI atlas involves GIS technology. The steps involve, first zoning the area that is to be mapped, and secondly, a meeting with local and regional experts on the area and its resources. Following, all the shoreline types, biological, and human use resources need to be identified and their locations pinpointed. Once all this information is gathered, it then becomes digitized. In its digital format, classifications are set in place, tables are produced and local experts refine the product before it gets released.

ESI's current most common use is within contingency planning. After the maps are calculated and produced, the most sensitive areas get picked out and authenticated. These areas then go through a scrutinization process throughout which methods of protection and resource assessments are obtained. This in-depth research is then put back into the ESMs to develop their accuracy and allowing for tactical information to be stored in them as well. The finished maps are then used for drills and trainings for clean-up efficiency. Trainings also often help to update the maps and tweak certain flaws that might have occurred in the previous steps.

=== ESI Categories ===
==== Shoreline type ====
Shoreline type is classified by rank depending on how easy the target site would be to clean up, how long the oil would persist, and how sensitive the shoreline is. The ranking system works on a 10-point scale where the higher the rank, the more sensitive a habitat or shore is. The coding system usually works in colour, where warm colours are used for the increasingly sensitive types and cooler colours are used for robust shores. For each navigable body of water, there is a feature classifying its sensitivity to oil. Shoreline type mapping codes a large range of ecological settings including estuarine, lacustrine, and riverine environments. Floating oil slicks put the shoreline at particular risk when they eventually come ashore, covering the substrate with oil. The differing substrates between shoreline types vary in their response to oiling, and influence the type of cleanup that will be required to effectively decontaminate the shoreline. Hence ESI shoreline ranking helps committees identify which clean-up techniques are approved or detrimental the natural environment. The exposure the shoreline has to wave energy and tides, substrate type, and slope of the shoreline are also taken into account—in addition to biological productivity and sensitivity. Mangroves and marshes tend to have higher ESI rankings due to the potentially long-lasting and damaging effects of both oil contamination and cleanup actions. Impermeable and exposed surfaces with high wave action are ranked lower due to the reflecting waves keeping oil from coming onshore, and the speed at which natural processes will remove the oil.

==== Biological resources ====
Within the biological resources, the ESI maps protected areas as well as those with bio-diverse importance. These are usually identified through the UNEP-WCMC Integrated Biodiversity Assessment Tool. There are varying types of coastal habitats and ecosystems and thus also many endangered species that need to be considered when looking at affected areas post oil spills. The habitats of plants and animals that may be at risk from oil spills are referred to as "elements" and are divided by functional group. Further classification divides each element into species groups with similar life histories and behaviors relative to their vulnerability to oil spills. There are eight element groups: birds, reptiles, amphibians, fish, invertebrates, habitats and plants, wetlands, and marine mammals and terrestrial mammals. Element groups are further divided into sub-groups, for example, the 'marine mammals' element group is divided into dolphins, manatees, pinnipeds (seals, sea lions & walruses), polar bears, sea otters and whales. Necessary when ranking and selecting species is their vulnerability to the oil spills themselves. This not only includes their reactions to such events but also their fragility, the scale of large clusters of animals, whether special life stages occur ashore, and whether any present species is threatened, endangered or rare. The way in which the biological resources are mapped is through symbols representing the species, and polygons and lines to map out the special extent of the species. The symbols also have the ability to identify the most vulnerable of a species life stages, such as the molting, nesting, hatching or migration patterns. This allows for more accurate response plans during those given periods. There is also a division for sub-tidal habitats which are equally important to coastal biodiversity including kelp, coral reefs and sea beds which are not commonly mapped within the shoreline ESI type.

==== Human-use resources ====
Human-use resources are also often referred to as socio-economic features, which map inanimate resources that have the potential to be directly impacted by oil pollution. Human-use resources that are mapped within the ESI will have socio-economic repercussions to an oil spill. These resources are divided into four major classifications: archaeological importance or cultural resource site, high-use recreational areas or shoreline access points, important protected management areas, and resource origins. Some examples include airports, diving sites, popular beach sites, marinas, hotels, factories, natural reserves or marine sanctuaries. When mapped, the human-use resources the need protecting must be certified by a local or regional policy maker. These resources are often extremely vulnerable to seasonal changes due to ex. fishing and tourism. For this category there are also a set of symbols available to demonstrate their importance on ESMs.

== Estimating the volume of a spill ==
By observing the thickness of the film of oil and its appearance on the surface of the water, it is possible to estimate the quantity of oil spilled. If the surface area of the spill is also known, the total volume of the oil can be calculated.

Appearance	Film thickness			Quantity spread	
Appearance	inches	mm	nm	gal/sq mi	l/ha
Barely visible	0.0000015	0.000038	38	25	0.37
Silvery sheen	0.000003	0.000076	76	50	0.73
First trace of color	0.000006	0.00015	150	100	1.5
Bright bands of color	0.000012	0.0003	300	200	2.9
Colors begin to dull	0.00004	0.001	1000	666	9.7
Colors are much darker	0.00008	0.002	2000	1332	19.5

Oil spill model systems are used by industry and government to assist in planning and emergency decision making. Of critical importance for the skill of the oil spill model prediction is the adequate description of the wind and current fields. There is a worldwide oil spill modelling (WOSM) program. Tracking the scope of an oil spill may also involve verifying that hydrocarbons collected during an ongoing spill are derived from the active spill or some other source. This can involve sophisticated analytical chemistry focused on finger printing an oil source based on the complex mixture of substances present. Largely, these will be various hydrocarbons, among the most useful being polyaromatic hydrocarbons. In addition, both oxygen and nitrogen heterocyclic hydrocarbons, such as parent and alkyl homologues of carbazole, quinoline, and pyridine, are present in many crude oils. As a result, these compounds have great potential to supplement the existing suite of hydrocarbons targets to fine-tune source tracking of petroleum spills. Such analysis can also be used to follow weathering and degradation of crude spills.

== Largest oil spills ==
Crude oil and refined fuel spills from tanker ship accidents have damaged vulnerable ecosystems in Alaska, the Gulf of Mexico, the Galapagos Islands, France, the Sundarbans and many other places. The quantity of oil spilled during accidents has ranged from a few hundred tons to several hundred thousand tons (e.g., Deepwater Horizon oil spill, Atlantic Empress, Amoco Cadiz), but volume is a limited measure of damage or impact. Smaller spills have already proven to have a great impact on ecosystems, such as the Exxon Valdez oil spill because of the remoteness of the site or the difficulty of an emergency environmental response.

Oil spills in the Niger Delta are among the worst on the planet and is often used as an example of ecocide. Between 1970 and 2000, there were over 7,000 spills. Between 1956 and 2006, up to 1.5 million tons of oil were spilled in the Niger Delta.

Oil spills at sea are generally much more damaging than those on land, since they can spread for hundreds of nautical miles in a thin oil slick which can cover beaches with a thin coating of oil. These can kill seabirds, mammals, shellfish and other organisms they coat. Oil spills on land are more readily containable if a makeshift earth dam can be rapidly bulldozed around the spill site before most of the oil escapes, and land animals can avoid the oil more easily.

Largest oil spills
Spill / Tanker	Location	Date	Tonnes of crude oil (thousands) (Note: One metric ton (tonne) of crude oil is roughly equal to 308 US gallons or 7.33 barrels approx.; 1 oil barrel (bbl) is equal to 35 imperial or 42 US gallons. Approximate conversion factors.)	Barrels (thousands)	US Gallons (thousands)	References
Kuwaiti Oil Fires (Note: Estimates for the amount of oil burned in the Kuwaiti Oil Fires range from 500,000,000 barrels (79,000,000 m^{3}) to nearly 2,000,000,000 barrels (320,000,000 m^{3}). Between 605 and 732 wells were set ablaze, while many others were severely damaged and gushed uncontrolled for several months. It took over ten months to bring all of the wells under control. The fires alone were estimated to consume approximately 6,000,000 barrels (950,000 m^{3}) of oil per day at their peak.)	Kuwait	January 16, 1991 – November 6, 1991	136,000	1,000,000	42,000,000	
Kuwaiti Oil Lakes (Note: Oil spilled from sabotaged fields in Kuwait during the 1991 Persian Gulf War pooled in approximately 300 oil lakes, estimated by the Kuwaiti Oil Minister to contain approximately 25,000,000 to 50,000,000 barrels (7,900,000 m^{3}) of oil. According to the U.S. Geological Survey, this figure does not include the amount of oil absorbed by the ground, forming a layer of "tarcrete" over approximately five percent of the surface of Kuwait, fifty times the area occupied by the oil lakes.)	Kuwait	January 1991 – November 1991	3,409–6,818	25,000–50,000	1,050,000–2,100,000	
Lakeview Gusher	Kern County, California, USA	March 14, 1910 – September 1911	1,200	9,000	378,000	
Gulf War oil spill (Note: Estimates for the Gulf War oil spill range from 4,000,000 to 11,000,000 barrels (1,700,000 m^{3}). The figure of 6,000,000 to 8,000,000 barrels (1,300,000 m^{3}) is the range adopted by the U.S. Environmental Protection Agency and the United Nations in the immediate aftermath of the war, 1991–1993, and is still current, as cited by NOAA and The New York Times in 2010. This amount only includes oil discharged directly into the Persian Gulf by the retreating Iraqi forces from January 19 to 28, 1991. However, according to the U.N. report, oil from other sources not included in the official estimates continued to pour into the Persian Gulf through June, 1991. The amount of this oil was estimated to be at least several hundred thousand barrels, and may have factored into the estimates above 8,000,000 barrels (1,300,000 m^{3}).)	Kuwait, Iraq, and the Persian Gulf	January 19, 1991 – January 28, 1991	818–1,091	6,000–8,000	252,000–336,000	
Deepwater Horizon	United States, Gulf of Mexico	April 20, 2010 – July 15, 2010	560–585	4,100–4,900	189,000–231,000	
Ixtoc I	Mexico, Gulf of Mexico	June 3, 1979 – March 23, 1980	454–480	3,329–3,520	139,818–147,840	
Atlantic Empress / Aegean Captain	Trinidad and Tobago	July 19, 1979	287	2,105	88,396	
Fergana Valley	Uzbekistan	March 2, 1992	285	2,090	87,780	
Nowruz Field Platform	Iran, Persian Gulf	February 4, 1983	260	1,900	80,000	
ABT Summer	Angola, 700 nmi (1,300 km; 810 mi) offshore	May 28, 1991	260	1,907	80,080	
Castillo de Bellver	South Africa, Saldanha Bay	August 6, 1983	252	1,848	77,616	
Amoco Cadiz	France, Brittany	March 16, 1978	223	1,635	68,684	
Taylor Energy	United States, Gulf of Mexico	September 23, 2004 – Present	210–490	1,500–3,500	63,000–147,000	
Odyssey	off the coast of Nova Scotia, Canada	November 10, 1988	132	968	40,704	
Torrey Canyon	England, Cornwall	March 18, 1967	119	872	36,635	

== The economic impact of oil spills ==
Oil spills can have devastating environmental impacts; however, they often have equally detrimental economic consequences. These disasters do not only pose immediate threats to marine ecosystems, but also leave lasting impacts on local and regional economies. This section will explore the multifaceted economic repercussions of oil spills, specifically considering: the decline in tourism, the reduction in fishing, and the impact on port activity.

=== Decline in tourism ===
In the short term, an oil spill will prevent tourists from partaking in usual recreational activities such as swimming, boating, diving, and angling. As such, the area will witness a decline in tourism. This will negatively impact several industries. Firstly, the hotels, restaurants, and bars in the immediate vicinity will have significantly fewer customers. Local car park owners and shopkeepers will be affected too. Then, this decline in tourists will cause further damage to travel agencies, tour guides, and transport companies. The beaches will likely stay shut for several days whilst clean-up operations take place, and there may be disruption caused by an increase in clean-up vehicles. Overall, several businesses will be negatively impacted by the spill in the short term, which can lead to further long-term damage should companies be forced to reduce staff or shut down entirely.

Similarly, tourism in Ibiza was severely impacted in 2007. Just 20 tonnes of oil were spilled from the Don Pedro in July 2007, a relatively limited volume compared with other spills. Whilst this caused just a small amount of environmental damage, the economic damage was disproportionately large. Most beaches were reopened within a week, just a dozen seabirds were affected, and there were no reports of injured sea mammals. Nonetheless, 27 percent of hotels in Ibiza were negatively affected, with two thirds of these being seafront hotels. Thus, 32 claims were made by tourist firms, equating to approximately 1.5 million euros of compensation. This provides a clear example of an oil spill resulting in massive economic disaster. Furthermore, following the world's largest oil spill, the Deepwater Horizon Oil Spill in 2010, the U.S. Travel Association estimated 23 billion dollars' worth of associated costs for affected tourist infrastructure.

=== Reduction in fishing ===
After the Deepwater Horizon crisis, the Gulf of Mexico suffered an estimated 1.9-billion-dollar loss in revenue from fishing. This is because fishing closures were imposed due to fears of the safety of seafood, there was also a decline in demand, as seafood restaurants and markets suffered such severe losses that many were forced to shut. Usually, the Gulf sees an average of 106,703 fishing trips per day, equating to 1 million metric tonnes of annual fishery landings. Therefore, the necessary fishing ban following the disaster was highly damaging. Similarly, following the sinking of the Prestige oil tanker near Galicia, Spain, in November 2002, 77,000 tonnes of crude oil were spilled into the ocean. This disaster has had severe economic consequences, alongside the environmental damage. Large zones were cordoned in which fishing was banned, with these bans lasting for more than eight months. This affected several groups, including fishermen, ship owners, and the companies who bought and sold the fish. Several compensatory actions were introduced, including tax benefits and aid. This resulted in expenses of approximately 113 million euros in an attempt to compensate for the halt in fishing activity. The examples of the Deepwater Horizon and the Prestige clearly illustrate the severe economic consequences when oil spills prevent commercial fishing.

Water pollution due to oil spills can be severe, often resulting in the death or injury of many sea creatures, including birds, sea mammals, fish, algae, and coral. The impact on fish caught in the spill has both immediate and longer-term impacts. Immediately, the fish are tainted with oil, and they cannot be used commercially due to safety reasons. Then, the oil can spread and sink below the water's surface. If fish swallow the oil, they are also inconsumable due to the health risk posed to humans. Therefore, massive economic damage is caused to the fishing industry following an oil spill, as the stock is vastly reduced. Furthermore, the oil can cause damage to the equipment and boats of fishermen. Clean-up operations can also interrupt usual fishing routes, and sometimes fishing bans are imposed. This further illustrates the damaging economic effects of oil spills on commercial fishing, which is particularly detrimental for regions whose economy relies heavily on fishing.

=== The impact on port activity ===
Ports are major hubs for economic activity; thus, an oil spill in or near a port can have significant consequences. During and following a spill, all boats entering or leaving the port must be closely managed in order to prevent further spread. Furthermore, specialist cleaning contractors must be hired to effectively clean the various port structures. Oil spills are relatively regular occurrences in ports, as small spills often happen due to the large volume of boats, and these are not as well documented in the media as larger events are. However, these spills must still be dealt with, and they can still have damaging economic repercussions. Both the incident and the response require expensive and time-consuming management which is disruptive to port activity. Furthermore, special care must be taken during clean-up operations to ensure that the oil does not get stuck under the quayside, as this could act as a continual source of oil contamination. This can also be seen with sea defenses; should the oil penetrate deep into the structures, they may become a source of secondary pollution. Therefore, it is crucial for ports to manage and mitigate any oil spills, in order to limit the damage to ships and shipping operations. Otherwise, should large disruption occur, the economic damage can be extensive due to costly clean-up processes and delayed shipments.

== See also ==
- Automated Data Inquiry for Oil Spills
- Environmental issues with petroleum
- Environmental issues with shipping
- LNG spill
- Storm oil
- Low-temperature thermal desorption
- National Oil and Hazardous Substances Pollution Contingency Plan
- Ohmsett (Oil and Hazardous Materials Simulated Environmental Test Tank)
- Oil Pollution Act of 1990 (in the US)
- Oil well
- Penguin sweater
- Project Deep Spill, the first intentional deepwater oil and gas spill
- Pseudomonas putida (used for degrading oil)
- S-200 (fertilizer)
- ShoreZone
- Spill containment
- Tarball
