= BSEE =

BSEE may stand for:

- Bachelor of Science in Electrical Engineering, an undergraduate degree
- Bureau of Safety and Environmental Enforcement, an agency of the U.S. Department of Interior
