= Kevin M. Sligh Sr. =

American government official

Kevin Maurice Sligh, Sr.
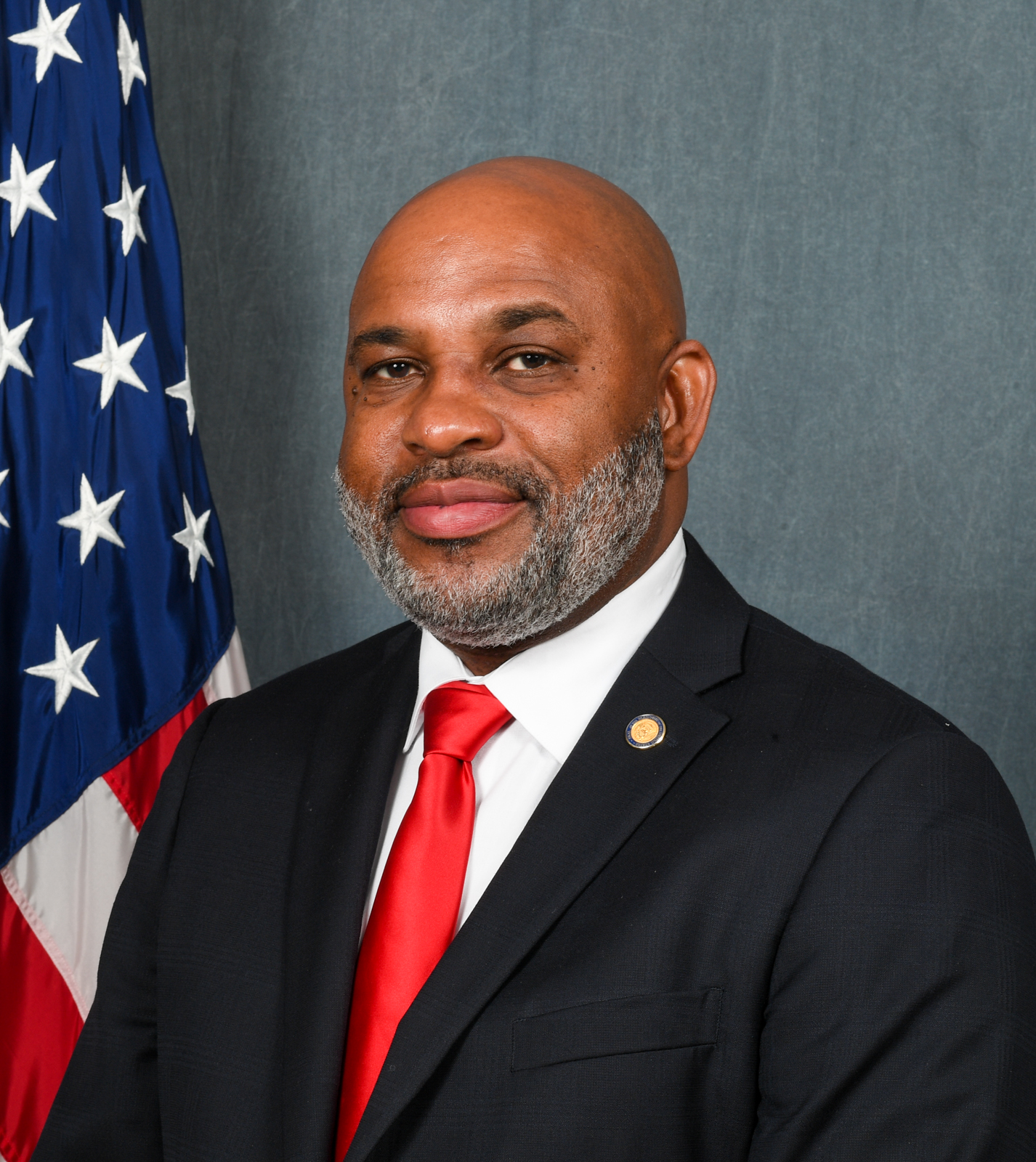

6th Director of the Bureau of Safety and Environmental Enforcement
- In office March 28, 2022 – September 2024
- Preceded by: Scott A. Angelle

Personal details
- Born: Philadelphia, Pennsylvania, U.S.
- Education: University of Phoenix (AA); Excelsior College (BS); Northcentral University (MBA)
- Occupation: Government official
- Known for: First African American director of BSEE

Military service
- Branch/service: United States Coast Guard
- Years of service: 24

Kevin Maurice Sligh, Sr. was the director of the Bureau of Safety and Environmental Enforcement from March 2022 to September 2024. Sligh is the first African American to lead BSEE. He was previously the deputy regional administrator of the Federal Emergency Management Agency. (FEMA) Region 5 located in Chicago, Illinois from 2020 to 2021.

== Education ==
Sligh graduated from Lankenau-Germantown high school in Philadelphia, PA. He earned an Associate of Arts in Management from the University of Phoenix, a Bachelor of Science in Management from Excelsior College, and a Masters of Business Administration (MBA) with a concentration in homeland security from Northcentral University.

== Career ==
Sligh was the Director of the Bureau of Safety and Environmental Enforcement. He joined BSEE on March 28, 2022, and is responsible for promoting safety, protecting the environment, and conserving resources through the regulatory oversight and enforcement of energy operations on the U.S. Outer Continental Shelf. The Director is supported by senior executives who manage national programs, policies, operations and budgets for regulated oil & gas and offshore wind industries.

Most recently, Sligh served as Deputy Regional Administrator for the Federal Emergency Management Agency, Region 5. In this position, he provided oversight for operational aspects of preparedness, response, recovery, and mitigation activities in support of the region’s six Great Lakes states, as well as 34 federally recognized tribal nations. Prior to that, Sligh was Deputy Director of the Office of Marine Environmental Response Policy at U.S. Coast Guard Headquarters. There, he served as principal advisor to the Director and oversaw human resources, budget, and acquisitions; national spill response planning and policy; and industry, interagency, and international coordination. Sligh served a seven-month detail at the White House in 2017 as the Director for Response Policy within the National Security Council Resilience Directorate focusing on the Executive Office of the President response during Hurricanes Harvey, Irma, and Maria.

Additional assignments include Chief, Incident Management & Crisis Response Division at U.S. Coast Guard Headquarters, and he also provided support to the Coast Guard’s Office of Marine Environmental Response as the nation’s Area Contingency Plan program manager and worked for Booz Allen Hamilton in support of USCG Headquarters from 2012- 2014. Sligh concluded a 24-year active duty and reserve military career, where he gained extensive incident management and oil spill response experience, including serving as Deputy Incident Commander for the Deepwater Horizon oil spill in 2011, as well as holding key leadership roles in response to Hurricanes Katrina, Ike and Gustav, and several other various deployments.
