= Title 30 of the Code of Federal Regulations =

U.S. federal rules and regulations on national mineral resources

CFR Title 30 - Mineral Resources is one of fifty titles comprising the United States Code of Federal Regulations (CFR), containing the principal set of rules and regulations issued by federal agencies regarding national mineral resources. It is available in digital and printed form, and can be referenced online using the Electronic Code of Federal Regulations (e-CFR).

30 CFR Part 11 regulations for respirators have been moved to Title 42, Part 84.

== Structure ==
The table of contents, as reflected in the e-CFR updated February 28, 2014, is as follows:

Volume	Chapter	Parts	Regulatory Entity
1	I	1-199	Mine Safety and Health Administration, Department of Labor
2	II	200-299	Bureau of Safety and Environmental Enforcement, Department of the Interior
	IV	400-499	Geological Survey, Department of the Interior
	V	500-599	Bureau of Ocean Energy Management, Department of the Interior
3	VII	700-999	Office of Surface Mining Reclamation and Enforcement, Department of the Interior
	XII	1200-1299	Office of Natural Resources Revenue, Department of the Interior

== See also ==
- NIOSH air filtration rating - 30 CFR 11 (now removed)
