= Title 42 of the Code of Federal Regulations =

U.S. federal rules and regulations on public health

CFR Title 42 - Public Health is one of fifty titles comprising the United States Code of Federal Regulations (CFR). Title 42 is the principal set of rules and regulations issued by federal agencies of the United States regarding public health, including respirator rules and regulations moved from CFR Title 30 (including MSHA), to the Public Health Service (including NIOSH and the CDC).

== Structure ==
The table of contents, as reflected in the e-CFR updated February 19, 2014, is as follows:

Volume	Chapter	Parts	Regulatory Entity
1	I	1-199	Public Health Service, Department of Health and Human Services
	II-III	200-399	[Reserved]
2	IV	400-413	Centers for Medicare and Medicaid Services, Department of Health and Human Services
3		414-429	Centers for Medicare and Medicaid Services, Department of Health and Human Services
4		430-481	Centers for Medicare and Medicaid Services, Department of Health and Human Services
5		482-699	Centers for Medicare and Medicaid Services, Department of Health and Human Services
	V	1000-1099	Office of Inspector General-HHS, Department of Health and Human Services
