= S-200 (bioremediation) =

Compound aiding in breakdown of spilled oil

S-200 is a bioremediation product used to clean up oil spills. It is an oleophilic nitrogen-phosphorus nutrient that promotes the growth of micro-organisms that degrade hydrocarbons (such as oil and fuel). S-200 bonds to the hydrocarbon to eliminate the need to reapply in tidal or rain events. S-200 is identified as a bioremediation accelerator and as such, does not contain bacterial cultures, but rather contributes to the establishment of a robust microbial population. In the laboratory, considerable biodegradation to alkanes was seen over the course of treatment. Field trials have yielded inconsistent results.

The product was developed by International Environmental Products, a US company based around S-200 as its product.

== Field tests ==
After laboratory and field trials, S-200 was the only bioremediation process selected by the Spanish Department of National Parks for the final cleanup of the Galician coastline following the Prestige oil tanker spill.

The effects of the product were studied on a beach affected by the spill] off the coast of Spain in 2002. A study concluded that it enhanced the biodegradation rate of specific compounds, but did not establish whether it had improved the visible aspect of the beach, detached stuck oil, or reduced weathered oil. Other compounds, such as uric acid and lecithin, may be more effective than S-200, but wash off in tidal areas or rain events and must be applied continuously. In 2006, other researchers summarized the findings of experiments on Prestige-affected coastal areas, concluding that oloephilic substances such as S-200 were of "limited effectiveness.

In 2006, a field bioremediation assay was conducted by the Department of Microbiology, University of Barcelona on the use of S-200 ten months after the Prestige heavy fuel-oil spill on a beach of the Cantabrian coast in northern Spain. The field survey indicated that the product enhanced the biodegradation rate, particularly of high molecular weight n-alkanes, alkylcyclohexanes, and benzenes, and alkylated PAHs. The most significant molecular bioremediation indicators were the depletion of diasteranes and C-27 sterane components.

However, the study was confined to analysis of specific compounds, and did not report whether the application of S-200 caused a decrease in the amount of weathered oil, the detachment of any oil that had been stuck, or any improvement to the visible appearance of the beach.

In 2006, other researchers summarized the findings of experiments on Prestige-affected coastal areas, concluding that oloephilic fertilizers such as S-200 were of "limited effectiveness".

A 2007 test by researchers at the Technical University of Crete comparing a control to treatment by S-200 and treatment by uric acid and lecithin found that the hydrocarbon degradation in a period of 7 days was greater with the uric acid and lecithin treatment than it was with the S-200 treatment and the control.
