= National Oil and Hazardous Substances Pollution Contingency Plan =

The National Oil and Hazardous Substances Pollution Contingency Plan or National Contingency Plan (NCP) is the United States federal government's blueprint for responding to oil spills and hazardous substance releases. It documents national response capability and is intended to promote overall coordination among the hierarchy of responders and contingency plans.

The first National Contingency Plan was developed and published in 1968, in response to a massive oil spill from the oil tanker Torrey Canyon, off the coast of England a year earlier. More than 37 million gallons of crude oil spilled into the water and caused massive environmental damage. To avoid the problems faced by response officials involved in the incident, US officials developed a coordinated approach to cope with potential spills in US waters. The 1968 plan provided the first comprehensive system of accident reporting, spill containment, and cleanup. It also established a response headquarters, a national reaction team, and regional reaction teams (precursors to the current National Response Team and Regional Response Teams).

Congress has broadened the scope of the National Contingency Plan over the years. As required by the Clean Water Act of 1972, the NCP was revised the following year to include a framework for responding to hazardous substance spills and oil discharges. Following the passage of Superfund legislation in 1980, the NCP was broadened to cover releases at hazardous waste sites requiring emergency removal actions. Over the years, additional revisions have been made to the NCP to keep pace with the enactment of legislation. The latest revisions to the NCP were finalized in 1994 to reflect the oil spill provisions of the Oil Pollution Act of 1990.

Under the National Contingency Plan, federal agencies should plan for emergencies and develop procedures for addressing oil discharges and releases of hazardous substances, pollutants, or contaminants; coordinate their planning, preparedness, and response activities with one another coordinate their planning, preparedness, and response activities with affected states, local governments, and private entities; and make available those facilities or resources that may be useful in a response situation, consistent with agency authorities and capabilities.

Once a response has been triggered, the USCG or USEPA "is authorized to initiate and, in the case of a discharge posing a substantial threat to public health or welfare of the United States is required to initiate and direct, appropriate response activities when the Administrator or Secretary determines that any oil or CWA hazardous substance is discharged or there is a substantial threat of such discharge from any vessel or offshore or onshore facility into or on the navigable waters of the United States, on the adjoining shorelines to the navigable waters, into or on the waters of the exclusive economic zone, or that may affect natural resources belonging to, appertaining to, or under exclusive management authority of the United States."

The federal On-Scene Coordinator (OSC) "directs response efforts and coordinates all other efforts at the scene of a discharge or release."

== Major revisions ==
- 1968 Initial plan
- 1973 Added provisions for hazardous substances
- 1980 (circa) revised to reflect CERCLA provisions
- 1990 Revised and reorganized to reflect SARA provisions
- 1994 Revised to reflect OPA revisions

== Role in BP oil spill ==
The plan places responsibility for command and control in managing serious disaster response with the US federal government and not a private company like BP, according to a 2010 article in Rolling Stone (magazine) about the BP Gulf oil spill.

== Key provisions ==
Section 300.110 establishes the National Response Team and its roles and responsibilities in the National Response system, including planning and coordinating responses to major discharges of oil or hazardous waste, providing guidance to Regional Response Teams, co-ordinating a national program of preparedness planning and response, and facilitating research to improve response activities. The EPA serves as the lead agency within the National Response Team (NRT).

Section 300.115 establishes the Regional Response Teams and their roles and responsibilities in the National Response System, including, coordinating preparedness, planning, and response at the regional level. The RRT consists of a standing team made up of representatives of each federal agency that is a member of the Net, state and local government representatives, and also an incident-specific team, made up of members of the standing team that is activated for a response. The RRT also provides oversight and consistency review for area plans within a given region.

Section 300.120 establishes general responsibilities of federal On-Scene Coordinators.

Section 300.125(a) requires notification of any discharge or release to the National Response Center through a toll-free telephone number. The National Response Center (NRC) acts as the central clearinghouse for all pollution incident reporting.

Section 300.135(a) authorizes the predesignated On-Scene Coordinator to direct all federal, state, and private response activities at the site of a discharge.

Section 300.135(d) establishes the unified command structure for managing responses to discharges through coordinated personnel and resources of the federal government, the state government, and the responsible party.

Section 300.165 requires the On-Scene Coordinator to submit to the RRT or the NRT a report on all removal actions taken at a site.

Section 300.170 identifies the responsibilities for federal agencies that may be called upon during response planning and implementation to provide assistance in their respective areas of expertise consistent with the agencies' capabilities and authorities.

Section 300.175 lists the federal agencies that have duties associated with responding to releases.

Section 300.210 defines the objectives, authority, and scope of Federal Contingency Plans, including the National Contingency Plan (NCP), Regional Contingency Plans (RCPs), and Area Contingency Plans (ACPs).

Section 300.317 establishes national priorities for responding to a release.

Section 300.320 establishes the general pattern of response to be executed by the On-Scene Coordinator (OSC), including determination of threat, classification of the size and type of the release, notification of the RRT and the NRC, and supervision of thorough removal actions.

Section 300.322 authorizes the OSC to determine whether a release poses a substantial threat to the public health or welfare of the United States based on several factors, including the size and character of the discharge and its proximity to human populations and sensitive environments. In such cases, the OSC is authorized to direct all federal, state, or private response and recovery actions. The OSC may enlist the support of other federal agencies or special teams.

Section 300.323 provides special consideration to discharges which have been classified as a spill of national significance. In such cases, senior federal officials direct nationally-coordinated response efforts.

Section 300.324 requires the OSC to notify the National Strike Force Coordination Center (NSFCC) in the event of worst case discharges, defined as the largest foreseeable discharge in adverse weather conditions. The NSFCC coordinates the acquisition of needed response personnel and equipment. The OSC also must require implementation of the worst case portion of the tank vessel and Facility Response Plans and the Area Contingency Plan.

Section 300.355 provides funding for responses to oil releases under the Oil Spill Liability Trust Fund, provided certain criteria are met. The responsible party is liable for federal removal costs and damages as detailed in section 1002 of the Oil Pollution Act (OPA). Federal agencies assisting in a response action may be reimbursed. Several other federal agencies may provide financial support for removal actions.

Subpart J establishes the NCP Product Schedule, which contains dispersants and other chemical or biological products that may be used in carrying out the NCP. Authorization for the use of these products is conducted by Regional Response Teams and Area Committees or by the OSC, in consultation with EPA representatives.

Section 300.415(b) authorizes the lead agency to initiate appropriate removal action in the event of a hazardous substance release. Decisions of action will be based on threats to human or animal populations, contamination of drinking water supplies or sensitive ecosystems, high levels of hazardous substances in soils, weather conditions that may cause migration or release of hazardous substances, the threat of fire or explosion, or other significant factors affecting the health or welfare or the public or the environment.

Section 300.415(c) authorizes the OSC to direct appropriate actions to mitigate or remove the release of hazardous substances. .

== See also ==
- Oil spill governance in the United States
