= Oil skimmer =

Oil removal device

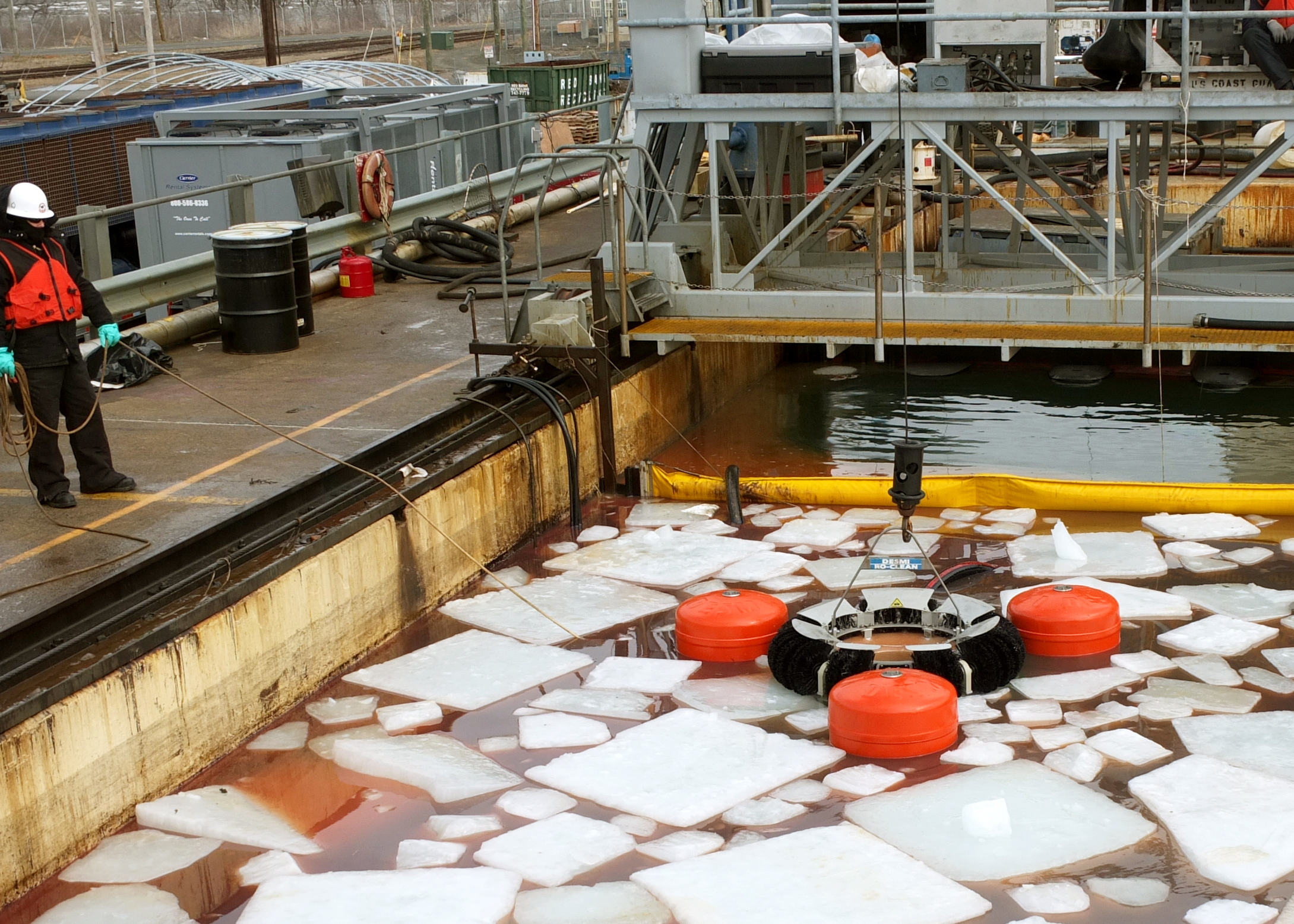
A weir skimmer being tested in cold weather conditions at Ohmsett

An oil skimmer is a device that is designed to remove oil floating on a liquid surface. They are commonly used to recover oil from oil spills in water, or in industrial situations where water is contaminated with oil. Oil skimmers are designed to remove free floating oil and are not water treatment devices.

The effectiveness of a skimmer deployed in open water or oil spill recovery is highly dependent on the roughness of the surrounding water that it is working on; the choppier the surrounding wake and water, the more water the oil skimmer will take in along with the oil, rather than take in oil alone. Oil spill skimmers can be self-propelled, used from shore, or operated from vessels, with the best choice being dependent on the specifics for the job at hand.

Oil skimmers were used to great effect to assist in the remediation of the Exxon Valdez oil spill in 1989.

Oil skimmers are also used in a large number applications other than oil spills. Examples include as a part of oil removal in vehicle wash water, fuel storage sites and workshops. Industries that extensively use oil skimmers include manufacturing, mining, oil and gas, refining, petrochemical, solvent extraction and food industries. Selecting the correct type to use depends on the nature of the intended application and the nature of the oil and water. Oil skimmers are frequently one component of oily water treatment systems.

Oil skimmers are different from swimming pool sanitation skimmers, which are designed for a similar but unrelated purpose.

== Limitations and design factors ==
There are many different types of oil skimmer. Each type has different design features and therefore results in different applications and use. It is important to understand the design features and fluid properties before employing a particular skimmer type.

Some factors to consider are:

- Oil removal flow rate: Alternative Skimmer designs have different oil removal flow rates. Volume removal rates for Oleophilic skimmer types (drum, brush, disc, belt) are comparatively low. Weir type skimmers are capable of very high oil and water removal rates. ASTM F2709 standard establishes the test procedure for determining oil recovery rate (ORR).
- Oil removal concentration: It is a common misconception that oil skimmers remove concentrated or pure 'oil'; when in fact they remove a mixture of oil and water. In most situations the 'oil' mixture removed is an emulsion of oil and water more like a 'mousse'. Oleophilic and Non-Oleophilic skimmers can sometimes provide more concentrated oil in the removal stream, however will still collect entrained water.
- Effectiveness with different oils: Oleophilic and Non-Oleophilic skimmers are not equally effective with all oil types due to the changing nature of the attraction forces with different oils and materials.
- Effectiveness with chemicals in the water: Oleophilic skimmers may not work as effectively if there are detergents, cleaners or other surfactants in the water that interfere with the oleophilic attraction. Weir skimmers are not affected by chemicals.
- Effects of trash and debris: Trash and debris may block or interfere with the operation of oil skimmers.
- Skimming direction: Some skimmers only remove oil from one direction. In some situations, such as skimming from pits and tanks, it can be important to remove oil from all directions.
- Service Access: Some skimmers such as disc skimmers, or weir skimmers with skimmer mounted pumps, contain heavy serviceable items of equipment mounted on the skimmer. This may require special lifting equipment and confined space entry safety considerations before servicing.

== Applications ==
The use of skimmers in industrial applications is often required to remove oils, grease and fats prior to further treatment for environmental discharge compliance. By removing the top layer of oils, water stagnation, smell and unsightly surface scum can be reduced. Placed before an oily water treatment system an oil skimmer may give greater overall oil separation efficiency for improved discharge wastewater quality. All oil skimmers will pick up a percentage of water with the oil which will need to be decanted to obtain concentrated oil.

== Types ==
There are three types of oil skimmers: weir, oleophilic and suction. Oleophilic skimmers include disc, belt, tube, brush, mop, brush, grooved disc, smooth drum, and grooved drum. The material chosen for an oleophilic skimmer affects the collection rate based on the material's affinity for the particular type of oil that is skimmed.

=== Weir ===
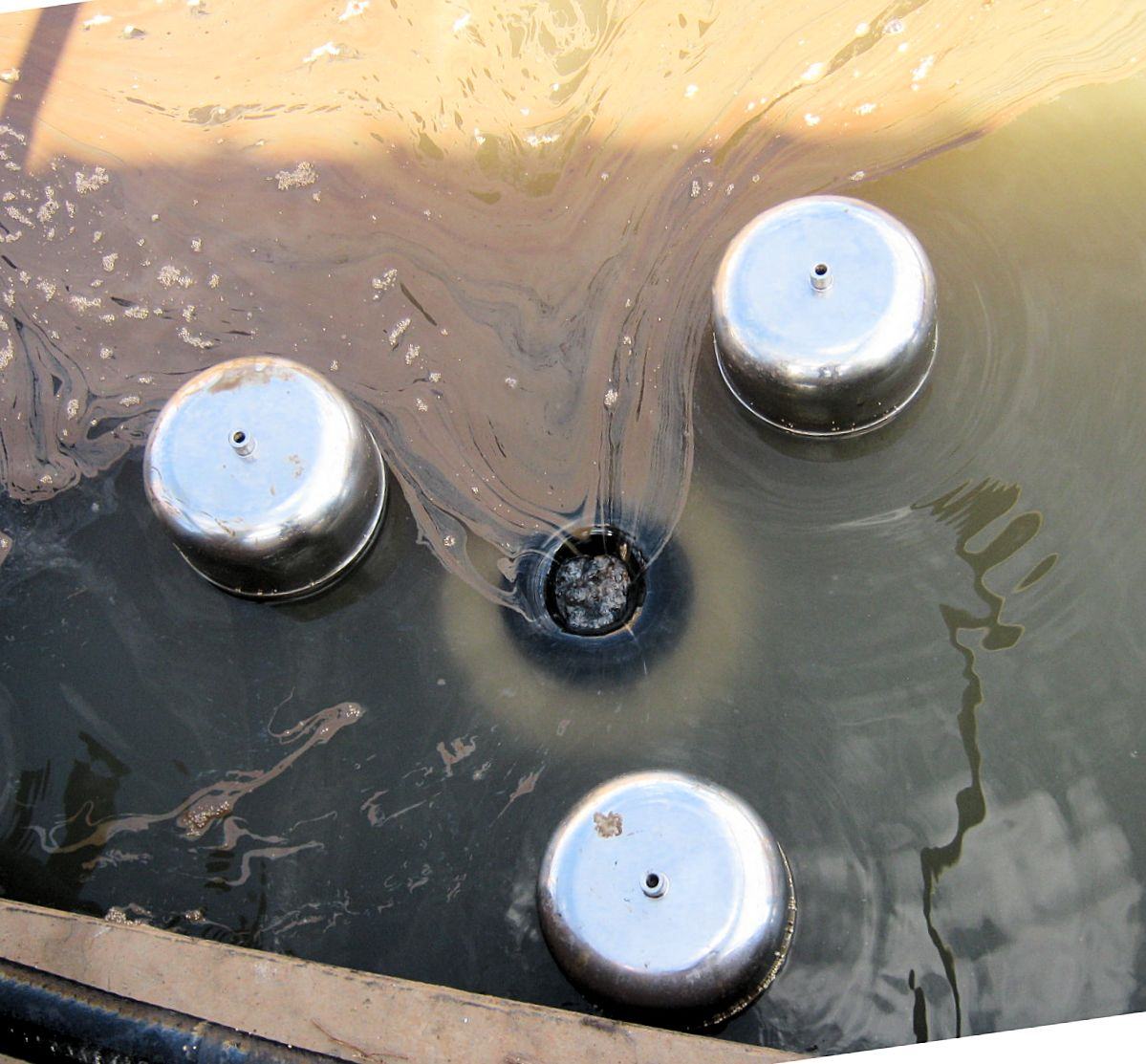
Industrial weir type oil skimmer

Weir skimmers function by allowing the oil floating on the surface of the water to flow over a weir. There are two main types of weir skimmer, those that require the weir height to be manually adjusted and those where the weir height is automatic or self-adjusting. Whilst manually adjusted weir skimmer types can have a lower initial cost, the requirement for regular manual adjustment makes self-adjusting weir types more popular in most applications.

Weir skimmers will collect some water if operating when oil is no longer present. To overcome this limitation most weir type skimmers contain an automatic water drain on the oil collection tank. Large debris 20 mm plus must be prevented from entering a Weir skimmer. This is usually done with simple screens added to the skimmer or in the case of pit operation, screening debris at the entrance to collection pits.

Weir skimmers can remove oil at a greater rate than other types of skimmer. Oil removal rates of over 25 cubic metres per hour (6,600 US gal/h) are available. They can also pull in oil from a greater radius on a surface than other skimmers. This makes weir skimmers popular if high oil recovery rates and large coverage areas are required.

Weir type skimmers do not rely on oil adherence or coalescence and therefore are not affected by detergents, chemicals and other surfactants in the water. They are not affected by fine suspended solids in the water which can impede adherence and therefore the operation of other types of skimmer.

=== Oleophilic ===
Oleophilic skimmers function by using an element such as a drum, disc, belt, rope or mop to which the oil adheres as the element is moved through the oil/water surface. Adhesion is the tendency of dissimilar particles or surfaces to cling to one another (cohesion refers to the tendency of similar or identical particles/surfaces to cling to one another). Any adhering oil is then wiped or scraped from the oleophilic surface and collected in a tank. As the oil adheres to the collection surface the amount of water collected is limited. When there is no oil left, some water will be collecte. The amount collected depends on the material properties of the oleophilic element and its affinity to water. Oilophilic skimmers can remove many kinds of oil; including machine oil, kerosene, diesel oil, lubricating oil, plant oil and other liquids with specific gravity less than water.

Small oleophilic oil skimmers can be reliable and economical. Larger Oleophilic skimmers require larger drive motors with moving mechanical parts and require maintenance. Oleophilic skimmers are not effected by the oil layer thickness.

Recovery rates are lower than other types of skimmer. Recovery rates depend on the surface area of the oleophilic material, the surface speed and the material's affinity to oil as well as other factors such as temperature, specific oil makes-up, debris in the water and other chemicals that maybe present. Surfactants such as detergents, cleaners, caustics and fine suspended solids can impair the ability of oil to adhere to the oleophilic material. Simple tests are available to determine the impairment cause by these chemicals.

Hose/tube

With hose-skimmers, debris is collected via a floating, continuous-loop hose. The advantage is that the variable length of the hose means even large pools can be cleaned effectively. As the hose rotates, it creates a flow on the surface of the pool, which automatically carries the oil towards the hose. Disadvantage: Not suitable for small or very small pools. (Hose skimmers are suitable for pools measuring 400x400mm and above)

==== Belt ====
Belt oil skimmers use a continuous loop belt that enters and exits the oil/water surface. As the belts exits the liquid surface oil clings to both sides. Wiper blades remove the oil from the rotating belt depositing it into a collection trough where it is moved to a storage location either via gravity or a pumping system. Belts are generally wide, thin and flexible.

==== Drum ====
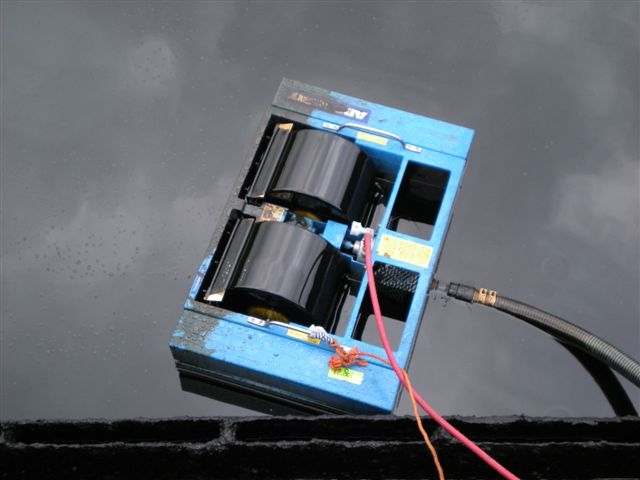
Smooth drum type oil skimmer

Drum skimmers operate by using one or more drums made from oleophilic material. As the drums rotate oil adheres to the surface, separating it from the water. Wiper blades remove the oil from the drums depositing it into the collection trough where it is pumped to a storage location. Drum skimmers are lightweight and may have a high oil recovery rate depending on the size and number of drums used. The drums can be either smooth or grooved. These types of skimmers are generally used in oil spill response and various industrial operations.

==== Disc ====
Disc skimmers are oleophilic skimmers that use a disc constructed from PVC, steel or aluminum and can be either smooth or grooved. They are capable of recovering high volumes of oil with little water. They can be equipped with either a single or multiple discs. The discs can be driven by hydraulic, electric, diesel or air motors. DISCOIL technology patented by OCS in the year 1970, is able to recover most of the hydrocarbons on the surface of water: 98% of oil with the only 2% water. It is hydraulic type and able to operate also in classified areas, as ATEX Zone 0, 1 and 2.

=== Non-oleophilic ===
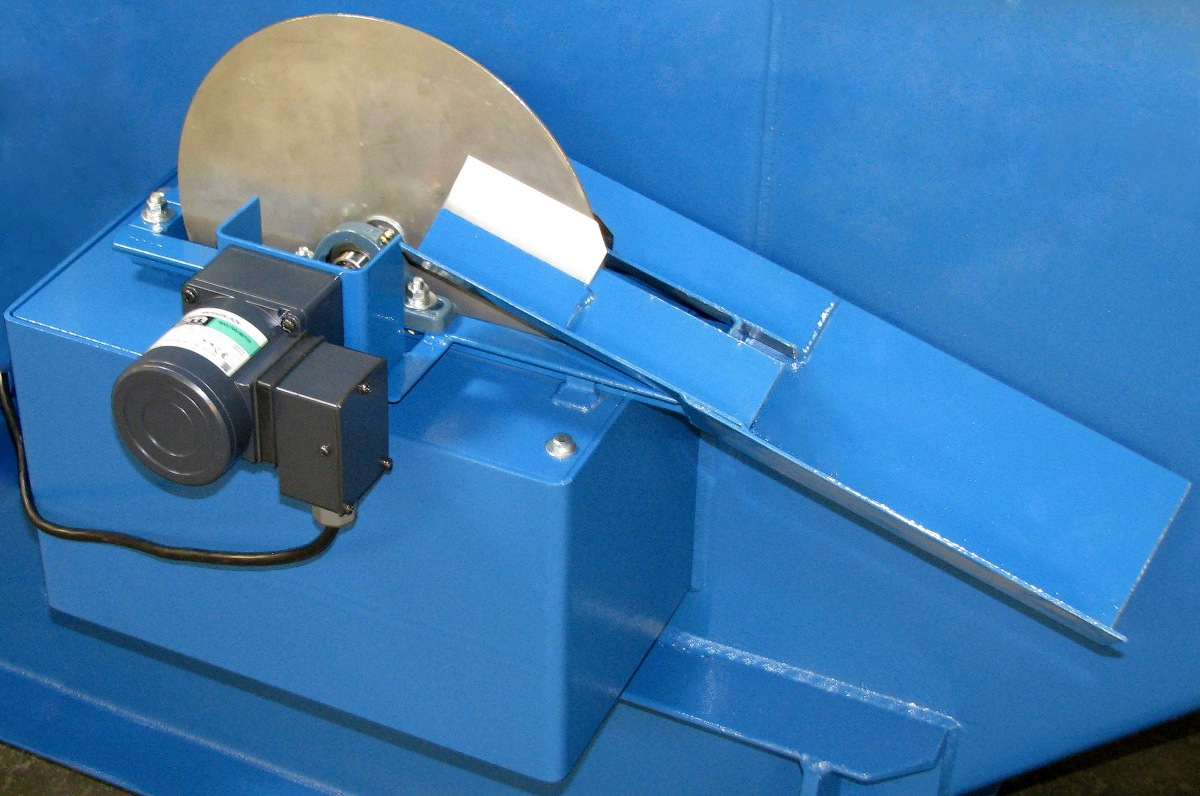
Smooth industrial disc oil skimmer

Non-oleophilic skimmers are distinguished by the component used to collect the oil. A metal disc, belt or drum is used in applications where an polymeric material is inappropriate, such as in a hot alkaline aqueous parts washer. The skimmer is generally turned off whenever there is no oil to skim thus minimizing the amount of water collected. Metal skimming elements are nearly as efficient as oleophilic skimmers when oil is present.

== See also ==
- List of waste-water treatment technologies
