= Low-temperature thermal desorption =

For environmental remediation, Low-temperature thermal desorption (LTTD), also known as low-temperature thermal volatilization, thermal stripping, and soil roasting, is an ex-situ remedial technology that uses heat to physically separate petroleum hydrocarbons from excavated soils. Thermal desorbers are designed to heat soils to temperatures sufficient to cause constituents to volatilize and desorb (physically separate) from the soil. Although they are not designed to decompose organic constituents, thermal desorbers can, depending upon the specific organics present and the temperature of the desorber system, cause some organic constituents to completely or partially decompose. The vaporized hydrocarbons are generally treated in a secondary treatment unit (e.g., an afterburner, catalytic oxidation chamber, condenser, or carbon adsorption unit) prior to discharge to the atmosphere. Afterburners and oxidizers destroy the organic constituents. Condensers and carbon adsorption units trap organic compounds for subsequent treatment or disposal.

Some preprocessing and postprocessing of soil is necessary when using LTTD. Excavated soils are first screened to remove large (greater than 2 inches in diameter) objects. These may be sized (e.g., crushed or shredded) and then introduced back into the feed material. After leaving the desorber, soils are cooled, re-moistened to control dust, and stabilized (if necessary) to prepare them for disposal or reuse. Treated soil may be redeposited onsite, used as cover in landfills, or incorporated into asphalt.

== Application ==
LTTD has proven very effective in reducing concentrations of petroleum products including gasoline, jet fuels, kerosene, diesel fuel, heating oils, and lubricating oils. LTTD is applicable to constituents that are volatile at temperatures up to 1,200 °F. Most desorbers operate at temperatures between 300 °F to 1,000 °F. Desorbers constructed of special alloys can operate at temperatures up to 1,200 °F. More volatile products (e.g. gasoline) can be desorbed at the lower operating range, while semivolatile products (e.g. kerosene, diesel fuel) generally need temperatures over 700 °F, and relatively nonvolatile products (e.g., heating oil, lubricating oils) need even higher temperatures. Essentially all soil types are amenable for treatment by LTTD systems. However, different soils may require varying degrees and types of pretreatment. For example, coarse-grained soils (e.g. gravel and cobbles) may require crushing; fine-grained soils that are excessively cohesive (e.g. clay) may require shredding.

State and local regulations specify that petroleum-contaminated soils must be pilot tested, by some soil from the site being processed through the LTTD system (a "test burn"). The results of preliminary testing of soil samples should identify the relevant constituent properties, and examination of the machine's performance records should indicate how effective the system will be in treating the soil. The proven effectiveness of a particular system for a specific site or waste does not ensure that it will be effective at all sites or that the treatment efficiencies achieved will be acceptable at other sites. If a test burn is conducted, it is important to ensure that the soil tested is representative of average conditions and that enough samples are analyzed before and after treatment to confidently determine whether LTTD will be effective.

Operation of LTTD units requires various permits and demonstration of compliance with permit requirements. Monitoring requirements for LTTD systems are by their nature different from monitoring required at a UST site. Monitoring of LTTD system waste streams (e.g. concentrations of particulates, volatiles, and carbon monoxide in stack gas) are required by the agency or agencies issuing the permits for operation of the facility. The LTTD facility owner/operator is responsible for complying with limits specified by the permits and for other LTTD system operating parameters (e.g. desorber temperature, soil feed rate, afterburner temperature).

The decision as to whether or not LTTD is a practical remedial alternative depends upon site-specific characteristics (e.g. the location and volume of contaminated soils, site layout). Practicability is also determined by regulatory, logistical, and economic considerations. The economics of LTTD as a remedial option are highly site-specific. Economic factors include:-

- Site usage (because excavation and onsite soil treatment at a retail site (e.g. gasoline station, convenience store) will most likely prevent the business from operating for a longish time).
- The cost of LTTD per unit volume of soil relative to other remedial options.
- The location of the nearest applicable LTTD system (because transportation costs are a function of distance).

== Operation principles ==
Thermal desorption systems fall into two general classes—stationary facilities and mobile units. Contaminated soils are excavated and transported to stationary facilities; mobile units can be operated directly onsite. Desorption units are available in a variety of process configurations including rotary desorbers, asphalt plant aggregate dryers, thermal screws, and conveyor furnaces.

The plasticity of the soil is a measure of its ability to deform without shearing and is to some extent a function of water content. Plastic soils tend to stick to screens and other equipment, and agglomerate into large clumps. In addition to slowing down the feed rate, plastic soils are difficult to treat. Heating plastic soils requires higher temperatures because of the low surface area to volume ratio and increased moisture content. Also, because plastic soils tend to be very fine-grained, organic compounds tend to be tightly sorbed. Thermal treatment of highly plastic soils requires pretreatment, such as shredding or blending with more friable soils or other amendments (e.g. gypsum).

Material larger than 2 inches in diameter will need to be crushed or removed. Crushed material is recycled back into the feed to be processed. Coarser-grained soils tend to be free-flowing and do not agglomerate into clumps. They typically do not retain excessive moisture, therefore, contaminants are easily desorbed. Finer-grained soils tend to retain soil moisture and agglomerate into clumps. When dry, they may yield large amounts of particulates that may require recycling after being intercepted in the baghouse.

The solids processing capacity of a thermal desorption system is inversely proportional to the moisture content of the feed material. The presence of moisture in the excavated soils to be treated in the LTTD unit will determine the residence time required and heating requirements for effective removal of contaminants. In order for desorption of petroleum constituents to occur, most of the soil moisture must be evaporated in the desorber. This process can require significant additional thermal input to the desorber and excessive residence time for the soil in the desorber. Moisture content also influences plasticity which affects handling of the soil. Soils with excessive moisture content (> 20%) must be dewatered. Typical dewatering methods include air drying (if storage space is available to spread the soils), mixing with drier soils, or mechanical dewatering.

The presence of metals in soil can have two implications:

- Limitations on disposal of the solid wastes generated by desorption.
- Attention to air pollution control regulations that limit the amount of metals that may be released in stack emissions.

At normal LTTD operating temperatures, heavy metals are not likely to be significantly separated from soils.

High concentrations of petroleum products in soil can result in high soil heating values. Heat released from soils can result in overheating and damage to the desorber. Soils with heating values greater than 2,000 Btu/lb require blending with cleaner soils to dilute the high concentration of hydrocarbons. High hydrocarbon concentrations in the offgas may exceed the thermal capacity of the afterburner and potentially result in the release of untreated vapors into the atmosphere. Excessive constituent levels in soil could also potentially result in the generation of vapors in the desorber at concentrations exceeding the lower explosive limit (LEL). If the LEL is exceeded there is a potential for explosion.

== System design ==
The term "thermal desorber" describes the primary treatment operation that heats petroleum-contaminated materials and desorbs organic materials into a purge gas. Mechanical design features and process operating conditions vary considerably among the various types of LTTD systems. Desorption units are: available in four configurations:

1. Rotary dryer
2. Asphalt plant aggregate dryer
3. Thermal screw
4. Conveyor furnace

Although all LTTD systems use heat to separate (desorb) organic contaminants from the soil matrix, each system has a different configuration with its own set of advantages and disadvantages. The decision to use one system over another depends on the nature of the contaminants as well as machine availability, system performance, and economic considerations. System performance may be evaluated on the basis of pilot tests (e.g., test burns) or examination of historical machine performance records. Pilot tests to develop treatment conditions are generally not necessary for petroleum-contaminated soils.

=== Rotary dryer ===
Rotary dryer systems use a cylindrical metal reactor (drum) that is inclined slightly from the horizontal. A burner located at one end provides heat to raise the temperature of the soil sufficiently to desorb organic contaminants. The flow of soil may be either cocurrent with or countercurrent to the direction of the purge gas flow. As the drum rotates, soil is conveyed through the drum. Lifters raise the soil, carrying it to near the top of the drum before allowing it to fall through the heated purge gas. Mixing in a rotary dryer enhances heat transfer by convection and allow soils to be rapidly heated. Rotary desorber units are manufactured for a wide range of treatment capacities; these units may be either stationary or mobile.

The maximum soil temperature that can be obtained in a rotary dryer depends on the composition of the dryer shell. The soil discharge temperature of carbon steel drums is typically 300 to 600 degrees F. Alloy drums are available that can increase the soil discharge temperature to 1,200 degrees F. Most rotary dryers that are used to treat petroleum contaminated soil are made of carbon steel. After the treated soil exits the rotary dryer, it enters a cooling conveyor where water is sprayed on the soil for cooling and dust control. Water addition may be conducted in either a screw conveyor or a pugmill.

Besides the direction of purge gas flow relative to soil feed direction, there is one major difference in configuration between countercurrent and cocurrent rotary dryers. The purge gas from a countercurrent rotary dryer is typically only 350 °F to 500 °F and does not require cooling before entering the baghouse where fine particles are trapped. A disadvantage is that these particles may not have been decontaminated and are typically recycled to the dryer. Countercurrent dryers have several advantages over cocurrent systems. They are more efficient in transferring heat from purge gas to contaminated soil, and the volume and temperature of exit gas are lower, allowing the gas to go directly to a baghouse without needing to be cooled. The cooler exit gas temperature and smaller volume eliminates the need for a cooling unit, which allows downstream processing equipment to be smaller. Countercurrent systems are effective on petroleum products with molecular weights lower than No.2 fuel oil.

In cocurrent systems, the purge gas is 50 °F to 100 °F hotter than the soil discharge temperature. The result is that the purge gas exit temperature may range from 400 °F to 1,000 °F and cannot go directly to the baghouse. Purge gas first enters an afterburner to decontaminate the fine particles, then goes into a cooling unit prior to introduction into the baghouse. Because of the higher temperature and volume of the purge gas, the baghouse and all other downstream processing equipment must be larger than in a countercurrent system. Cocurrent systems do have several advantages over countercurrent systems: The afterburner is located upstream of the baghouse ensuring that fine particles are decontaminated; and because the heated purge gas is introduced at the same end of the drum as the feed soil, the soil is heated faster, resulting in a longer residence time. Higher temperatures and longer residence time mean that cocurrent systems can be used to treat soils contaminated with heavier petroleum products. Cocurrent systems are effective for light and heavy petroleum products including No. 6 fuel oil, crude oil, motor oil, and lubricating oil.

=== Asphalt plant aggregate dryer ===
Hot-mix asphalt plants use aggregate that has been processed in a dryer before it is mixed with liquid asphalt. The use of petroleum contaminated soils for aggregate material is widespread. Aggregate dryers may either be stationary or mobile. Soil treatment capacities range from 25-150 tons per hour. The soil may be incorporated into the asphalt as a recycling process or the treated soil may be used for other purposes.

Asphalt rotary dryers are normally constructed of carbon steel and have a soil discharge temperature of 300 °F to 600 °F. Typically, asphalt plant aggregate dryers are identical to the countercurrent rotary desorbers described above and are effective on the same types of contaminants. The primary difference is that an afterburner is not required for incorporation of clean aggregate into the asphalt mix. In some areas, asphalt plants that use petroleum-contaminated soil for aggregate may be required to be equipped with an afterburner.

=== Thermal screw ===
A thermal screw desorber typically consists of a series of 1-4 augers. The auger system conveys, mixes, and heats contaminated soils to volatilize moisture and organic contaminants into a purge gas stream. Augers can be arranged in series to increase the soil residence time, or they can be configured in parallel to increase throughput capacity. Most thermal screw systems circulate a hot heat-transfer oil through the hollow flights of the auger and return the hot oil through the shaft to the heat transfer fluid heating system. The heated oil is also circulated through the jacketed trough in which each auger rotates. Thermal screws can also be steam-heated. Systems heated with oil can achieve soil temperatures of up to 500 °F, and steam-heated systems can heat soil to approximately 350 °F.

Most of the gas generated during heating of the heat-transfer oil does not come into contact the waste material and can be discharged directly to the atmosphere without emission controls. The remainder of the flue gas maintains the thermal screw purge gas exit temperature above 300 degrees F. This ensures that volatilized organics and moisture do not condense. In addition, the recycled flue gas has a low oxygen content (less than 2% by volume) which minimizes oxidation of the organics and reduces the explosion hazard. If pretreatment analytical data indicates a high organic content (greater than 4 percent), use of a thermal screw is recommended. After the treated soil exits the thermal screw, water is sprayed on the soil for cooling and dust control. Thermal screws are available with soil treatment capacities ranging from 3-15 tons per hour.

Since thermal screws are indirectly heated, the volume of purge gas from the primary thermal treatment unit is less than one half of the volume from a directly heated system with an equivalent soil processing capacity. Therefore, offgas treatment systems consist of relatively small unit operations that are well suited to mobile applications. Indirect heating also allows thermal screws to process materials with high organic contents since the recycled flue gas is inert, thereby reducing the explosion hazard.

=== Conveyor furnace ===
A conveyor furnace uses a flexible metal belt to convey soil through the primary heating chamber. A one-inch-deep layer of soil is spread evenly over the belt. As the belt moves through the system, soil agitators lift the belt and turn the soil to enhance heat transfer and volatilization of organics. The conveyor furnace can heat soils to temperatures from 300 to 800 degrees F. At the higher temperature range, the conveyor furnace is more effective in treating some heavier petroleum hydrocarbons than are oil- or steam-heated thermal screws, asphalt plant aggregate dryers, and carbon steel rotary dryers. After the treated soil exits the conveyor furnace, it is sprayed with water for cooling and dust control. As of February 1993, only one conveyor furnace system was currently in use for the remediation of petroleum contaminated soil. This system is mobile and can treat 5 to 10 tons of soil per hour.

== Offgas treatment ==
Offgas treatment systems for LTTD systems are designed to address three types of air pollutants: particulates, organic vapors, and carbon monoxide. Particulates are controlled with both wet (e.g., venturi scrubbers) and dry (e.g., cyclones, baghouses) unit operations. Rotary dryers and asphalt aggregate dryers most commonly use dry gas cleaning unit operations. Cyclones are used to capture large particulates and reduce the particulate load to the baghouse. Baghouses are used as the final particulate control device. Thermal screw systems typically use a venturi scrubber as the primary particulate control.

The control of organic vapors is achieved by either destruction or collection. Afterburners are used downstream of rotary dryers and conveyor furnaces to destroy organic contaminants and oxidize carbon monoxide. Conventional afterburners are designed so that exit gas temperatures reach 1,400 °F to 1,600 °F. Organic destruction efficiency typically ranges from 95% to greater than 99%.

Condensers and activated carbon may also be used to treat the offgas from thermal screw systems. Condensers may be either water-cooled or electrically cooled systems to decrease offgas temperatures to 100 °F to 140 °F. The efficiency of condensers for removing organic compounds ranges from 50% to greater than 95%. Noncondensible gases exiting the condenser are normally treated by a vapor-phase activated carbon treatment system. The efficiency of activated carbon adsorption systems for removing organic contaminants ranges from 50% to 99%. Condensate from the condenser is processed through a phase separator where the non-aqueous phase organic component is separated and disposed of or recycled. The remaining water is then processed through activated carbon and used to rehumidify treated soil.

Treatment temperature is a key parameter affecting the degree of treatment of organic components. The required treatment temperature depends upon the specific types of petroleum contamination in the soil. The actual temperature achieved by an LTTD system is a function of the moisture content and heat capacity of the soil, soil particle size, and the heat transfer and mixing characteristics of the thermal desorber.

Residence time is a key parameter affecting the degree to which decontamination is achievable. Residence time depends upon the design and operation of the system, characteristics of the contaminants and the soil, and the degree of treatment required.
