= Ohmsett =

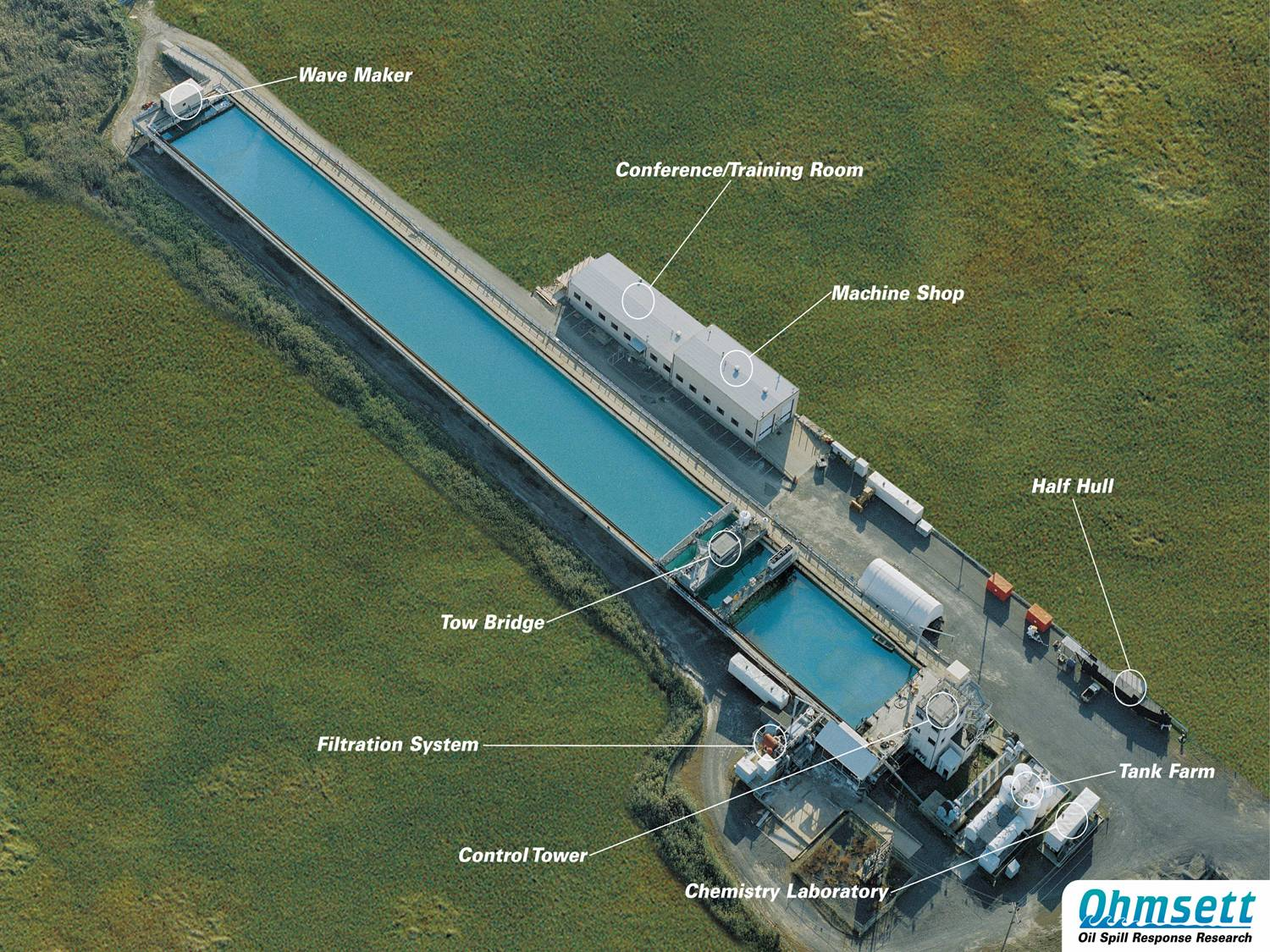
- Overhead schematic of Ohmsett
- Interactive map of the Ohmsett area
- Former names: Oil and Hazardous Materials Simulated Environmental Test Tank
- Alternative names: National Oil Spill Response & Renewable Energy Test Facility

General information
- Status: Completed
- Location: Naval Weapons Station Earle, Leonardo, New Jersey, United States
- Coordinates: 40.425364°N 74.06756°W
- Named for: Oil and Hazardous Materials Simulated Environmental Test Tank
- Opened: 1973 (as OHMSETT); 1992 (as Ohmsett)
- Renovated: 1990
- Closed: 1989 (as OHMSETT)
- Owner: Minerals Management Service under the U.S. Department of the Interior
- Operator: Applied Research Associates

Dimensions
- Diameter: 667 by 65 feet (203 m × 20 m)
- Other dimensions: 11 feet (3.4 m) deep filled with 2,600,000 US gallons (9,800,000 L; 2,200,000 imp gal) of salt water.

Website
- ohmsett.bsee.gov

Ohmsett is the National Oil Spill Response & Renewable Energy Test Facility, located in Leonardo, New Jersey. The name Ohmsett is an acronym for "Oil and Hazardous Materials Simulated Environmental Test Tank".

== Facility ==
This is the only facility of its kind where full-scale oil spill response equipment testing, research, and training can be conducted in a marine environment with oil under controlled environmental conditions. Variables such as waves, temperature, and oil types are able to be controlled. A benefit of this facility is that it provides an environmentally safe place to conduct objective testing and to develop devices and techniques for the control of oil and hazardous material spills.

The mission of Ohmsett is to strengthen awareness of oil spill pollution prevention and response methods, while at the same time remaining committed to the well being of its customers, employees, and associates.

The facility, located an hour south of New York City, located on the ground of Naval Weapons Station Earle in Leonardo, New Jersey, is maintained and operated by the Bureau of Safety and Environmental Enforcement (BSEE), a bureau of the U.S. Department of the Interior that manages the nation's natural gas, oil and other mineral resources on the outer continental shelf (OCS). Applied Research Associates performs the operation and maintenance of Ohmsett for the BSEE.

== History ==
in 1974 the U.S. Environmental Protection Agency built the Ohmsett facility in Leonardo, NJ and operated it until 1987. At that time, it was known as the Oil and Hazardous Materials Simulated Environmental Test Tank, or OHMSETT. It is now just referred to by the acronym. In 1989, Ohmsett was closed and responsibility for the facility was transferred to the U.S. Navy because the facility is located on the Naval Weapons Station Earle.

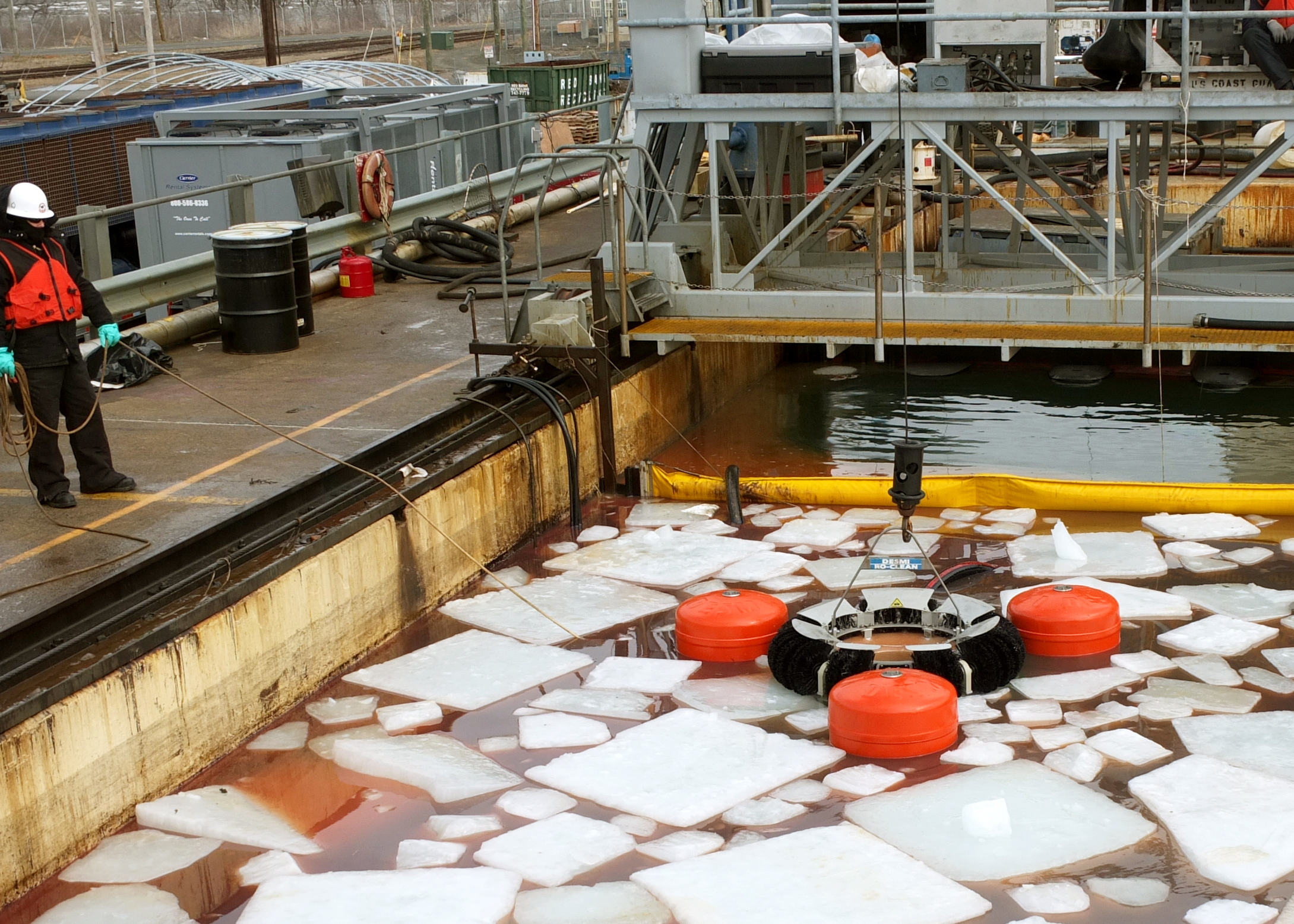
An oil skimmer being tested in cold weather conditions at Ohmsett

In the aftermath of the Exxon Valdez oil spill in Alaska Title VII of the Oil Pollution Act of 1990 (OPA 90) gave Minerals Management Service (MMS) the lead responsibility for reactivation of Ohmsett. The MMS was charged to continue operation and maintenance of the facility as a national test facility. The MMS refurbished Ohmsett beginning in 1990 and reopened it for testing in 1992. Costs for the yearly operation and maintenance of Ohmsett are covered by the Oil Spill Liability Trust Fund (OSTLF). The OSTLF derives its funds from a tax on companies that produce or transport oil. Because of this, no appropriated taxpayer dollars are used to support this unique oil spill response technology testing, training, and research facility.

In 2011, the Bureau of Safety and Environmental Enforcement took over the task of the MMS.

== See also ==
- Petroleum in the United States
- Environmental issues in the United States
