= Bureau of Safety and Environmental Enforcement =

American government parastatal

Agency overview
- Formed: October 1, 2011
- Preceding agency: Minerals Management Service
- Dissolved: July 10, 2026
- Superseding agency: Marine Minerals Administration
- Headquarters: Main Interior Building Washington, D.C.
- Employees: 881 FTE (2016)
- Annual budget: $204.6 million USD (2016)
- Agency executive: Kenneth Stevens, Acting Director
- Parent agency: Department of the Interior
- Website: Official website

The Bureau of Safety and Environmental Enforcement (BSEE /ˈbɛsi/ "Bessie") was an agency under the United States Department of the Interior.

Established in 2011, the agency was responsible for improving safety and ensuring environmental protection in the offshore energy industry, mainly natural gas and oil, on the United States Outer Continental Shelf (OCS). The agency oversaw the safety and environmental enforcement functions formerly under the Minerals Management Service, including the authority to inspect, investigate, summon witnesses, produce evidence, levy penalties, cancel or suspend activities, oversee safety, response, and removal preparedness.

== History ==
BSEE was established in response to the regulatory failure of the Minerals Management Service (MMS) in the Deepwater Horizon oil spill of 2010. Secretarial Order 3299, signed by then Secretary of the Interior Ken Salazar on May 19, 2010, created the agency. Order 3299 also created the Bureau of Ocean Energy Management (BOEM) and the Office of Natural Resources Revenue (ONRR).

The creation of the three independent entities was designed to carry out three missions:

- Ensuring the balance and responsible development of energy resources on the Outer Continental Shelf (OCS).
- Ensuring safe and environmentally responsible exploration and production and enforcing applicable rules and regulations.
- Ensuring a fair return to the taxpayer from offshore royalty and revenue collection and disbursement activities.

On June 18, 2010, Secretarial Order 3302 briefly renamed the MMS to the Bureau of Ocean Energy Management, Regulation and Enforcement (BOEMRE). This name was in effect until the official establishment of BSEE on October 1, 2011. On September 16, 2011, Salazar named former MMS Director Michael R. Bromwich as BSEE's first director. On November 14, 2011, Salazar named Coast Guard Rear Admiral James A. Watson as BSEE's second director.

On August 14, 2013, Interior Secretary Sally Jewell named former Coast Guard Vice Admiral Brian Salerno as BSEE's third director. In 2013, BSEE and the U.S. Department of Transportation Statistics (BTS) signed an Interagency Agreement (IAA) to create SafeOCS, for voluntary confidential reporting of 'near misses' happening on the Outer Continental Shelf. It was later expanded to include mandatory reporting of equipment failure data as required in 30 CFR 250.730 and 30 CFR 250.803.

In 2016, BSEE finalized Well Control Rule. Phased in over time (starting on July 28, 2016), the reform will establish regulations to prevent another Deepwater Horizon tragedy and other well control incidents. In addition, it will implement new and revised industry standards as well as codification of decades worth of BSEE policies.

Key points of the Well Control Rule:

- Incorporate industry standards as baseline
- Establish criteria for maintenance and repair of blowout preventers (BOP)
- Safe drilling practices and procedures
- Real time monitoring requirements
- Third party certification programs

In 2016, NASA and BSEE entered into a five-year interagency agreement (IAA). Under the agreement, NASA will assist BSEE in further developing risk management using NASA's probabilistic risk assessment (PRA) technique. In February 2016, the Government Accountability Office (GAO) determined that the reorganization had made only limited progress in enhancing BSEE's investigative and enforcement capabilities. Then, in March 2017, the GAO determined that BSEE had not successfully implemented its strategic or management initiatives.

On May 23, 2017, Interior Secretary Ryan Zinke named former Louisiana interim-Lieutenant Governor Scott Angelle as BSEE's fourth director, who served until his resignation on January 20, 2021. On March 28, 2022, Kevin M. Sligh Sr. was appointed as BSEE's fifth director, and served until his resignation on September 6, 2024. Kathryn E. Kovacs was appointed as BSEE's sixth director from September 6, 2024 until January 20, 2025.

On July 10, 2026, Secretary of the Interior Doug Burgum issued Secretarial Order 3451, establishing the Marine Minerals Administration (MMA) and reuniting the functions of BOEM and BSEE within a single organization. The reorganization consolidated offshore resource planning, leasing, permitting, inspections, safety enforcement, and environmental oversight while preserving the agencies’ existing statutory authorities and regulations.

== Divisions ==
=== Office of Offshore Regulatory Programs (OORP) ===
The Office of Offshore Regulatory Programs (OORP) manages rules, standards and compliance programs in charge of oil, gas, and mineral operations on the Outer Continental Shelf. Branches under the OORP are responsible for regulations and associated policy documents of the OCS. Additionally, programs cover safety management, pollution prevention research, technology assessments, inspection policies and the development of BSEE's technical training.

=== Oil Spill Preparedness Division (OSPD) ===
BSEE oversees oil spill planning and preparedness for oil and gas production facilities in U.S. waters (see 30 CFR part 254). Some of the main functions of its Oil Spill Preparedness Division (OSPD) division include the approval of oil spill response plans, inspection of oil spill response equipment, conducting oil spill response research, and auditing responder and management team training and exercises. OSPD currently manages the Ohmsett National Spill Response Test Facility, located in Leonardo, New Jersey.

=== Environmental Compliance Division (ECD) ===
The Environmental Compliance Division (ECD) monitors, verifies and enforces the offshore industry's compliance with environmental standards in operations on the Outer Continental Shelf (OCS). ECD is responsible for compliancy with the National Environmental Policy Act (NEPA) in regards to BSEE's OCS operations. Other responsibilities include coordination with the Bureau of Ocean Energy Management (BOEM) and other Federal, State and local agencies and public outreach regarding environmental compliance. Engineers and scientists working under the ECD are BSEE's national coordinators for various environmental programs including Air Quality, Archaeological and Cultural Resources, Marine Ecology, Marine Trash and Debris Oversight, and the Rigs-to-Reefs (R2R) Artificial Reef Program

=== Safety & Incident Investigation Division (SIID) ===
The Safety and Incident Division (SIID) is responsible for establishing national policies relating to the conduct of investigations of safety incidents happening on the OCS. This division also establishes national policies regarding investigator training. SIID at BSEE headquarters in Washington D.C., manages the National Investigations Program and coordinates the training for investigators and provides support to the regional and district levels.

== Budget ==
As of 2016, BSEE had a $204.6 million budget and 881 full-time employees (FTE), requesting $204.8 million and no increase in FTE for fiscal year 2017.

== Offices ==
Regional offices are in Anchorage, Alaska, Camarillo, California, New Orleans, Louisiana, and district offices along the Gulf of Mexico coast.

== Publications ==
=== BSEE Annual Reports ===
Annual reports from BSEE have been issued since 2014. This report highlights the achievements of the agency, its plans for the future, and statistics of safety incidents.

=== BSEE FY Greenbook ===
BSEE Greenbook is the United States Department of the Interior's (DOI) budget justifications for the upcoming fiscal year.

=== Notice to Lessees (NTLs) and Letter to Lessees (LTLs) ===
NTLs and LTLs are formal documents that clarify, describe, and interpret BSEE regulations or Outer Continental Shelf (OCS) standards. They give guidelines in implementation of lease stipulations or regional requirements and explain the scope and meaning of a regulation. NTLs also may communicate administrative information including current telephone numbers and changes in addresses of BSEE offices or personnel. NTLs and LTLs are currently archived on BSEE's website.

=== BSEE Data Center ===
BSEE maintains statistics & a database containing public information on various topics including leasing information, pipelines, permitting, platform/rig, and production information. Data is available in the form of online queries, PDFs, ASCII files, and scanned documents. Information may be cross-referenced among different subject headings.

== See also ==
- Deepwater Horizon oil spill
- Title 30 of the Code of Federal Regulations
- United States Department of the Interior
