= Office of Natural Resources Revenue =

Unit of United States Department of the Interior

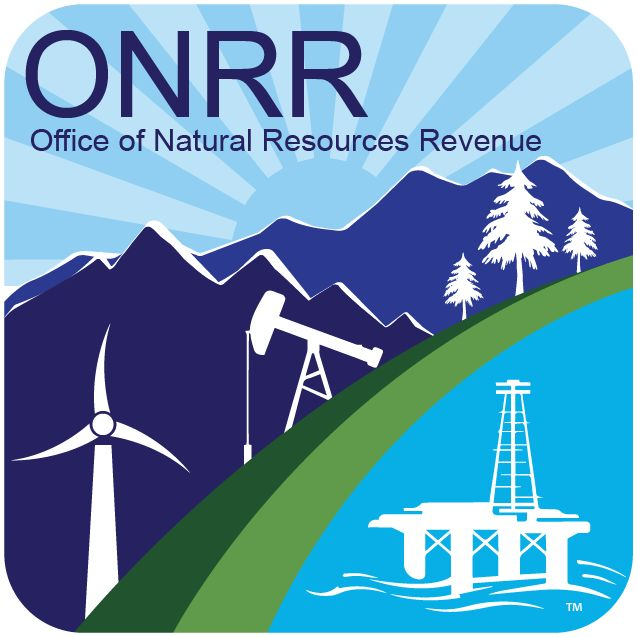

Agency overview
- Formed: October 1, 2011
- Preceding agency: Minerals Management Service
- Headquarters: Lakewood, Colorado
- Employees: 624 FTE (2021)
- Annual budget: N/A
- Agency executives: Howard Cantor, Director; April Lockler, Deputy Director
- Parent agency: Department of the Interior
- Website: www.onrr.gov

Footnotes
- http://onrr.gov/About/default.htm

The Office of Natural Resources Revenue (ONRR) is a unit of the United States Department of the Interior, established by Secretarial Order. The new office exercises the royalty and revenue management functions formerly under the Minerals Management Service, including royalty and revenue collection, distribution, auditing and compliance, investigation and enforcement, and asset management for both onshore and offshore works.

== See also ==
- Title 30 of the Code of Federal Regulations
