= Timeline of the Deepwater Horizon oil spill (June 2010) =

Following is a timeline of the Deepwater Horizon oil spill for June 2010.

== June 1–5 ==
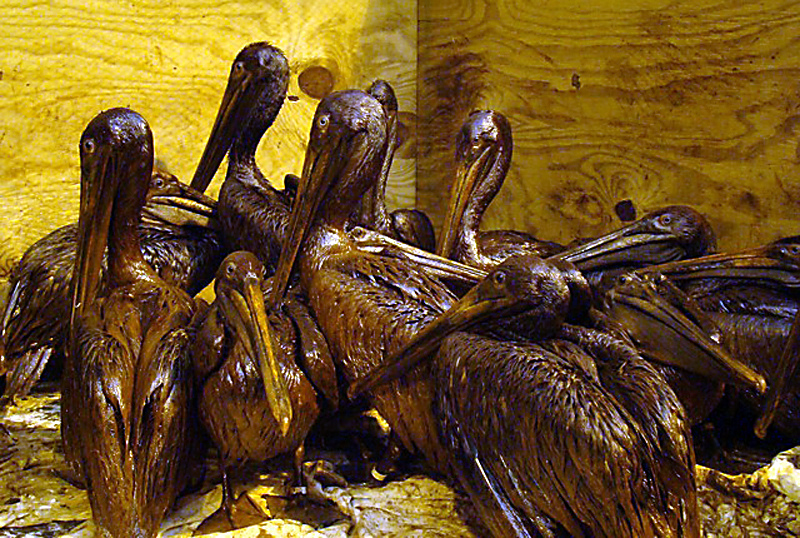
Oil-fouled pelicans on June 3

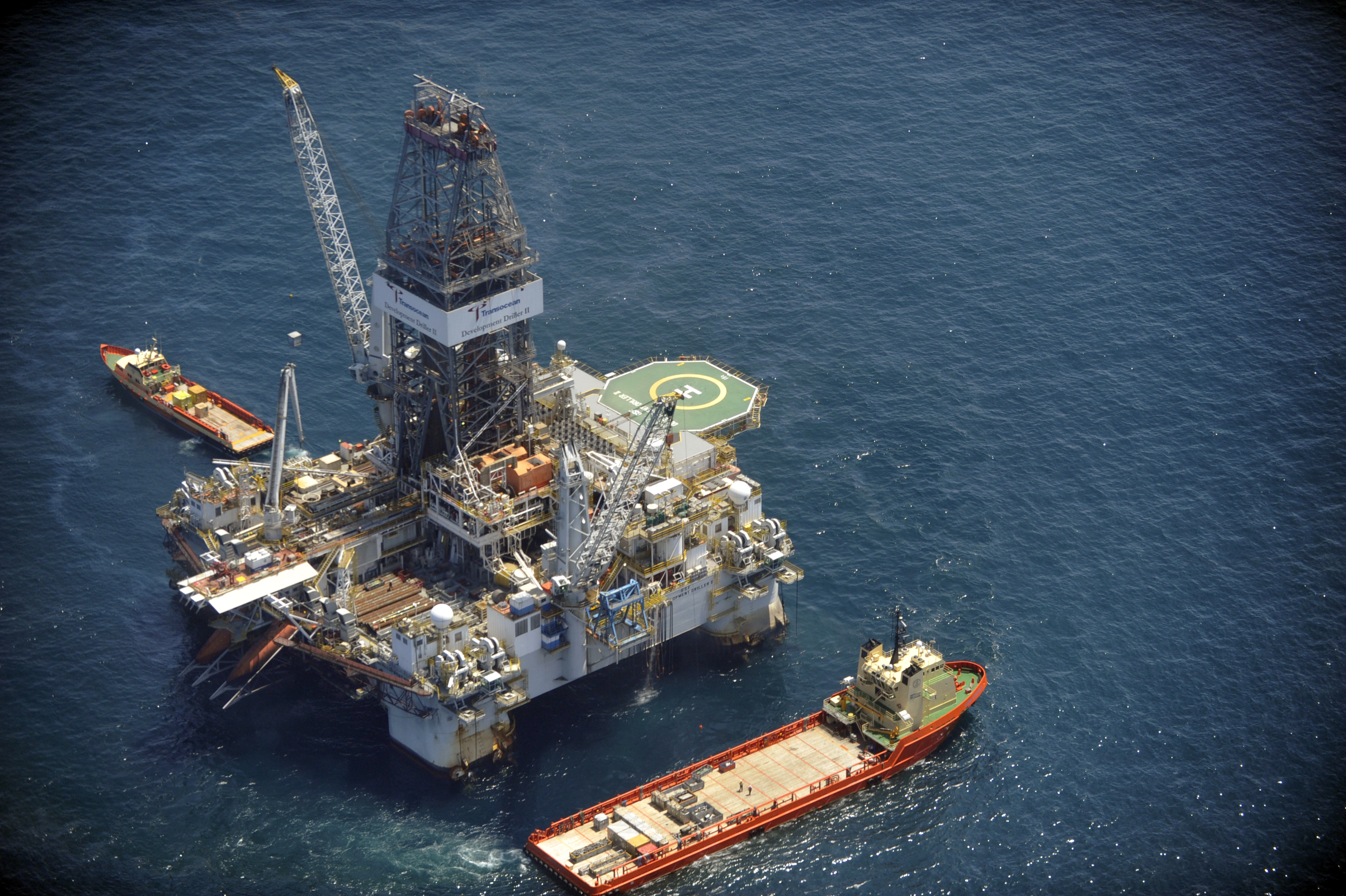
Development Driller II on site

- June 1

- United States attorney general Eric Holder said his office was going to investigate possible criminal prosecutions. He specifically said they are investigating Clean Water Act, Oil Pollution Act of 1990, Migratory Bird Treaty Act, Endangered Species Act.
- Coast Guard Rear Adm. Mary Landry steps down as federal on-scene coordinator and is succeeded by her assistant James A. Watson.
- 2010 Atlantic hurricane season begins. Oil reaches on the beaches of Gulf Islands National Seashore.

- June 2

- Oil spotted 9 miles (14 km) from Pensacola, Florida beaches.
- Louisiana Governor Bobby Jindal sends Obama letter opposing the six-month moratorium on new deepwater rigs.
- White House approves construction of five new sand berms in addition to the one approved the week before sending the $360 million bill to BP. The berms with sand from the Gulf floor will act as barrier islands.

- June 3

- BP begins airing an ad which features Tony Hayward and has the tagline: "We will get this done. We will make this right." It was reportedly prepared by Washington, D.C.-based "Purple Strategies" of political consultants Democrat Steve McMahon and Republican Alex Castellanos. It has an estimated budget of $50 million.
- Moody's estimates that the insured loss on the spill will be $1.4 billion and $3.5 billion. Moody's notes that BP's insured loss would have been more if it were not insuring with its captive insurer Jupiter Insurance of Guernsey. Jupiter has established loss reserves of $700 million. AM Best raises Jupiter's outlook from negative to stable. Liabilities beyond the insured losses would have to be absorbed by various involved including its three owners (BP: 65%; Anadarko Petroleum: 25%, Mitsui Oil Exploration Co. (MOECO) subsidiary of Mitsui: 10%).
- Transocean to be added to the Swiss Market Index on June 21.
- BP releases 24 ROV live streaming video feeds (2 each from the Boa Deep C, Discoverer Enterprise, Ocean Intervention III, Q4000, Skandi Neptune, Viking Poseidon).

- June 4

- Tar balls arrive on beaches in Pensacola, Florida. However, Escambia County, Florida officials do not close the beaches.
- Mississippi has not closed its beaches (with the exception of Petit Bois Island and Horn Island). Alabama warns visitors to stay out of the water on all of its ocean beaches.
- BP says it has paid $84 million reimbursing people for loss of income. BP closing stock price 37.16 Louisiana State University say they have discovered an underwater plume 75 miles (120 km) northwest of the well.
- Ecosphere Technologies - a diversified water engineering and environmental services company - deployed a non-chemical water treatment system to assist in the remediation efforts.

- June 5

- Obama in his third trip to Louisiana since the disaster began visits Grand Isle, Louisiana for the second time in two weeks.
- Obama criticized BP for paying $50 million for television advertising and planning to pay $10.5 billion in quarterly dividends.
- Obama in his weekly radio address said 20,000 people are involved, he has authorized the deployment of 17,500 National Guard troops, that 1,900 boats were working on the spill and 4.3 million feet of boom had been deployed.
- Thad W. Allen says that a cap intended to capture oil and pump it to the surface is capturing about 1,000 barrels (42,000 US gallons; 160,000 litres) a day.
- BP claims the cap captured 6,077 barrels (255,200 US gallons; 966,200 litres) on its first day.
- The NOAA "No Fish Boundary" extends 78,603 square miles (203,600 km^{2}), or about 33% of the federal waters in the Gulf of Mexico covering an area roughly from Dry Tortugas, Florida in the south to Panama City, Florida in the northeast and Morgan City, Louisiana in the northwest.
- BP confirms it purchased keyword search terms such as "oil spill" from Google, Yahoo and Bing so that the sponsored link at the top of the page goes to a BP page. The tag on the sponsored link for "oil spill" says "Info about the Gulf of Mexico Spill Learn More about How BP is Helping."

== June 6–10 ==
- June 6

- Both the Coast Guard and BP say the cap is capturing 10,000 barrels (420,000 US gallons; 1,600,000 litres) a day.
- The New York Times reports in an article headlined "BP Pays Out Claims, but Satisfaction Is Not Included" that BP has 25 claims offices across the Gulf and has paid $46 million to 17,500 residents. BP said it is still processing another 17,500 claims. BP is paying fishing boat captains $5,000/month and deck hands $2,500.
- Mississippi Governor Haley Barbour tells Fox News Sunday that "we have had virtually no oil" wash up on the Mississippi coast.
- Hayward tells the BBC that he has not spoken directly to Obama since the spill started. Hayward says BP scientists have "no evidence" of plumes.
- BP abandons plans to close three remaining vents on the containment cap noting that with one vent it is capturing as much oil as it can handle.

- June 7

- A report on June 6 that oiled birds had washed ashore in Texas is called erroneous by various government officials who note the slick is more than 100 miles (160 km) from Texas.
- Senator Bill Nelson tells MSNBC he has seen reports that oil is now rising from the sea bed itself rather a broken pipe from above indicating the BP well bore and casing integrity has failed.
- White House Press Secretary Robert Gibbs said BP could be fined $4,300 per barrel. The White House says it favors raising the $75 million cap on liability damages for drilling rigs.
- Officials say the cap is working and is approaching handling the maximum of 15,000 barrels (630,000 US gallons; 2,400,000 litres) per day that its gathering drillship the Discoverer Enterprise can handle. The Helix Energy Solutions Group Q4000 is to be configured to handle the excess. The Q4000 is onsite because it was used in the failed Top kill procedure. Part of the reconfiguring involves replacing the current cap on the blowout preventer with a new larger cap.
- Members of the Flow Rate Technical Group, which is a government group appointed to standardize the flow estimates from the leak, say it is impossible to make calculations without high resolution video and the lack of any formal measurement of the flow. One of the members of the group, Ira Leifer, said that the current operation may have actually increased the leak multifold rather than 20 percent that BP had suggested noting that video feeds show the leak to be the same or worse than it was before. Leifer said the pipe could be spewing 100,000 barrels (4,200,000 US gallons; 16,000,000 litres) a day – the worst-case scenario BP had offered.
- Construction of a second permanent riser begins.

- June 8

- An Obama interview with Matt Lauer of the Today Show airs with Obama saying he wishes he could fire BP chief Hayward and "I don't sit around just talking to experts because this is a college seminar. We talk to these folks because they potentially have the best answers, so I know whose ass to kick."
- British commentators take Obama to task for taking such harsh rhetoric against Britain's biggest company that paid $14.4 billion in British taxes in 2008 (and $7.2 billion in 2009) with Toby Young noting "what's bad for BP is bad for Britain."
- BP announce it will bring in a floating production, storage and offloading (FPSO) vessel that could then be offloaded with a shuttle tanker (Loch Rannoch which normally services the Schiehallion oilfield) as the processing capacity of collected oil by Discoverer Enterprise (18,000 barrels (760,000 US gallons; 2,900,000 litres) of oil per day) is not sufficient. It also announced that it is setting up a new unit to oversee management of the oil spill and its aftermath, which will be headed by former TNK-BP chief executive Robert Dudley.
- BP releases the requested high resolution images of the leak.
- NOAA Administrator Jane Lubchenco confirms that underwater oil plumes have been discovered at 3,300 feet (1,000 m) about 40 miles (64 km) northeast of the wellhead. She said the plumes discovered by the University of South Florida and measured oil at less than 0.5 parts per million.
- BP announces it will donate net revenue from oil recovered from the spill to create a new wildlife fund to create, restore, improve and protect wildlife habitat along the coastline of Louisiana, Mississippi, Alabama, and Florida. This is over and what it is required under the Oil Pollution Act of 1990. Net revenue consists of the sale of oil minus royalties (18.75%) to the US Government. This only affects BP's 65% ownership share and not Anadarko's or Misui's portion.
- Five of the seven members of the National Academy of Engineering sign a complaint saying they had recommended a 6-month moratorium on drilling in 1,000 feet (300 m) of water and not 500 as was announced.
- Price of a barrel of oil (West Texas Intermediate - Cushing, Oklahoma) $84.34.

- June 9

- BP's chief operating officer Doug Suttles contradicts the underwater plume discussion noting, "It may be down to how you define what a plume is here…The oil that has been found is in very minute quantities."
- BP announces plans to have the well testing vessel Toisa Pisces replace the Discoverer Enterprise for bringing oil to the surface and retrofitting the Q4000 to burn oil in a plan to increase the gathering capabilities from 18,000 to 28,000 barrels (760,000 to 1,180,000 US gallons; 2,900,000 to 4,500,000 litres) a day. The Toisa Pisces will have capabilities of handling 20,000 barrels (840,000 US gallons; 3,200,000 litres) a day while the Q4000 which currently has 5,000 barrels (210,000 US gallons; 790,000 litres) a day capabilities is to be converted to 10,000 barrels (420,000 US gallons; 1,600,000 litres) a day. The tanker Loch Rannoch is to be brought in by June to begin offloading the oil.
- In complying with a request from BP to Twitter parody site BPGlobalPR which has 145,000 follower, the site posts "We are not associated with Beyond Petroleum, the company that has been destroying the Gulf of Mexico for 51 days." The event is covered by the New York Times with the headline, "BP Account on Twitter? Just a Joke; K thx bye." The article also clarifies that BP's Twitter account is bp_america. BP made the request one day after ABC News correspondent Dan Harris interviewed the proprietor.
- The Guardian reports that since April 20, 2010, 27 new offshore drilling projects have been approved by MMS. All but one project was granted similar exemptions from environmental review as BP. Two were submitted by the UK firm, and made the same claims about oil-rig safety and the implausibility of a spill damaging the environment. According to the Centre for Biological Diversity, even after the catastrophe, the Obama administration did not tighten its oversight of offshore drilling. "This oil spill has had absolutely no effect on MMS behaviour at all," said Kieran Suckling, the director of the centre. "It's still business as usual which means rubber stamping oil drilling permits with no environmental review."

- June 10

- Testimony before the United States Senate Committee on Homeland Security and Governmental Affairs indicates there is a not single command and control hierarchy in the cleanup and frequently BP is still taking the lead. Billy Nungesser, president of Plaquemines Parish, Louisiana, said "I still don't know who's in charge. Is it BP? Is it the Coast Guard? I have spent more time fighting the officials of BP and the Coast Guard than fighting the oil."
- Time has an article headlined "The Dirty Dozen: Who to Blame for the Oil Spill" (1. BP former chairman John Browne, current BP president Tony Hayward, 3. MMS official in charge of Gulf drilling Chris Oynes, 4. BP COO Doug Suttles, 5 and 6. Dick Cheney/George W. Bush, 7. The American Driver, 8. Obama, 9. Interior Secretary Ken Salazar, 10. MMS director S. Elizabeth Birnbaum, 11. Transocean CEO Steven Newman, 12. Halliburton executive Tim Probert)
- Waterworld actor Kevin Costner says BP has issued a letter of intent to buy 32 centrifugal oil-water separators from his company Ocean Therapy Solutions. The largest machine (112 inches high, 2-1/2 tons and cleans 210,000 US gallons (790 m^{3}) a day of oily water).
- Senate Democrats send a letter to Hayward asking that a $20 billion escrow account be set up to deal with the spill.
- Nearly 200 lawsuits have been brought against BP.

== June 11–15 ==
- June 11

- Flow Rate Technical Group says the leak could be 20,000 to 40,000 barrels (840,000 to 1,680,000 US gallons; 3,200,000 to 6,400,000 litres) of oil a day. Woods Hole Oceanographic Institution estimates it is 50,000 barrels (2,100,000 US gallons; 7,900,000 litres). The University of Texas at Austin estimate is 22,000 to 30,000 barrels (920,000 to 1,260,000 US gallons; 3,500,000 to 4,800,000 litres) a day. Using the 40,000 level reports indicate it would have spewed 90,100,000 US gallons (2,150,000 barrels) since the accident. By contrast the Exxon Valdez leaked 30,000 barrels (1,300,000 US gallons; 4,800,000 litres) a day. The leak in 53 days is eight times larger.
- Tom Moorman of Ducks Unlimited says 13 million waterfowl will pass through the Gulf starting in August during the migration.
- BP says the relief wells are at 13,978 feet (4,260 m). They need to get to 16,000 to 18,000 feet (4,900 to 5,500 m).
- The Wall Street Journal reports there are 1,728 species of plants and animals including 135 unique creatures and 74 endangered species in the spill area.
- The Fish and Wildlife Report says that of the 473 life birds collected since the spill began 40 have been released. The report also notes that of the 658 dead birds collected only 117 were "visibly oiled."
- BP says it may defer its dividend, putting it into escrow pending an evaluation of its liabilities.
- BP closes the week at $33.97. During the week its stock dropped 16% in one day on June 9 to 29.03 – a 14-year low. Since the spill BP has lost $84 billion in market cap. A JPMorgan analyst anticipates the cost to BP in fines, cleanup costs and litigation will be $29 billion.
- Thad Allen invites BP Chairman Carl-Henric Svanberg to White House meeting with Obama on June 16.
- BP officials say they will expedite payments. Currently BP waits until company books are closed for each month before paying claims.
- Unified Command reports "Low Risk in Near-Term to Florida Peninsula and Keys".

- June 12

- In the light of increase flow estimates Coast Guard rear admiral James A. Watson sends a letter to BP telling them "BP must identify in the next 48 hours additional leak containment capacity that could be operationalised and expedited."
- Obama tells Britain Prime Minister David Cameron the oil spill has "nothing to do with national identity."
- British deputy prime minister Nick Clegg in responding to a question about Obama's rhetoric says "I am not going to start intervening in a debate which clearly risks descending into megaphone diplomacy."
- "Worldwide BP Protest Day" has demonstrations in 50 cities.
- Price of frozen shrimp reported to have jumped 30 percent since spill.
- Pools of crude oil as much as 4 inches deep hit Alabama beaches which previously had only been getting tar balls. State closes Mobile Bay to fishing. Only tarballs are washing up in Florida.
- Doug Suttles in letter dated June 9 but publicized June 12 outlines new plans to increase capacity including addition of the Discoverer Clear Leader which will process 5-10,000 barrels of oil a day using the Kill Line on the blow out preventer through the manifold used in the Top Kill operation. Oil will be stored and offloaded and gas will be flared. The plan will provide capacity of handling 38,000 barrels/day by mid-July. In addition to the previously announced permanent riser to the Toisa Pisces and Loch Rannoch, BP announces plan for a second permanent riser to the Helix Producer with oil offloaded to a yet to be determined tanker. This will increase capacity to 40 to 50,000 barrels a day by mid-July. In addition the Discoverer Enterprise will remain providing 15,000-18,000 in reserve capacity.
- Watson responds in a letter dated June 11 but made public June 12 that the plan does not deal with increased flow estimates and does not offer enough redundancies.
- 5,000 pound tank from the Deepwater Horizon washes ashore in Panama City Beach, Florida.

- June 13

- BP begins installation of sensors into the containment cap to measure the oil flow.
- Obama is scheduling to address the nation on June 15 following his fourth trip to the Gulf since the spill and the day before he will meet with BP executives.

- June 14

- Henry Waxman sends Hayward a letter outlining BP shoddy practices in April leading up to the blowout.
- Suttles in a letter to Watson says a new Floating Production Storage and Offloading from South America will be brought to the site in about 4 weeks. It can handle 25,000 barrels and will provide backup for the Toisa Pisces and the Helix Producer. Two Lightering oil tankers will come from Europe (bringing the total number to three). 3,800 feet (1,200 m) of 6 inch coflexip had been acquired and will provide redundancy in the event of a subsea hose failure or loss. The changes will increase capacity to 60,000 to 80,000 barrels a day by mid July. Suttles however warns "Several hundred people are working in a confined space with live hydrocarbons on up to four vessels...This is significantly beyond both BP and industry practice" and adds that with so many vessels working in a relatively small area there's a risk of a "major surface accident."
- Obama in his fourth visit to the Gulf visits Gulfport, Mississippi where he ate snow cones with Haley Barbour on an oil free beach and said "There's still a lot of opportunity for visitors to come down here -- a lot of beaches that are not yet affected or will not be affected,"
- Obama visits Theodore, Alabama where he says, ""I am confident that we're going to be able to leave the Gulf Coast in better shape than it was before." NOAA and University of New Hampshire Coastal Response Research Center announces a mapping site geoplatform.gov
- 5,000 pound tank from the Deepwater Horizon washes ashore in Miramar Beach, Florida
- Keith P. Ellison rules that liability cases filed against Transocean can move forward under the Clean Water Act and Clean Air Act; and that the Limitation of Liability Act of 1851 does not apply (Transocean had sought to cap its liability at $27 million for the value of its contracts on the Deepwater Enterprise).

- June 15

- Competing oil executives testifying before the House Energy and Commerce Committee imply in their testimony that they have stronger safeguards than BP in drilling. Rex W. Tillerson, chairman of ExxonMobil, testifies that if companies follow proper well design, drilling, maintenance and training procedures accidents like Deepwater Horizon explosion on April 20 "should not occur". John S. Watson, chief executive of Chevron, testifies that every Chevron employee and contractor has the authority to stop work immediately if they see anything unsafe. Other executives testifying are Shell and Conoco Phillips.
- Edward J. Markey takes the oil companies to task, noting that their submitted plans for dealing with disasters in the Gulf were nearly identical to BP's including a plan to protect the walrus which does not occur in the Gulf.
- Energy Committee Representative Joseph Cao from Louisiana tells the executives "Well, in the Asian culture, we do things differently. During the samurai days, we'd just give you the knife and ask you to commit hara-kiri…My constituents are still debating on what they want me to ask you to do."
- Fitch downgrades BP Bond credit rating six notches to BBB status.
- Lightning hits the derrick on the Discoverer Enterprise creating a small fire which is extinguished. The drillship temporarily suspends its collection activities.
- Flow Rate Technical Group places the flow at 35,000 to 60,000 barrels per day.
- Obama visits Pensacola, Florida where bathers are photographed on the beach in the background during the tour. He gives a speech at the Naval Air Station Pensacola. Obama in the first speech from the Oval Office of his presidency gives attorney Michael R. Bromwich power to clean up the MMS.
- Obama appoints Ray Mabus to develop a long-term restoration plan for the Gulf Coast.
- Unified Command announces plans to move its 350 staff into 38,224 square feet (3,551.1 m^{2}) of space to downtown New Orleans, Louisiana near the Superdome at 1250 Poydras Plaza (the Eni Building).
- NOAA and Coast Guard report seizing 19,000 pounds of shrimp caught in a closed fishing area 13 miles (21 km) south of Belle Pass, Louisiana.
- Obama signs amendment authorizing the Coast Guard to obtain multiple advances (up to $100 million each), with the total amount of all advances not to exceed the incident cap under current law ($1 billion), from the Oil Spill Liability Trust Fund. The Fund is principally funded by a 5-cent-per-barrel tax, collected from the oil industry on petroleum produced in or imported to the United States.
- Transocean in its monthly fleet report notes that some of its customers are seeking to declare force majeure to nullify their contracts as a result of the moratorium noting that the rigs could be moved or used for other non-drilling activities. In particular it says it has rejected Anadarko's claims.
- Anadarko CEO James T. Hackett declines to testify before Senate Committee citing scheduling conflicts. Huffington Post reports he is scheduled in the Houston on to receive "Oil and Gas Investor's Executive of the Year" award. Yoshiyuki Kagawa, president and CEO of Mitsui Oil Exploration Co. also declines because of scheduling issues.

== June 16–20 ==
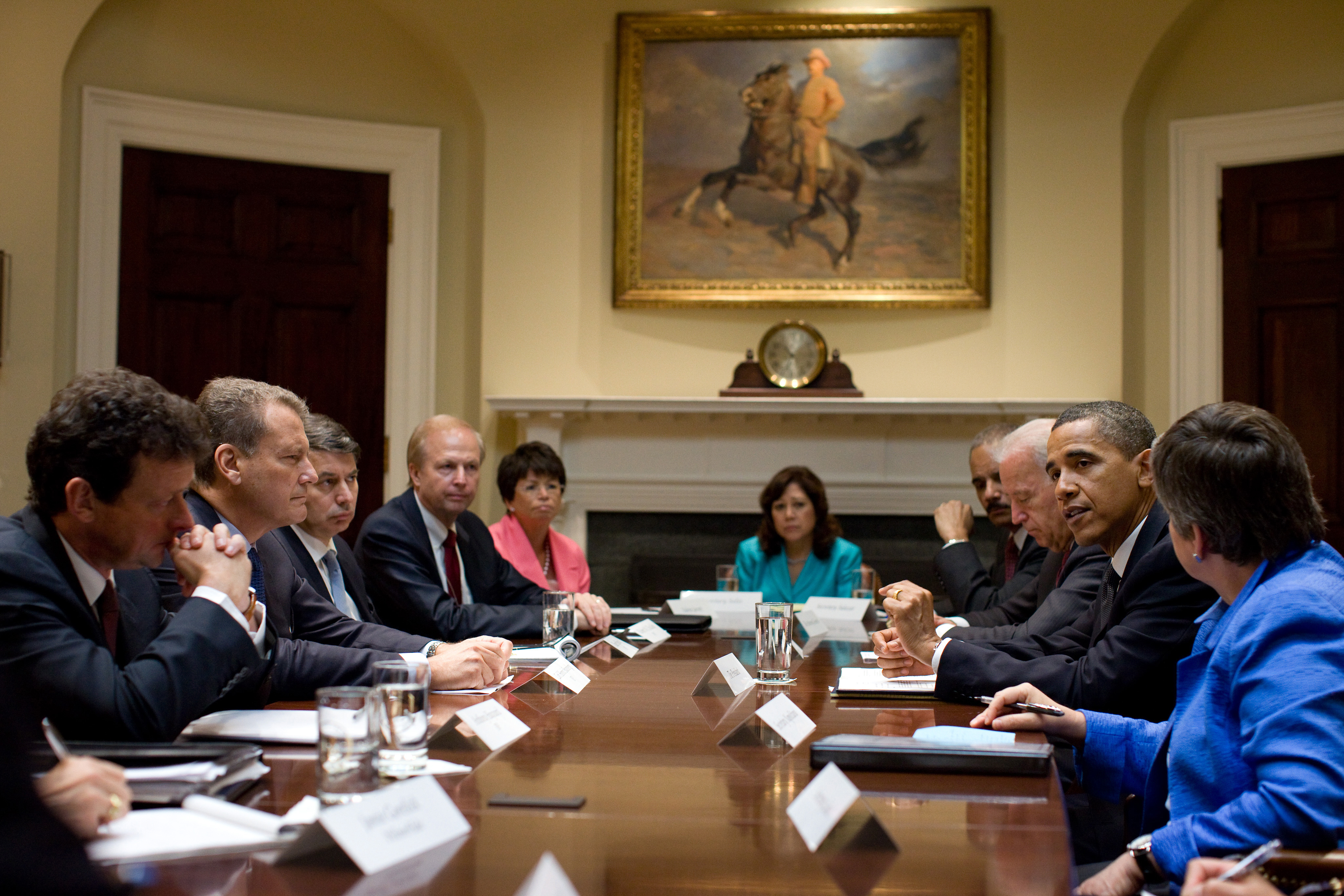
Obama and Vice President Joe Biden meet with BP executives in the Roosevelt Room of the White House, June 16, 2010, Pictured, from left, are BP CEO Tony Hayward, BP Chairman Carl-Henric Svanberg, BP General Counsel Rupert Bondy, BP Managing Director Robert Dudley, Senior Advisor Valerie Jarrett, Labor Secretary Hilda Solis, Attorney General Eric Holder, and Homeland Security Secretary Janet Napolitano.

- June 16

- Obama meets with Svanberg, Hayward, McKay. BP agrees to fund a $20 billion escrow account administered by Kenneth Feinberg.
- Svanberg said no BP quarterly dividends would be paid anytime in 2010.
- BP will pay $5 billion a year into the fund. Reconfigured Q4000 is put back in service collecting oil.
- Transocean's Newman testifying before the United States Senate Homeland Security Permanent Subcommittee on Investigations that the company is not legally responsible for "fluids emanating from the well."
- Good weather has resulted in several controlled burns. Since the spill 210 burns have been conducted to remove a total of 5,200,000 US gallons (20,000 m^{3}).
- NOAA ship Pisces reports the finding of a dead sperm whale 77 miles (120 km) due south of the spill. Great Lakes Dredge and Dock Company under the Shaw Environmental and Infrastructure Group begin constructing sand berms off the Louisiana coast to limit the amount of approaching oil in the Gulf of Mexico.
- Louisiana State Senate unanimously approves Senate Resolution 145 to declare June 20 "Statewide Day of Prayer" where "citizens are urged to pray for a solution to this crisis." Robert Adley who sponsored the bill says in a press release, "Thus far the efforts made by mortals to try to solve the crisis have been to no avail. It is clearly time for a miracle for us"

- June 17

- Hayward addresses the United States House Energy Subcommittee on Oversight and Investigations. In Hayward's prepared remarks he says, "I want to speak directly to the people who live and work in the Gulf region: I know that this incident has had a profound impact on your lives and caused great turmoil, and I deeply regret that."
- Texas Republican Joe Barton tells Hayward "I'm ashamed of what happened in the White House yesterday…a tragedy of the first proportion, that a private corporation can be subjected to what I would characterize as a shakedown, a $20 billion shakedown."
- Vandals slice up a 600-foot (180 m) chunk oil boom at Garcon Point in Pensacola.
- The Coast Guard releases a public service announcement against vandalism of the booms. Coast Guard approves return of vacuum barges which had been temporarily removed so the Coast Guard could complete inspections and certifications. The barges had been deployed to Barataria Bay and around Bay Jimmy and East Grand Terre.
- Anadarko Petroleum says it will make a $45 million dividend payment to shareholders in the next week.
- Anadarko says it is reviewing a bill (for undisclosed amount) it received from BP.
- Allen says the relief well Development Driller III is about three to four weeks away from hitting the actual well bore to begin the "bottom kill" tactic of pumping drilling mud into the well. Development Driller III is at 9,967 feet (3,038 m) below the sea floor. The backup relief well Driller II is at 4,500 feet (1,400 m). Asked if the relief wells would stop the flow in mid-July, Allen said that the last portion of the process is very complex and that it could take longer, citing the target date of mid-August.
- Allen says they do not the extent of the damage to the well bore or if the well bore has been compromised adding "that's the reason we didn't go, didn't go to excessive pressures on the top kill and decided that we'd deal with containment and then go for the final relief well." Florida Incident Command Center moves from St. Petersburg, Florida to Miami, Florida. Discoverer Enterprise begins transferring oil to the tanker Overseas Cascade which will deliver it to Mobile, Alabama.

- June 18

- Svanberg tells Sky News that BP Managing Director and Mississippi native Robert Dudley will replace Hayward as BP manager of the spill.
- Shipping company Dockwise says it will send Mighty Servant 3 to collect oil-saturated solid material and oily water.
- Moody's lowers Anadarko ratings to junk bond status. Andarko's CEO Jim Hackett releases a statement saying that "The mounting evidence clearly demonstrates that this tragedy was preventable and the direct result of BP's reckless decisions and actions."

- June 19

- BP issues clarifications on whether Hayward or Dudley is in charge of the spill. BP spokesman Robert Wine says "Until the leak is capped, Tony Hayward is still very much in charge in the response of this crisis."
- Hayward attends the Round the Island Race where his yacht "Bob" finishes fourth place. The appearance is portrayed in the press and by public officials as a gaffe. Fox News headlines its article "BP Chief Yachts While Gulf Oil Spill Burns". The Christian Science Monitor headlines its article, "A yachting trip? The 10 worst BP gaffes in Gulf oil spill." The Guardian headline is "BP chief's weekend sailing trip stokes anger at oil company". Rahm Emanuel says "Well, to quote Tony Hayward, he has got his life back...and I think we can all conclude that Tony Hayward is not going to have a second career in PR consulting. This has just been part of a long line of PR gaffes and mistakes."

- June 20

- Sunday Times reports BP is raising $50 billion to cover the spill costs ($10 billion from a bond sale, $20 billion from banks and $20 billion from asset sales over two years).
- Markey releases an internal BP undated document that states "If BOP and wellhead are removed and if we have incorrectly modeled the restrictions – the rate could be as high as ~ 100,000 barrels per day up the casing or 55,000 barrels per day up the annulus (low probability worst cases)".
- BP spokesman Wine emphasized that the document which was presented to investigators in May established the worst-case scenario based on the removal of the BOP. "The blowout preventer is being kept in place and is not being moved until we can guarantee to the authorities and the public at large that the well is being killed and poses no threat," Wine says.

== June 21–25 ==
- June 21

- Hayward, citing his busy schedule, cancels a keynote speech on "Key Roles and Responsibilities of International Oil Companies in an Age of Economic Uncertainty" that was to be delivered to the "World National Oil Companies Congress."
- BP Spokesman Sheila Williams issues another clarification on who's in charge of the spill at BP. "The transition of day-to-day handling by BP Managing Director Robert Dudley of the oil spill cleanup has started," she says.
- BBC airs documentary in which Tyrone Benton, a robot operator, says the robot cameras on the Deepwater Horizon spotted a leak in early April two weeks before the accident in a control pod on the BOP. The leaking BOP pod was turned off and another one turned on. The BOP was not taken out of service after the report. BP spokesman Williams said the matter was being investigated saying, "Transocean was responsible for both the operation and maintenance of the BOP on the drilling rig." New policy says collection will be suspended when lightning is within five miles (8 km) of the Discoverer Enterprise.

- June 22

- Martin Leach-Cross Feldman of the United States District Court for the Eastern District of Louisiana issues restraining order in Hornbeck Offshore Services LLC v. Salazar against the 6-month moratorium on drilling in the Gulf waters of 500 feet (150 m) or more. Feldman in his ruling says Interior Department failed to provide adequate reasoning and that the moratorium seems to assume that because one rig failed, all companies and rigs doing deepwater drilling pose an imminent danger. The White House says it will appeal. The decision noted about among other things that the moratorium was factually misleading because the moratorium stated it was based on recommendations "peer-reviewed by seven experts" although five of the National Academy experts had "publicly stated that they do not agree with the six month blanket moratorium." Salazar is reported to preparing a new moratorium.
- 25,836 barrels are recovered in the last 24 hours - the most since the spill. A 40-foot (12 m) section of the riser that was cut for the current cap is brought to the surface for forensic purposes.
- Allen says that if the relief wells fail oil and natural gas could be piped from the well to facilities nearby where they would be processed and pumped back into a reservoir.
- BP says net revenue it receives from the sale of oil recovered from the MC252 spill will go to the National Fish and Wildlife Foundation.
- Feinberg tells Neil Cavutto of Fox," If BP ever were - - was unable to pay valid claims because of bankruptcy, that would be a disaster for the — for BP, it would be a disaster for the people in the Gulf, it would be a disaster for the economy of the Gulf. I think that is not an option...And I must say, to those who criticize this fund as somehow driving BP toward the brink, I would only add that this fund is — is, in one sense, a very important lifesaver for BP. Claims should not into this facility. The alternative is to litigate against BP in court for a decade or more. You don't know if you're going to prevail. You've got to give your lawyer 40 or 40 percent contingency."
- Texas A&M University oceanography professor John Kessler reports that methane within five miles (8 km) of the spill is 100,000 times higher than normal. "We saw them approach a million times above background concentrations" in some areas, he says

- June 23

- New York Daily News says that Judge Feldman who overturned the moratorium reported owning $15,000 in shares of Transocean Ltd. stock in 2008 and also owned stock in Halliburton.
- BP removes the containment cap on the blowout preventer after an undersea robot collides with it. The operation halts oil flow to the Discoverer Enterprise. Oil is still being sent to the Q4000. Allen says if there are no gas hydrates in the pipe connecting to it, it will quickly be installed. If there are hydrates "the will take a considerable amount longer" because the pipe connecting to the Horizon will have to be reinserted. The cap was removed at approximately 8:45 AM CDT and was reattached at 6:30 PM CDT.
- House Republican Leader John Boehner says Joe Barton will keep his job as ranking Republican on the Energy Committee following multiple Barton apologies for his comments about BP being shaken down
- WTVT reports that boat captain Mike Ellis video on YouTube says turtles including the endangered species Kemp's ridley turtles are being burned alive when they are caught in controlled burns in which booms ring the burn and the turtles can not get out.
- BP officials names Dudley President and Chief Executive Officer of BP's newly created Gulf Coast Restoration Organization which "will manage all aspects of the response to the Deepwater Horizon incident" Dudley will report to Hayward.
- 62 rehabilitated brown pelicans and one rehabilitated northern gannet are released at the Aransas National Wildlife Refuge.
- NOAA opens 8,000 square miles (21,000 km^{2}) of the Gulf to fishing 78,597 square miles (203,600 km^{2}) —approximately 32.5 percent of federal areas in the Gulf are still closed.
- Allen "Rookie" Kruse of Orange Beach, Alabama, a captain of a vessel of opportunity charter boat being used in the cleanup is found dead in a suicide on one of his boats. Reports indicate "witnesses told investigators that Kruse was upset by the loss of business caused by fishing grounds being closed due to the spill and with the public perceptions of the spill."
- Fast Company reports BP has rejected 908 from the Innocentive website asking people to submit their solutions by June 30.
- House Judiciary Committee approves H.R. 5503, Securing Protections for the Injured from Limitations on Liability Act (SPILL Act) sponsored by John Conyers and Charlie Melancon. Among the provisions are repeal of limitations and responsible parties from using the bankruptcy courts as a subterfuge to leave victims without adequate legal recourse.

- June 24

- Donald Vidrine, BP site leader aboard the Deepwater Horizon, confirms he has been on administrative leave since the incident.
- Pensacola Beach closed for the first time. Health advisories are posted are 33 miles (53 km) of Florida Panhandle beaches.
- Feldman refuses to stay his order. He also said that he would release his financial information "as soon as their security protocol on the release of (the report) has been satisfied."
- The Christian Science Monitor, in an article headlined "Raining oil in Louisiana? Video suggests Gulf oil spill causing crude rain", reports on an amateur video which is reported to show it raining oil in Louisiana. It notes that speculation that use of the Corexit 9500 dispesant has made this possible. It quotes the EPA saying it "has no data, information or scientific basis that suggests that oil mixed with dispersant could possibly evaporate from the Gulf into the water cycle." Fast Company in an article headlined, "Raining Oil in Louisiana? Not Likely" tried to discount the claim but then adds that a memo on the MMS site says lighter crude oils can evaporate. The linked 1994 article on MMS says, "light crudes can evaporate 75% of the starting oil mass."
- The New York Times reports 272,000 US gallons (1,000 m^{3}) of dispersants have been applied in the four weeks since the EPA banned their surface use May 26. In addition has used 342,000 US gallons (1,300 m^{3}) sub-surface.
- New York Times in an article headlined "BP Is Pursuing Alaska Drilling Some Call Risky" says BP has gotten permission to get around offshore rules by building an "onshore" well which is to be built at Endicott, Alaska on an artificial sandbar of 31 acres (130,000 m^{2}) and code named "Liberty." The well would go two miles (3 km) below the surface and then up to 8 miles (13 km) horizontally under the water to the oil reservoir.

- June 25

- With the first tropical depression of the season forming in the Gulf Allen outlines the downtime when a storm hits—in which the vessels disconnect from the oil recovery and drilling operations (114 to 120 hours before gale-force winds (40-knots) are forecasted). During this time the full amount of oil would go into the Gulf.
- Senator Nelson noting the times coupled with reconnecting says that a storm could cause oil to go unchecked into the Gulf for 10 days. Feldman's released financial statement shows he "owned shares in at least 17 oil and gas companies last year, including an unspecified interest in Transocean Ltd." in 2009.
- The Wall Street Journal reports he sold shares of Exxon, one of the parties in the moratorium case, on June 22 before hearing the case. The Journal reports that he had sold Transocean prior to the case and that he did not own stock in any of the companies affected directly by the moratorium.
- BP stock closes at $26.96—down 53% since April 20.
- Suttles tells the New Orleans Times-Picayune, "The flow rate has never impacted the response," adding it is "extraordinarily imprecise and we took a view very early on that we didn't think you could do it and we didn't think it was relevant either."

== June 26–30 ==
- June 26

- The tropical depression becomes Tropical Storm Alex. The initial forecast track indicates it will not directly go over the spill.
- Allen in his daily briefing notes that the time to resume operations once the ships returned would be 38 hours for Discover Enterprise, 72 hours for the Development Driller 2, 72 hours for Development Driller 3, and 90 hours for the Q4000.
- Obama and David Cameron meeting at the 2010 G-20 Toronto summit in Toronto, Ontario, Canada. Reuters quoting a "British official" says, "Both agreed that there was nothing to be gained from damaging BP as a going concern...Both agreed that BP must meet its obligations to cap the leak, clean up the damage and meet legitimate compensation costs."
- BP has finished installing the first free standing riser which will be used when a third vessel (most likely the Helix Producer) starts collecting and processing oil.

- June 27

- Alex is downgraded to a tropical depression while crossing Yucatan and then elevated to a tropical storm once it hits the Gulf. BP and Shell are among the companies that evacuate personnel from their rigs in the western Gulf.
- G20 Toronto Summit Declaration says, "Following the recent oil spill in the Gulf of Mexico we recognize the need to share best practices to protect the marine environment, prevent accidents related to offshore exploration and development, as well as transportation, and deal with their consequences."
- Unified Command issues press release headlined, "Volunteers, agencies counter misinformation about oil spill" which quotes Bianca Ephraim, a receptionist at the National Park Service who takes calls about oil in Florida saying, ""Yes, there are tar balls here and there...But our water is clear as glass." Harv Wilson, identified as a contractor in the release, flatly dismisses a rumor that oil-coated birds were being stolen from beaches at night, in order to hide the evidence of the spill.
- Tar balls wash ashore on the Mississippi beaches of St. Andrews beach and at the Lake Mars pier in Gulf Park Estates, Mississippi.

- June 28

- BP says it is spending $100 million a day on the spill. BP denies a report attributed to Russian Deputy Prime Minister Igor Sechin on RIA Novosti that Hayward is going to resign. Sechinto made the comments before meeting Hayward to discuss TNK-BP which is responsible for a quarter of BP's global oil output.
- After the meeting both sides said the leadership change was not discussed.
- BP Senior Vice President Kent Wells says that waves of 10 to 12 feet (3.7 m) which is possible even if Alex skirts the spill area could delay connecting the riser to Helix Producer I to begin a third relief vessel. Wells says it will take three days of good weather to complete the operation.
- Allen says that even though Development Driller III is within 1,000 feet (300 m) of the Deepwater Horizon wellbore and has begun ranging, it would probably take until the end of August before the bottom kill operation would be complete.
- Louisiana Department of Health and Hospitals Secretary Alan Levine sends Suttles a letter for $10 million to fund six months of mental health services for people affected by the spill. Levine wrote, "There exists anger, anxiety and uncertainty among the families and communities affected by the spill, which will easily manifest into addiction and various forms of mental health crisis if not confronted."
- Bill Clinton suggests to CNN that the Navy should use explosives to end the spill.

- June 29

- Simon Boxall of the National Oceanography Centre reporting on lessons learned from Exxon Valdez says that the massive burns and use of chemical dispersants may have done more damage than letting the oil take its natural course in that light crude disintegrates relatively easily. He says, "The chemically cleaned up areas have taken the longest to recover and they are still damaged…The areas that were left alone actually recovered much quicker."
- BP spokesman Scott Dean tells the Associated Press that the company is giving incentives to franchise stations that includes volume allowances and reductions in credit card fees that merchants pay when customers use their credit cards to buy gasoline and items in station stores. Some BP branded stations say they have had a 10 percent to 40 percent decline in business since the spill. Alex upgrade to hurricane status (Category 1) about 10 PM CDT.

- June 30

- Mark Proegler spokesman for BP says Hurricane Alex will delay the arrival of Helix Producer until July 6 or 7.
- Anadarko was informed of well design, changes to the well design, and identified major well control including the long string and the use of centralisers that have been discussed as a possible cause of the failure. John Christiansen, Anadarko's spokesman, says "What we knew was that the design, the long string and the use of centralisers all met industry standards if executed correctly." BP shares jumped 1.8% after a JPMorgan analyst suggested the possibility of a BP buyout by Exxon or Shell.
- Allen who was succeeded on May 24 by Robert Papp as Coast Guard Commandant officially retires from Coast Guard but will remain as National Incident Commander.
- EPA releases study of oil dispersants. "EPA's results indicated that none of the eight dispersants tested, including the product in use in the Gulf, displayed biologically significant endocrine disrupting activity. While the dispersant products alone – not mixed with oil - have roughly the same impact on aquatic life, JD-2000 and Corexit 9500 were generally less toxic to small fish and JD-2000 and SAF-RON GOLD were least toxic to mysid shrimp," the report says.
- Allen reports wave height at the wellhead from Hurricane Alex is seven feet. Allen reports 107 offers of foreign assistance from 44 countries and four international organizations.
- A 20-meter safety zone is placed around all booms. Violations have a civil fine of $40,000 and willful violations are a Class felony.
