= Deepwater Horizon explosion =

2010 oil disaster in the Gulf of Mexico

- Anchor handling tugs and platform supply vessels combat the fire on the Deepwater Horizon while the United States Coast Guard searches for missing crew.
- Date: April 20, 2010; 16 years ago
- Time: 9:56 p.m. (UTC-6)
- Location: Gulf of Mexico, Louisiana, U.S.; 28°44′12″N 88°23′14″W
- Deaths: 11 (presumed)
- Injuries: 17
- Crew: 126

On April 20, 2010, an explosion and fire occurred on the Deepwater Horizon semi-submersible mobile offshore drilling unit, which was owned and operated by Transocean and drilling for BP in the Macondo Prospect oil field about 40 miles (64 km) southeast off the Louisiana coast. The explosion and subsequent fire resulted in the sinking of the Deepwater Horizon and the deaths of 11 workers; 17 others were injured. The same blowout that caused the explosion also caused an oil well fire and a massive offshore oil spill in the Gulf of Mexico, considered the largest accidental marine oil spill of all time, and the largest environmental disaster in United States history.

== Background ==
=== Deepwater Horizon ===
Location of the Deepwater Horizon on April 20, 2010

Deepwater Horizon was a floating semi-submersible drilling unit—a fifth-generation, ultra-deepwater, dynamically positioned, column-stabilized drilling rig owned by Transocean and built in South Korea. The platform was 396 feet (121 m) long and 256 feet (78 m) wide and could operate in waters up to 8,000 feet (2,400 m) deep, to a maximum drill depth of 30,000 feet (9,100 m). Press releases from Transocean state the platform had historically been used for deeper wells, including the deepest underwater gas and oil well. The $560 million platform was built by Hyundai Heavy Industries in South Korea and completed in 2001. It was owned by Transocean, operated under the Marshallese flag of convenience, and was under lease to BP until September 2013. At the time of the explosion, the Deepwater Horizon was on Mississippi Canyon Block 252, referred to as the Macondo Prospect, in the United States sector of the Gulf of Mexico, about 41 miles (66 km) off the Louisiana coast. In March 2008, the mineral rights to drill for oil on the Macondo Prospect were purchased by BP at the Minerals Management Service's lease sale. The platform commenced drilling in February 2010 at a water depth of approximately 5,000 feet (1,500 m). At the time of the explosion the rig was drilling an exploratory well. The planned well was to be drilled to 18,360 feet (5,600 m) below sea level, and was to be plugged and suspended for subsequent completion as a subsea producer. Production casing was being run and cemented at the time of the accident. Once the cementing was complete, it was due to be tested for integrity and a cement plug set to temporarily abandon the well.

=== Transocean safety record ===
The rig owner, Transocean, had a "strong overall" safety record with no major incidents for 7 years. However, a Wall Street Journal analysis "painted a more equivocal picture" with Transocean rigs being disproportionately responsible for safety related incidents in the Gulf and industry surveys reporting concerns over falling quality and performance. Between 2005 and 2007, Transocean was the owner of 30% of oil rigs active in the Gulf, and 33% of the incidents that triggered a Minerals Management Service (MMS) investigation took place on Transocean rigs. However, in the 3 years from 2008 to February 15, 2010, Transocean was the owner of 42% of rigs active in the Gulf but was responsible for 73% of incidents. Industry surveys saw this as an effect of its November 2007 merger with rival GlobalSantaFe. Transocean was described as having had previous problems with both cement seals (in 2005) and blowout preventers (in 2006), both the suspected cause of the Deepwater Horizon disaster; however, the company stated that cementing was a task completed by third party laborers, and that it had "a strong maintenance program to keep blowout preventers working". According to the Wall Street Journal online:

In 2008 and 2009, the surveys ranked Transocean last among deep-water drillers for "job quality" and second to last in 'overall satisfaction'. For three years before the merger, Transocean was the leader or near the top in both measures. Transocean ranked first in 2008 and 2009 in a category that gauges its in-house safety and environmental policies. There were few indications of any trouble with the Deepwater Horizon before the explosion. The rig won an award from the MMS for its 2008 safety record, and on the day of the disaster, BP and Transocean managers were on board to celebrate seven years without a lost-time accident. A BP spokesman said rigs hired by BP have had better safety records than the industry average for six years running, according to MMS statistics that measure the number of citations per inspection. BP has been a finalist for a national safety award from the MMS for the past two years. [BP spokesperson Toby Odone] wouldn't comment on BP's relationship with Transocean after the Gulf disaster but said BP continues to use Transocean rigs.

=== Pre-explosion risks and precautions ===
Deepwater Horizon drilling rig before the explosion

In February 2009, BP filed a 52-page exploration and environmental impact plan for the Macondo well with the Minerals Management Service (MMS), an arm of the United States Department of the Interior that oversees offshore drilling. The plan stated that it was "unlikely that an accidental surface or subsurface oil spill would occur from the proposed activities". In the event an accident did take place, the plan stated that due to the well being 48 miles (77 km) from shore and the response capabilities that would be implemented, no significant adverse impacts would be expected. The Department of the Interior exempted BP's Gulf of Mexico drilling operation from a detailed environmental impact study after concluding that a massive oil spill was unlikely. In addition, following a loosening of regulations in 2008, BP was not required to file a detailed blowout plan.

The BP wellhead had been fitted with a blowout preventer (BOP), but it was not fitted with remote-control or acoustically activated triggers for use in case of an emergency requiring a platform to be evacuated. It did have a dead man's switch designed to automatically cut the pipe and seal the well if communication from the platform is lost, but it was unknown whether the switch was activated. Documents discussed during congressional hearings June 17, 2010, indicated that Transocean previously made modifications to the BOP for the Macondo site which increased the risk of BOP failure, in spite of warnings from their contractor to that effect. Regulators in both Norway and Brazil generally require acoustically activated triggers on all offshore platforms, but when the Minerals Management Service considered requiring the remote device, a report commissioned by the agency as well as drilling companies questioned its cost and effectiveness. In 2003, the agency determined that the device would not be required because drilling rigs had other back-up systems to cut off a well.

=== Pre-explosion problems and warnings ===
The US Coast Guard had issued pollution citations for Deepwater Horizon 18 times between 2000 and 2010 and had investigated 16 fires and other incidents. These incidents were considered typical for a Gulf platform and were not connected to the April 2010 explosion and spill. The Deepwater Horizon had other serious incidents, including one in 2008 in which 77 people were evacuated from the platform when it tilted and began to sink after a section of pipe was incorrectly removed from the platform's ballast system.

The American Bureau of Shipping last inspected the rig's failed blowout preventer in 2005.

Internal BP documents show that BP engineers had concerns as early as 2009 that the metal casing that BP wanted to use might collapse under high pressure. According to a number of rig workers, it was understood that workers could get fired for raising safety concerns that might delay drilling. David Rainey, BP Gulf of Mexico Exploration Manager, was putting his staff and the drilling department under extreme pressure to finish the Macondo well and to move the rig to the next exploration prospect. Rainey was angry that the MC 252 well was over budget and needed to be finished. Gulf of Mexico engineers were not satisfied that they had a proper leak off test and had concerns as to cement integrity. Rainey pressured them to complete the well; no cement bond log was run. The technical staff wanted to re-squeeze the well, but Rainey would not accept this recommendation.

In March 2010, the rig experienced problems that included drilling mud falling into the undersea oil formation, sudden gas releases, a pipe falling into the well, and at least three occasions of the blowout preventer leaking fluid. The rig's mechanic stated that the well had been experiencing problems for months, and that the drill repeatedly kicked due to resistance from high gas pressure. On March 10, a BP executive emailed the Minerals Management Service about a stuck pipe and well control situation at the drilling site, and stated that BP would have to plugback the well. A confidential survey commissioned by Transocean weeks before the explosion stated that workers were concerned about safety practices and feared reprisals if they reported mistakes or other problems. The survey raised concerns "about poor equipment reliability, which they believed was a result of drilling priorities taking precedence over maintenance." The survey found that "many workers entered fake data to try to circumvent the system. As a result, the company's perception of safety on the rig was distorted".

The blowout preventer was damaged in a previously unreported accident in late March. According to Transocean, workers had been performing standard routines and had no indication of any problems prior to the explosion.

By April 20, the operation was running five weeks late.

An April draft of a BP memo warned that the cementing of the casing was unlikely to be successful. Halliburton has said that it had finished cementing 20 hours before the blowout but had not yet set the final cement plug. A nitrogen-foamed cement was used which is more difficult to handle than standard cement.

Patrick O'Bryan, BP Vice President of drilling, was on the platform two hours prior to the explosion to celebrate seven years without a "lost-time incident" with the rig's crew. A BP official on board the rig directed the crew to replace the drilling mud with lighter seawater even though the rig's chief driller protested.

Preliminary findings from BP's internal investigation indicated several serious warning signs in the hours prior to the blowout. Equipment readings indicated gas bubbling into the well, which could signal an impending blowout. The heavy drilling mud in the pipes initially held down the gas. A House Energy and Commerce Committee statement in June 2010 noted that in a number of cases leading up to the explosion, BP appears to have chosen riskier procedures to save time or money, sometimes against the advice of its staff or contractors.

An article released by The Guardian in 2010, the year of the explosion, reported that the accident could have been avoided had BP implemented better management and communication.

== Blowout ==
Supply boats continued to battle the fire, viewed from a Coast Guard helicopter

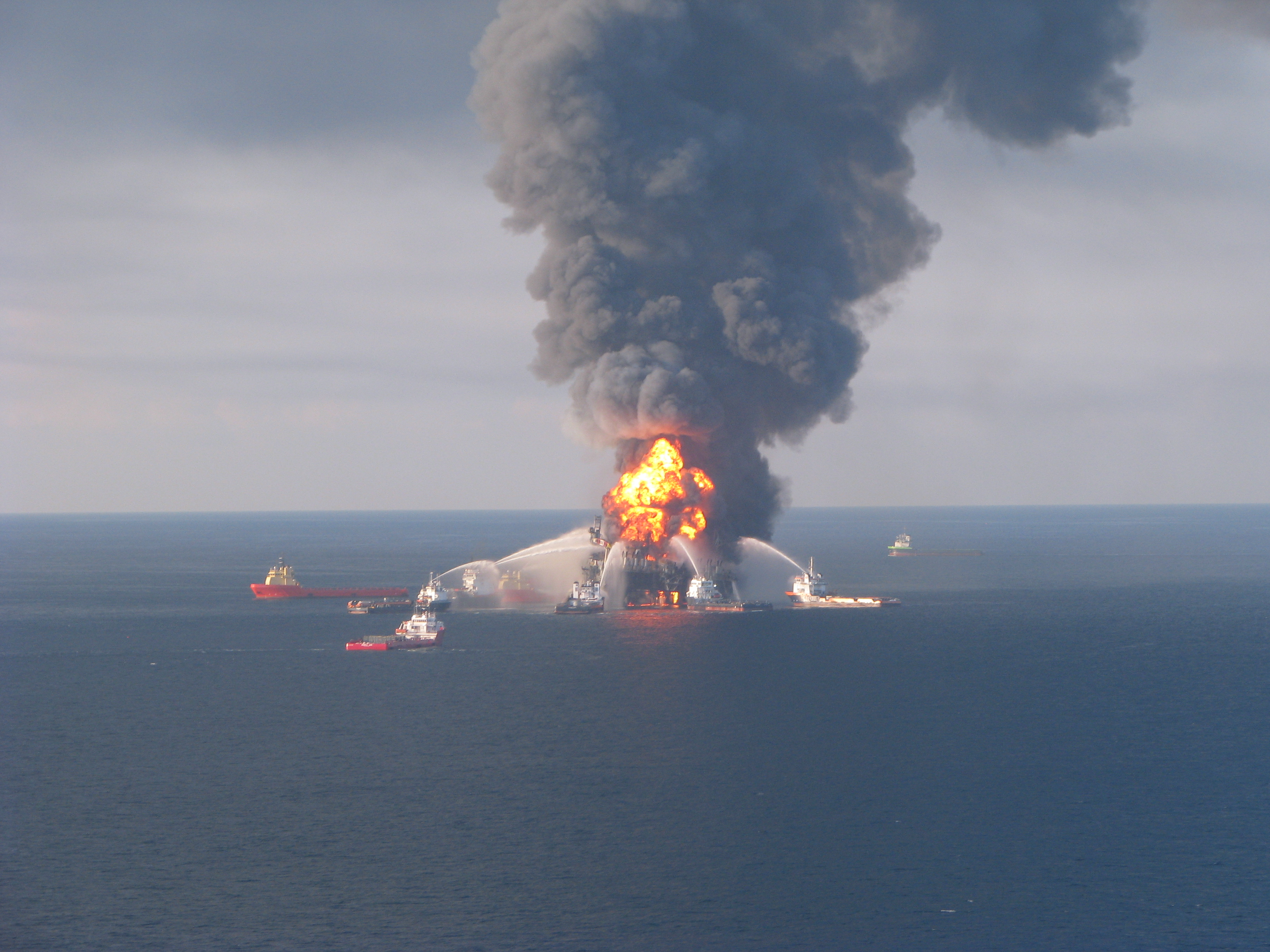
Deepwater Horizon on fire as supply boats approach her.

The fire aboard the Deepwater Horizon reportedly started at 9:56 p.m. CDT on April 20.

Transocean employees on the vessel stated that the electric lights flickered, followed by two strong vibrations. Jim Ingram stated that "on the second [thud], we knew something was wrong." After the explosion, Adrian Rose stated that abnormal pressure had accumulated inside the marine riser and as it came up it "expanded rapidly and ignited." According to BP's internal investigation, a bubble of methane gas escaped from the well and shot up the drill column, expanding quickly as it burst through several seals and barriers before exploding. Rose said the event was basically a blowout. Survivors described the incident as a sudden explosion that gave them less than five minutes to escape as the alarm went off.

The explosion was followed by a fire that engulfed the platform. After burning for more than a day, Deepwater Horizon sank on April 22. The Coast Guard stated on April 22 that it received word of the sinking at approximately 10:21 am.

On Sept. 8, BP published a report that suggested that the ignition source was the released gas entering the air intakes of the diesel generators, and engulfing the deck area where the exhaust outlets for the main generators were emitting hot exhaust gas.

== Casualties and rescue efforts ==
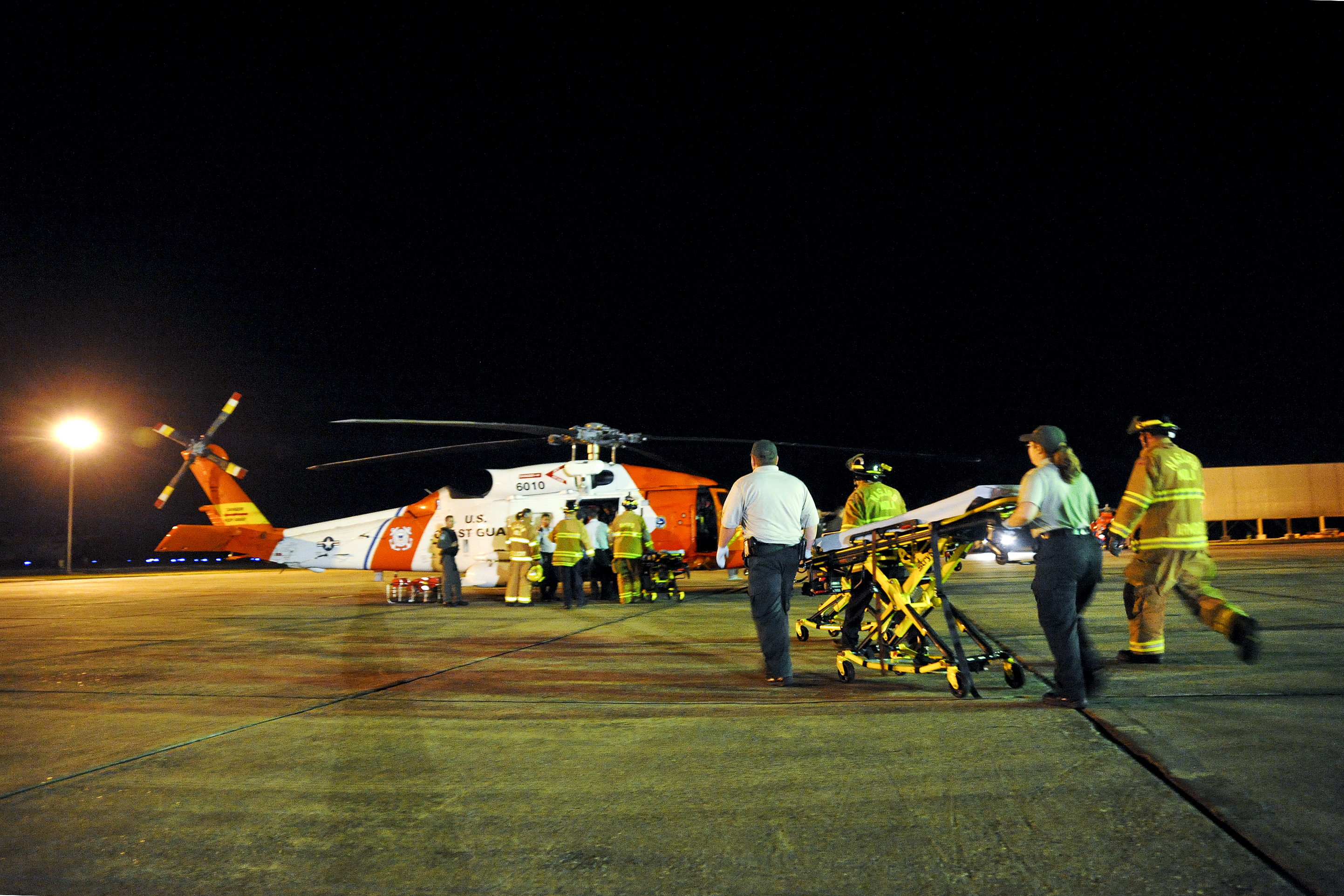
A helicopter crew medevac survivors from Deepwater Horizon after the explosion.

=== Survivors ===
According to officials, 126 people were on board, of whom 79 were Transocean employees, seven were from BP, and 40 were contracted; several of the BP and Transocean executives were on board for a tour of the rig, maintenance planning, annual goals review, a "Drops" safety campaign, and to congratulate the senior staff of the rig for 7 years of operations without a lost time incident.

A total of 115 people were evacuated. Lifeboats took 94 workers to the Tidewater-owned supply boat Damon Bankston, with no major injuries, four were transported to another vessel, and 17 were evacuated by helicopter to trauma centers in Mobile, Alabama, and Marrero, Louisiana. Most were soon released.

The Coast Guard interviewed the uninjured workers on the Damon Bankston for several hours and then transferred them to another rig; the workers arrived in Port Fourchon, Louisiana, more than 24 hours later. The workers were transported to a hotel in Kenner, Louisiana, where they were provided with food, medical attention, and rooms with showers, and asked to fill out incident response forms. An attorney for a worker who brought suit against Transocean claimed that once the workers got to shore, "they were zipped into private buses, there was security there, there was no press, no lawyers allowed, nothing, no family members" and were coerced into signing the forms before being released; Transocean denied the allegation.

=== Casualties ===
Initial reports indicated that between 12 and 15 workers were missing; reports soon narrowed the number of missing to nine crew members on the platform floor and two engineers. The United States Coast Guard immediately launched a rescue operation involving two Coast Guard cutters, four helicopters, and a rescue plane. The two cutters continued searching through the night and by the morning of April 22, the Coast Guard had surveyed nearly 1,940 square miles (5,000 km^{2}). On April 23, the Coast Guard called off the search for the 11 missing persons, concluding that "reasonable expectations of survival" had passed. Officials concluded that the missing workers may have been near the blast and unable to escape the sudden explosion. A memorial service was held in May for the 11 workers deemed to have been killed in the disaster. Those killed were:

- Jason Anderson, 35, of Midfield, Texas
- Donald Clark, 49, of Newellton, Louisiana
- Stephen Ray Curtis, 40, of Georgetown, Louisiana
- Aaron Dale Burkeen, 37, Philadelphia, Mississippi
- Gordon Jones, 28, of Baton Rouge, Louisiana
- Roy Wyatt Kemp, 27, Jonesville, Louisiana
- Karl Kleppinger Jr., 38, Natchez, Mississippi
- Keith Blair Manuel, 56, of Gonzales, Louisiana
- Dewey Revette, 48, of State Line, Mississippi
- Shane Roshto, 22, Liberty, Mississippi
- Adam Weise, 24, Yorktown, Texas

== Discovery of oil spill ==
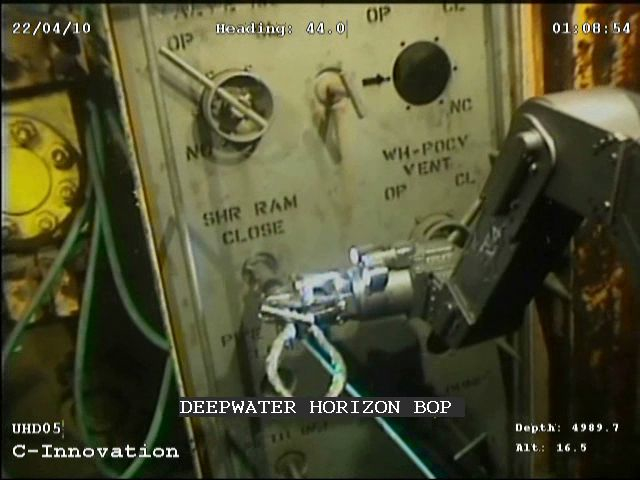
A remotely operated underwater vehicle attempting to turn on the Deepwater Horizon blowout preventer

On the morning of April 22, Coast Guard Petty Officer Ashley Butler stated that "oil was leaking from the rig at the rate of about 8,000 barrels [1,300 cubic meters] of crude per day." That afternoon Coast Guard Senior Chief Petty Officer Michael O'Berry used the same figure. Two remotely operated underwater vehicles (ROVs) were sent down in an attempt to cap the well but were unsuccessful. Butler warned of a leak of up to 700,000 U.S. gallons (2,600 cubic meters) of diesel fuel, and BP Vice President David Rainey termed the incident as being a potential "major spill". On April 23 a ROV reportedly found no oil leaking from the sunken rig and no oil flowing from the well. Coast Guard Rear Admiral Mary Landry expressed cautious optimism of zero environmental impact, stating that no oil was emanating from either the wellhead or the broken pipes and that oil spilled from the explosion and sinking was being contained. However the next day, Landry announced that a damaged wellhead was indeed leaking oil into the Gulf and described it as "a very serious spill".

== Investigation into explosion ==
Deepwater Horizon Blowout (2014) Official USCSB investigatory information film reel.

In June, the House Committee on Energy and Commerce said BP should have tested cement at the well, which would have cost them $128,000 and taken no more than 12 hours.

On September 8, 2010, BP released a 193-page report on its website. The report says BP employees and those at Transocean incorrectly interpreted a pressure test, and both companies neglected signs such as a riser pipe losing fluid. It also says that while BP did not listen to recommendations by Halliburton for more centralizers (devices to keep the casing from contacting the bore hole), the lack of centralizers probably did not affect the cement. BP also said the crew should have redirected the flow of flammable gases. The blowout preventer, removed on September 4, had not reached a NASA facility in time for it to be part of the report. Transocean, responding to the report, blamed "BP's fatally flawed well design".

On November 8, 2010, the inquiry by the Oil Spill Commission revealed its findings that BP had not sacrificed safety in attempts to make money, but that some decisions had increased risks on the rig. However, the panel said a day later that there had been "a rush to completion" on the well, criticizing poor management decisions; co-chair Bill Reilly stated that "[t]here was not a culture of safety on that rig". One of the decisions that met with tough questions was that BP refuted the findings of advanced modelling software that had ascertained over three times as many centralizers were needed on the rig. It also decided not to rerun the software when it stuck with only six centralizers, and ignored or misread warnings from other key tests, the panel revealed.

A slide briefly appeared on the Oil Spill Commission's website and republished by The New York Times enumerating eight "risky" and "unnecessary" steps that BP was deemed to have taken.

The report published by BP listed eight failures which led to the disaster:

- Inadequate cementing. Cementing proceeded a) without flushing the annulus around the shoe track at sufficiently high rate and duration to ensure full circumferential removal of compressed sediment and good distribution of cement, and b) without converting the float collar to activate its two check valves to prevent cement backflow.
- Valves to prevent cement backflow did not close. Weatherford's Auto-Fill float collar, which includes two flapper-type check valves, was installed at Macondo 180 feet (55 m) above the reamer shoe at casing bottom. The valves are held open by a 2-inch (51 mm) diameter auto-fill tube to allow the casing to fill with mud while it is lowered down the well. BP's casing installation procedure stated: "slowly increase (mud) pump rates greater than 8 bpm to convert the float equipment (at about 500 to 700 psi or 3,400 to 4,800 kPa) per Weatherford recommendation".
- Pressure test wrongly interpreted. Drill pipe was run to 8,367 feet (2,550 m) and was thought to be ready for mud displacement. During the "negative pressure test", for which there was no detailed procedure, a "no flow" result from the kill line was accepted, while a 1,400-psi result on the drill pipe was ignored.
- Leak not spotted soon enough. While displacing the mud with seawater, reservoir fluids rising up the casing should have been detected by water inflow and mud outflow monitoring before arrival of hydrocarbons at the rig floor, but no reasonably accurate outflow versus inflow observations were made.
- Valve in blowout preventer failed when crew attempted to close it.
- Mud–gas separator failure. Instead of venting mud and gas directly off the rig, the crew allowed it to flow through a device to separate gas from the flow of mud, which was overwhelmed.
- Gas alarm system failed.
- Flat battery in the blowout preventer. The blowout preventer incorporated systems which included a flat battery and a defective switch.

== Lawsuits ==
On April 21, 2011, BP filed $40 billion worth of lawsuits against rig owner Transocean, cementer Halliburton and blowout-preventer manufacturer Cameron. The oil firm alleged that failed safety systems and irresponsible behavior of contractors had led to the explosion, including claims that Halliburton "negligently" failed to use cement-modelling software OptiCem properly to analyze safe well requirements. Part of the modelling concern was about the number of stabilizing devices, known as centralizers, the well required; 21 were called for, but only 6 were used.

In May 2011, MOEX Offshore, which owned a 10% stake in the well through a subsidiary and which in turn itself was majority-owned by Mitsui & Co., agreed to pay US$1.08 billion to settle BP claims against it over the accident. Some analysts had thought BP would realize a larger settlement from MOEX but there was also relief to have a first step toward resolving the multiple claims. BP's most recent estimate at the time was that the spill would cost $41.3 billion. Anadarko Petroleum held a 25% stake in the Macondo well and was an immediate focus of attention with MOEX's agreement. Also, the Department of Justice was still at the time investigating whether BP was "grossly negligent" in the spill. Such a determination could lead to a "much larger liability under the Clean Water Act," a financial analyst said. With MOEX agreeing to share in the financial burden—though "the agreement isn't an admission of liability by either party"—the possibility of such a ruling by the Department of Justice seemed to some to be perhaps lessened.

In June 2011, supplier Weatherford International settled with BP for $75 million.

In October 2011, Anadarko Petroleum agreed to pay BP $4 billion and the two companies settled all claims between them. Anadarko yielded its 25% stake in Mississippi Canyon Block 252 (Macondo) to BP in the agreement and BP will indemnify Anadarko for damage claims arising under the U.S. Oil Pollution Act, among other costs.

In December 2011, Cameron International agreed to pay a $250 million settlement to BP PLC to settle all claims related to the Deepwater Horizon with neither party admitting responsibility. "BP still has not reached a settlement with Transocean ... nor Halliburton ... A trial date over lawsuits related to the accident awaits BP in February (2013)", the update continued.

In September 2014, Halliburton agreed to settle a large percentage of legal claims against it over the Deepwater spill by paying $1.1 billion into a trust by way of three installments over two years.

On September 4, 2014, U.S. District Judge Carl Barbier ruled BP was guilty of gross negligence and willful misconduct under the Clean Water Act (CWA). He described BP's actions as "reckless", while he said Transocean's and Halliburton's actions were "negligent". He apportioned 67% of the blame for the spill to BP, 30% to Transocean, and 3% to Halliburton. Fines would be apportioned commensurate with the degree of negligence of the parties, measured against the number of barrels of oil spilled. Under the Clean Water Act fines can be based on a cost per barrel of up to $4,300, at the discretion of the judge. The number of barrels was in dispute at the conclusion of the trial with BP arguing 2.5 million barrels (400,000 cubic meters) were spilled over the 87 days the spill lasted, while the court found that 4.2 million bbl (670,000 m^{3}) were spilled. BP issued a statement disagreeing with the finding, and saying the court's decision would be appealed.

In July 2015 BP reached an $18.7bn settlement with the US government, the states of Alabama, Florida, Louisiana, Mississippi and Texas, as well as 400 local authorities. BP's costs for the clean-up, environmental and economic damages and penalties had reached $54bn. In January 2018 a detailed estimate of the "Ultimate Costs of the Oil Spill", published in the Journal of Corporate Accounting and Finance, amounted to US$145.93 billion.

== In popular culture ==
=== Documentaries ===
- In 2011, Dispatches aired March 28, 2011, a documentary by James Brabazon, BP: In Deep Water, about the oil company BP, covering oil spills in the Gulf of Mexico and other incidents and its relationship with governments.
- In April 2012, the National Geographic Channel's documentary series Seconds from Disaster featured the accident in an episode titled "The Deepwater Horizon", released.
- In 2012, Beyond Pollution 2012 traveled across the gulf coast interviewing environmental experts, government authorities, fishermen, scientists, drilling engineers, and key BP contractors, examining economic and health effects.
- In 2012, The Big Fix, documented the April 2010 oil spill in the Gulf of Mexico following the sinking of the Deepwater Horizon oil rig.
- In 2014, The Great Invisible, by Margaret Brown chose to focus on the social impacts on people whose lives have been affected by this tragedy. It later aired on April 19, 2015, as episode 14 of season 16 of Independent Lens.
- In 2014, Vanishing Pearls: The Oystermen of Pointe a la Hache, Louisiana, documented the town of nearly 300 struggling to survive following the BP Oil Spill that left their crop dead and finances in ruin.
- In 2015, After the Spill, Jon Bowermaster investigates how the disaster affected local economies and the health of humans, animals, and food sources, and with Corexit, where all the oil went, as a follow-up to the pre-spill SoLa, Louisiana Water Stories, in post-production when the Deepwater Horizon exploded.
- In 2016, Pretty Slick, documented the cleanup effort and locals across four Gulf states about the largest man-made environmental disaster in U.S. history.
- In 2016, Dispatches From The Gulf, Hal Weiner follows scientists investigating the oil spill's effect on the Gulf.

=== Drama ===
- In 2012, "We Just Decided To", the pilot of the HBO TV series The Newsroom, featured its characters covering the Deepwater Horizon story.
- The 2015 film The Runner, directed by Austin Stark and starring Nicolas Cage, is a fictional story of a politician and his family set in the aftermath of the Deepwater Horizon disaster.
- In 2016, Deepwater Horizon, a film based on the explosion, directed by Peter Berg and starring Mark Wahlberg, Kurt Russell, and John Malkovich was released.

=== Music ===
- In June 2010, Steve Goodie, a comedy musician, wrote parody lyrics to The Doobie Brothers' hit song "Black Water" related to the BP oil spill. "Black Water [BP Version]" also had a YouTube video and was a Top Ten hit on The Dr. Demento radio show.
- In 2011, Rise Against released a song titled "Help Is on the Way" on their album Endgame. The song is about the slow response time for aid to disaster-stricken areas, with lyrics that allude to the Macondo spill and Hurricane Katrina.
- In 2011, City and Colour released a song titled "At the Bird's Foot" on their album Little Hell, which laments the explosion and subsequent lives lost.
- In 2012, the Dutch band Epica wrote a song titled "Deep Water Horizon" on their album Requiem for the Indifferent which highlighted humanity's take on the effect we have on global warming inspired by the events of the oil spill.
- The oil spill inspired Steve Earle's song "Gulf of Mexico".
- Andrew Bird's 2012 album Break It Yourself contains the song "Hole In The Ocean Floor" which laments the devastation caused by the Deepwater Horizon disaster.

== See also ==
- Ixtoc I oil spill
- Offshore oil and gas in the Gulf of Mexico (United States)
- Timeline of the Deepwater Horizon oil spill
