= OTS =

OTS, OTs or Ots may refer to:

== Arts and entertainment ==
- Orchestra at Temple Square, an LDS orchestra located in Salt Lake City, US
- Over-the-shoulder shot, a film technique

== Organizations ==
=== Companies ===
- Ocean Therapy Solutions, U.S. company making centrifuge pumps for oceanic oil spill cleanup

=== Government ===
- Office for Transportation Security, Philippines
- Office of Tax Simplification, a United Kingdom Treasury tax office
- Office of Technical Service, a division of the Central Intelligence Agency
- Office of Thrift Supervision, a U.S. Treasury Department agency
- Office of Transport Security, Australia
- Organization of Turkic States, international organization comprising prominent independent Turkic countries

=== Military ===
- Air Force Officer Training School, a U.S. Air Force training center
- Officers' Training School RAAF, a Royal Australian Air Force training center
- Officers Training School, Bahtoo, a Myanmar army training centre

=== Religion ===
- Ohr Torah Stone, an international Modern Orthodox organization
- Orthodox Theological Seminary, Kottayam, a seminary under the Indian Orthodox Church
- Order of the Solar Temple (French: Ordre du Temple solaire, OTS), French esoteric cult

== Science and technology ==
- Octadecyltrichlorosilane, a chemical forming self-assembled monolayers
- OpenTimestamps, a cryptographic timestamping standard
- Operator Training Simulator, a simulation platform for industrial operator training
- Orbital Test Satellite, a European Space Agency program
- Organization for Tropical Studies, a U.S.-based group of biological research stations in Costa Rica
- TsO (tosylate), the anion of p-toluenesulfonic acid, a tosyl compound

== Transportation ==
- MS Georg Ots, a ferry named for Georg Ots
- Anacortes Airport (IATA code: OTS), in Anacortes, Washington, US

== Other uses ==
- Georg Ots (1920–1975), Estonian musician
- Izh (river) (Tatar: Otš), in Tatarstan, Russia
- Opportunity to see, a measure of the penetration of advertising
- OuT of Service

== See also ==
- Off-the-shelf (disambiguation)
