= MOTS =

MOTS may refer to:

- Man on the street
- Military off-the-shelf
- Modified Off-The-Shelf - a standard product that can be modified after purchase to suit the needs of the user
- Momac-Offshore-Transfer-System, a computer based Offshore-Access-System (OAS), that allows a transfer of persons and material between ships even at moving sea
- Star Wars Jedi Knight: Mysteries of the Sith, an expansion pack for the first-person shooter Star Wars Jedi Knight: Dark Forces II
- Marginally outer trapped surfaces - black hole boundaries in General Relativity
- Music of the Sun, an album by Rihanna
- Music of the Spheres, an album by Coldplay
  - "Music of the Spheres I", a song by Coldplay
  - "Music of the Spheres II", a song by Coldplay
  - Music of the Spheres World Tour, a 2022 concert tour supporting the album of the same name
- Map of the Soul, a phrase used on the title of various BTS releases
  - Map of the Soul: Persona, a 2019 EP by BTS
  - Map of the Soul: 7, a 2020 album by BTS
  - Map of the Soul: 7 – The Journey, a 2020 Japanese version album of Map of the Soul: 7 by BTS
  - Map of the Soul Tour, a cancelled worldwide concert tour by BTS

== See also ==
- Off-the-shelf
