= Mitsui & Co. =

Japanese corporation

Mitsui & Co., Ltd.

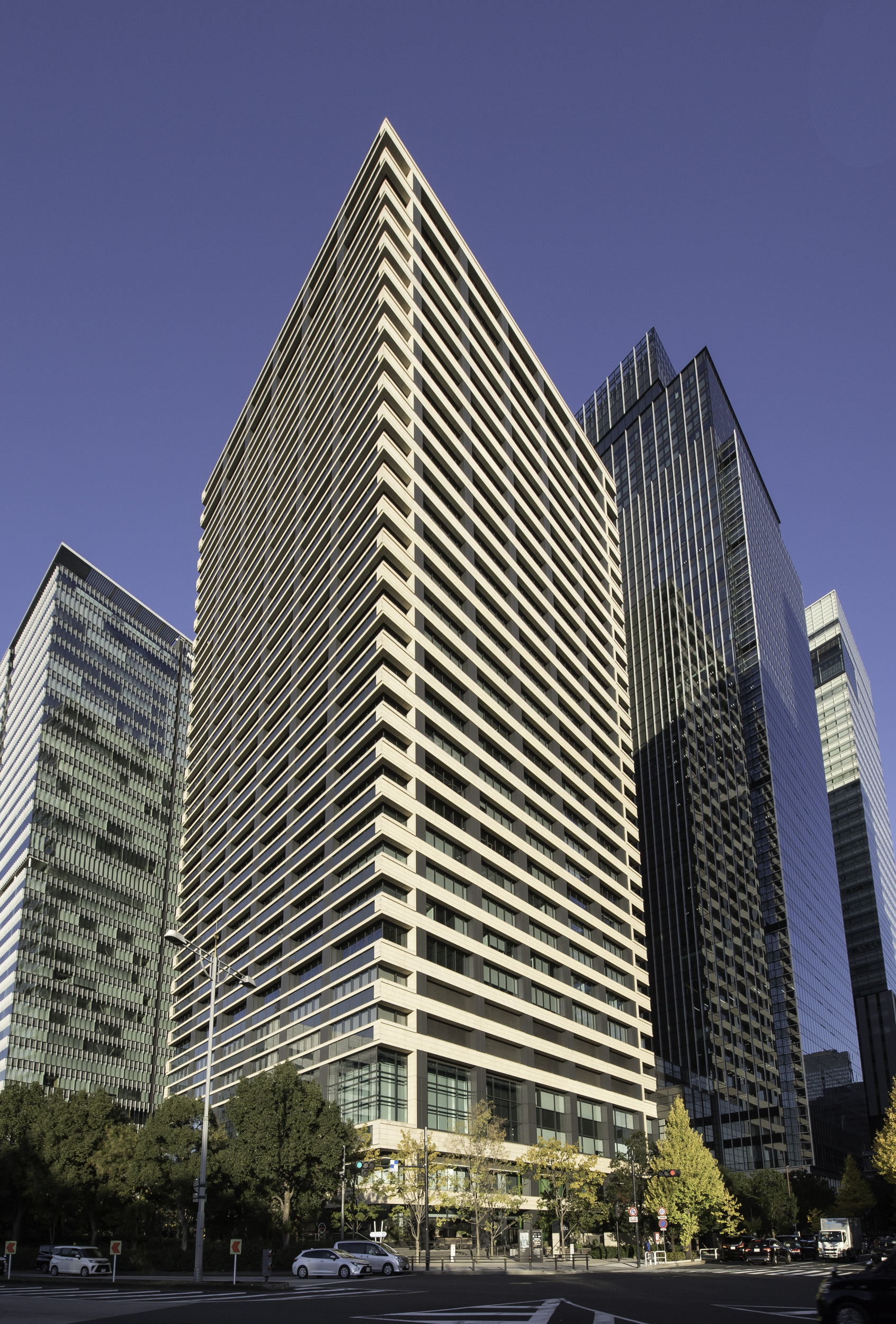
- Headquarters in Ōtemachi, Chiyoda, Tokyo
- Native name: 三井物産株式会社
- Romanized name: Mitsui Bussan kabushiki gaisha
- Type: Public (Kabushiki gaisha)
- Traded as: TYO: 8031; NAG: 8031; FSE: 8031; Nikkei 225 component (TYO); TOPIX Core30 component (TYO); Nasdaq: MITSY (1971–2011)
- Industry: Sogo shosha
- Founded: July 25, 1947; 79 years ago
- Founders: Takashi Masuda; Tatsuzo Minakami
- Headquarters: Mitsui & Co. Headquarters Building, 2-1, Otemachi 1-chome, Chiyoda-ku, Tokyo 100-8631, Japan, Tokyo, Japan
- Area served: 132 Offices in 64 Countries / Regions (2020)
- Key people: Tatsuo Yasunaga (Chairman); Kenichi Hori (President and CEO)
- Products: Iron & steel products; Mineral & metal resources; Infrastructure projects; Chemicals; Energy; Food Products & Services; Consumer Services; IT & Communication Business
- Revenue: ▼¥14 trillion (US$88.43 billion) (FY2026)
- Operating income: ▼¥1.09 trillion (US$6.88 billion) (FY2026)
- Net income: ▼¥834 billion (US$5.27 billion) (FY2026)
- Total assets: ▲¥19.9 trillion (US$125.72 billion) (FY2026)
- Total equity: ▲¥8.43 trillion (US$53.22 billion) (FY2026)
- Number of employees: 55,463 (2026)
- Subsidiaries: 280 Subsidiaries, 234 Equity Accounted Investees (2021)
- Website: mitsui.com

Mitsui & Co., Ltd. (Japanese: 三井物産株式会社, Hepburn: Mitsui Bussan Kabushiki-gaisha) is a Japanese general trading company (sogo shosha) and a core member of the Mitsui Group. For much of the post-war period, Mitsui & Co. has been among the largest of the five great sogo shosha (Mitsui, Mitsubishi, Itochu, Sumitomo, Marubeni) by revenue as well as profits.

Mitsui & Co. was established in 1876 by transferring the staff and assets of Senshu Gaisha, a trading company, to the Mitsui Group. It became the largest textile trader in the 19th century, at a time when textiles were the backbone of Japan's economy. Around that period, the company expanded into trading raw materials, machinery, and arms, gaining significant influence both economically and politically. Deemed a key component of the pre-war regime in Japan, the company was split up as part of the dissolution of the major zaibatsu in the immediate aftermath of the Second World War.

Several trading companies with roots tracing back to the pre-war Mitsui, most notably Daiichi Bussan Kaisha, Ltd., merged to take on the name Mitsui & Co. in 1959. This allowed Mitsui to regain its position as the largest trading house in Japan, but the loss of its Iranian petroleum interests following the Iranian Revolution in 1979 gave Mitsubishi the opportunity to take the lead.

Mitsui & Co. is listed on the Tokyo Stock Exchange, where it is part of the blue-chip TOPIX Core 30 and the Nikkei 225 indices. It is also known as one of the highest-paying publicly listed employers in Japan. In terms of global recognition, Mitsui & Co. was ranked 121st in the Fortune Global 500, and 108th in the Forbes Global 2000 in 2024.

== History ==
=== Founding ===
==== Origins ====
Mitsui & Co. originated in 1876 when the Mitsui group took over Kaoru Inoue's trading house Senshu Gaisha (先収会社) and appointed Takashi Masuda as manager. Early contracts included a lucrative commission monopoly to market coal from Miike mine, and the firm opened its first overseas office in Shanghai later in 1876 to handle exports. By the mid Meiji period Mitsui & Co. had broadened into rice, tea and raw silk exports, and the import of industrial machinery.

=== Interwar period ===
==== Expansion in textile and machinery ====
As industrial capitalism rapidly progressed around the Sino-Japanese and Russo-Japanese Wars, Mitsui & Co. integrated cotton and silk into its core trading lines and expanded overseas markets in East Asia.

By the early 1910s Mitsui Bussan exported over 20% of Japan’s total raw silk and had become the largest silk exporter domestically and internationally; silk already exceeded 10% of the company’s total trade by that time. The First World War drove a surge in scale: sales rose from c.¥400m pre-war to ¥2.1bn in 1919, with more than 1,000 types of items handled.

==== Siemens–Vickers scandal ====
In 1914, the Siemens scandal exposed bribery in naval procurement. The scandal started when it was revealed that Siemens bribed naval officers to win contracts for naval equipment from the Imperial Navy. This led to a large-scale investigation across the navy, and it was eventually exposed that the British builder Vickers and its Japanese agent Mitsui & Co. bribed Naval Officers to win the contract for the battlecruiser Kongō, the last Japanese battleship to be built abroad. Court records and scholarship identify testimony from Mitsui & Co. directors in relation to the Kongō order. The affair triggered the fall of the Yamamoto cabinet.

=== Post-war period ===
==== Dissolution and reformation ====
SCAP (Supreme Commander for the Allied Powers)'s 3 July 1947 directive ordered the dissolution of Mitsubishi and Mitsui trading companies via the Holding Company Liquidation Commission (HCLC). Mitsui Honsha (the holding company of the entire group) itself was wound up in 1946 as part of the same programme. Mitsui's businesses were split among a few successor companies established by its employees. Daiichi Bussan Kaisha, Ltd. (First Bussan Corporation Ltd.) was one of the major ones among them. In 1959, after the end of the Allied Occupation, it merged with several other trading companies also descended from the pre-war Mitsui & Co. and reassumed the name Mitsui & Co., Ltd.

==== Post-war growth ====
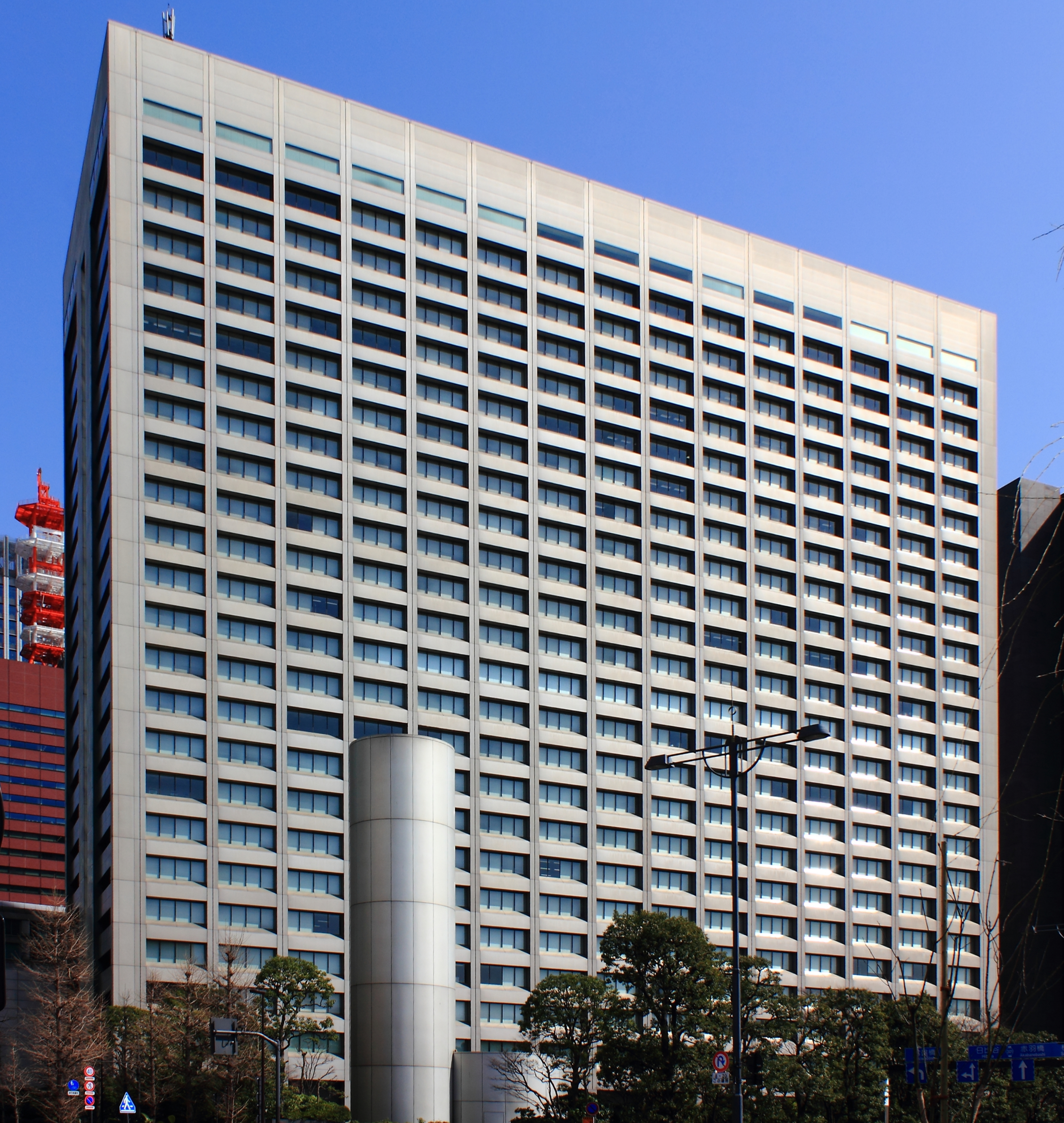
Former headquarters (demolished in 2015)

During Japan's period of rapid postwar economic growth, the firm was a key player in several major natural resources projects. In 1971, it took a stake in an offshore gas field near Das Island in Abu Dhabi, which supplies liquefied natural gas to Japan on an exclusive basis; it invested in a major Western Australian LNG project in 1985 and in the Sakhalin II project in 1994.

Its subsidiary Mitsui Oil Exploration's MOEX Offshore had a 10% stake in the Deepwater Horizon well in the Gulf of Mexico through a subsidiary, and in May 2011, MOEX agreed to pay US$1.07 billion to settle BP claims against it over the explosion and oil spill at the well. Some analysts had thought BP would realize a larger settlement from MOEX, but there was also relief to have a first step toward resolving the multiple claims.

Berkshire Hathaway acquired over 5% of the stock in the company, along with four other Japanese trading houses, over the 12-month period ending in August 2020.

== Business areas ==
Mitsui engages in six major business areas:

- Energy: Upstream development and trading in oil and gas, the firm's's largest line of business, accounting for over half of its consolidated EBITDA and net earnings in the first half of fiscal year 2015. Mitsui has two major energy projects in the United States, at the Marcellus Shale in the Mid-Atlantic and the Eagle Ford Shale in Texas.
- Metals: Development and trading with a focus on iron ore and steel. This business accounts for about a quarter of consolidated EBITDA and net earnings. In 2014 Mitsui acquired a stake in the Moatize coal mine and Nacala rail and port development in Mozambique from the Brazilian mining company Vale.
- Chemicals: basic and performance chemicals including fertilizers, electronics materials and functional materials.
- Machinery and Infrastructure: Sells, finances and invests in large-scale plants, ships, aircraft, automobiles and other heavy machinery.
- Lifestyle: food, retail, healthcare, fashion, forestry and real estate. In 2014, CEO Masami Iijima identified this segment as an area of particular interest, particularly in relation to Mitsui's cooperation with Lippo Group in Indonesia.
- Information and Corporate Development: information technology, finance and logistics.

== Criticism ==
Mitsui & Co. has faced criticism for continuing its operations in Russia despite the Russian invasion of Ukraine and the imposition of international sanctions. The Japanese trading giant has maintained its stake in the Sakhalin-2 liquefied natural gas (LNG) project, citing the need to ensure energy supplies to Japan. Mitsui holds a combined 22.5% share in the project, which remains operational under Russian control following the Kremlin's restructuring. Although the company has reduced the book value of its investments due to "growing business uncertainty," it has not fully withdrawn, unlike some Western companies. Mitsui also retains a 10% share in Novatek's Arctic LNG-2 project, despite Japan freezing new investments in the initiative. Critics argue that Mitsui's continued involvement undermines the global effort to isolate Russia economically, indirectly supporting a regime responsible for ongoing war crimes and atrocities in Ukraine.

== Group Companies ==
Steel Products Division

- Mitsui & Co. Steel Ltd. - Domestic sales and import/export of construction and civil engineering steel materials, steel plates, special steel wire, etc.
- Regency Steel Asia Pte Ltd - Wholesaling of steel products
- Bangkok Coil Center Co., Ltd - Sales and processing of steel materials
- Mitsui & Co. Steeltrade - Trading and domestic sales of steel products
- Nippon Steel Trading Co., Ltd. (Joint venture with Nippon Steel) - Sales and import/export of steel, machinery/infrastructure, textiles, food, and other products
- NST Sanko Trading Co., Ltd
- Shanghai Bao-Mit Steel Distribution Co., Ltd. - Processing and sales of steel products
- Siam Yamato Steel Co., Ltd. (Joint venture with Daewoo Industries) - Manufacturing and sales of steel products
- Gestamp 2020, S.L - Investment in automotive press parts business
- Gestamp NORTH AMERICA, INC. - Automotive press parts business

Metal Resources Division

- Mitsui Coal Holdings Pty. Ltd. - Investment in Australian coal-related businesses
- Mitsui Iron Ore Development Pty. Ltd. - Mining and sales of Australian iron ore
- Mitsui Iron Ore Corporation Pty. Ltd. - Mining and sales of Australian iron ore
- Mitsui-Itochu Iron Pty. Ltd. - Mining and sales of Australian iron ore
- Mitsui & Co. Iron Ore Exploration & Mining Pty. Ltd. - Mining and sales of Australian iron ore
- Mitsui Development - Overseas coal mine development including import coal sales for general industries and investments
- Japan Collahuasi Resources B.V. - Investment in Chilean copper mine (Collahuasi Copper Mine)
- Nacala Corridor Holding Netherlands B.V. - Railway sales of coal, general cargo, and passengers in Mozambique
- Mitsui Metals - Domestic sales and trading of non-ferrous products, scrap, etc.
- Mitsui Bussan Copper Investment & Co., Ltd. - Investment in Chilean copper mine (Caserones Copper Mine)
- Mitsui Mineral Resources Development (Latin America) Limitada. - Investment in Chilean copper mine (copper mine under Anglo American)
- Mitsui & Co. Mineral Resources Development (Asia) Corp. - Investment in nickel and cobalt refining business in the Philippines
- BHP Mitsui Coal Pty. Ltd. - Mining and sales of coal
- Nippon Amazon Aluminum - Investment in Brazilian aluminum refining business
- Inner Mongolia Erdos Electric Power & Metallurgical Co., Ltd. - Coal, power, ferroalloy, Yellow River diversion, and chemical products

Project Division

- Mitsui & Co. Plant Systems - Sales of various plants, power-related equipment, and railway equipment
- Mitsui Power Ventures limited - Investment in power generation business
- MIT POWER CANADA LP INC. - Investment in power generation business in Canada
- MITSUI GAS E ENERGIA DO BRASIL LTDA. - Investment in gas distribution business
- Atlatec, S.A. de C.V. - Design, construction, and operation of wastewater and sewage treatment facilities
- Tokyo International Air Cargo Terminal - Construction and operation of cargo terminals in the international area of Tokyo International Airport
- Portek International Private Limited - Container terminal and multipurpose port operation, sale of handling equipment, provision of port engineering services
- MT FALCON HOLDINGS COMPANY, S.A.P.I - Investment in power generation business in Mexico
- Toyo Engineering (Joint venture with Mitsui Chemicals and Obayashi Corporation) - Plant engineering
- IPM Eagle LLP - Investment in power generation business in Europe and Puerto Rico
- P.T. Paiton Energy - Investment in power generation business in Indonesia
- Compañía de Generación Valladolid S. de R.L. de C.V. - Investment in power generation business in Mexico
- AES JORDAN HOLDCO, LTD. - Investment in power generation business in Jordan
- RLC Power Holding Company Limited - Investment in desalination power generation business in Qatar

Mobility Division 1

- Toyota Chile S.A. - Import and sales of automobiles and parts
- Veloce Logistica SA - Logistics services for automobile production plants (transportation, warehouses, etc.)
- Mitsui Bussan Automotive (Thailand) Co., Ltd. - Sales of automobiles, trucks, and buses
- P.T. Bussan Auto Finance - Motorcycle sales finance
- Mitsui Autozam - Import and export of completed vehicles, parts, production facilities, and vehicle net auctions
- Hino Motors Sales Mexico S.A. de C.V. - Import and sales of Hino trucks and spare parts
- Transystem Logistics International Pvt.Ltd. - Automotive-related logistics services
- Ellison Technologies Inc. - Sales, engineering, and services of machine tools, conveyors, and other equipment
- Mitsui Machinery Techno - Sales of machine tools, injection molding machines, and other equipment
- Mitsui Rail Capital Participações Ltda. - Investment in Brazilian freight wagon leasing business
- Komatsu-Mitsui Maquinarias Peru S.A. (Joint venture with Komatsu) - Sales and maintenance of Komatsu mining and construction machinery
- Road Machinery, LLC - Sales and maintenance of Komatsu mining and construction machinery in Arizona and California
- Mitsui Auto Finance Chile LTDA. - Automobile sales and finance
- TOYOTA Canada Inc. - Import and sales of automobiles and parts
- Penske Automotive Group, Inc. - Automobile retail and comprehensive transportation business
- Penske Truck Leasing Co., L.P. - Truck leasing, rental, and logistics business
- P.T. Yamaha Indonesia Motor Manufacturing (Joint venture with Yamaha Motor) - Manufacture and sales of motorcycles
- Komatsu Marketing Support Australia Pty. Ltd. (Joint venture with Komatsu) - Sales and maintenance of Komatsu mining and construction machinery
- VLI S.A. - Railroad freight transport business
- Odebrecht Mobilidade S.A - Railroad passenger transport business
- Solar Koken Rent - Comprehensive rental of construction machinery and equipment

Mobility Division 2

- Toyo Shipping - Management of ships, ship and used ship brokerage, sale of shipborne equipment
- OMC Shipping Pte. Ltd. - Ship ownership business
- M&T Aviation Finance (Ireland) - Investment in aircraft leasing business
- Mitsui Aerospace - Import and sales of helicopters and aerospace-related equipment
- Mitsui Rail Capital Holdings, Inc. - Investment in North American railroad-related businesses
- MRCE Group - European locomotive-related leasing business

Basic Materials Division

- Shark Bay Salt Pty. Ltd. - Salt production business
- Mitsui Chemical - Domestic sales and trading of solvents, paints, and other chemicals
- Fairway Methanol LLC - Manufacture and sales of methanol
- Hi-Bis GmbH - Manufacture of chemicals mainly for automotive applications
- Honshu Chemical Industry (Joint venture with Mitsui Chemical) - Manufacture and sale of various chemicals
- International Methanol Company - Manufacture and sales of methanol
- Kansai Helios Coatings GmbH (Joint venture with Kansai Paint) - Manufacture of paints, synthetic resins, adhesives, and other chemical products

Performance Materials Division

- Mitsui Plastics - Comprehensive wholesale business centered on synthetic resins
- Mitsui Plastics Trading (Shanghai) Co., Ltd. - Marketing and sales of synthetic resins, synthetic rubber, and related products
- Advanced Composites, Inc. - Manufacturing and sales of plastic compounds, etc.
- Mitsui & Co. Packaging - Pulp and packaging-related businesses
- Mitsui Bussan Woodchip Oceania Pty. Ltd. - Reforestation and wood chip production and sales business
- SMB Building Materials (Integration of Sumitomo Corporation and Marubeni Corporation's building materials sales departments) - Sales of construction materials, construction work contracting

Nutrition & Agriculture Division

- Mitsui Food Science - Manufacture and sales of sugar alcohols (sorbitol, xylitol, etc.)
- San-ei Seika - Manufacture of glucose and other saccharified products and dairy products
- Mitsui Agribusiness - Sales of fertilizer-related materials, development and sales of agricultural materials
- Mitsui AgriScience International S.A./N.V. - Supervision of European agricultural business
- Top Tanker - Tanker transportation of petrochemical products
- Soda Perfume (Joint venture with Toray Industries) - Manufacture and sales of fragrance-related products
- MVM Resources International B.V. - Investment in Peruvian phosphate ore mining and sales business

Energy Division 1

- Mitsui E&P Australia Pty Limited - Exploration, development, and production of oil and natural gas in Oceania
- Mitsui E&P Middle East B.V. - Exploration, development, and production of oil and natural gas in the Middle East
- Mitsui E&P UK Limited - Exploration, development, and production of oil and natural gas in Europe
- Mitsui Oil Development - Exploration, development, and production of oil and natural gas
- Mitsui E&P USA LLC - Exploration, development, and production of shale gas
- Mitsui E&P Texas LP - Exploration, development, and production of shale gas/oil
- Mitsui & Co. Energy Trading Singapore Pte. Ltd. - Spot and futures trading of crude oil and petroleum products
- ENEOS Globe (Joint venture with ENEOS and Marubeni) - Import and domestic sales of liquefied gas, etc.

Energy Division 2

- Mitsui Sakhalin Holdings B.V. - Investment in Sakhalin Energy Investment
- Mitsui E&P Mozambique Area 1 Limited - Exploration, development, and production of oil and natural gas in Mozambique
- Mitsui & Co. Energy Marketing and Services (USA), Inc. - Natural gas sales with upstream interests, as well as natural gas trading in the United States
- Mitsui LNG Nederland B.V. - Investment in the Qatar LNG project and development of oil and natural gas in Qatar
- Japan Australia LNG (MIMI) Pty. Ltd. - Exploration, development, and production of oil and natural gas

Energy Solutions Division

- Forefront Power, LLC - Development and operation of solar power distributed generation businesses, provision of energy solutions for end users (solar energy, energy storage services, etc.)

Food Division

- PRI Foods Co., LTD. - Production, processing, and sales of broilers
- Tobu Bussan - Import and sales of various agricultural and aquatic products
- United Grain Corporation of Oregon - Grain distribution business
- Agricola Xingu S.A - Agricultural production business
- Mitsui Nohrin (Joint venture with Mitsui Fudosan) - Manufacturing and sales of tea, green tea, and beverages for vending machines
- MITSUI ALIMENTOS LTDA. - Export of coffee beans, coffee roasting, and domestic sales
- Mitsui Food Material - Import/export, manufacturing, and sales of fruit/vegetable juice and processed products, and sales of dairy products
- Feed One - Manufacture and sales of compound feed, procurement/sales/production/processing of livestock and aquaculture products, etc.
- DM Mitsui Sugar Holdings - Holding company
- DM Mitsui Sugar - Sugar refining business
- Kadoya Sesame Mills (Capital and business alliance with Mitsubishi Shoji) - Extraction, refining, and processing of oilseed raw materials, and sales of oil and fat products
- Startzen - Meat processing and sales, production and sales of meat products/food products

Distribution Division

- Mitsui & Co. Distribution Holdings - Oversight of group companies responsible for intermediate distribution functions
- Mitsui Food - Comprehensive food wholesale business
- Vendor Service - Sales of food ingredients, container packaging materials, packaging materials, etc.
- Mitsui Logistics Solutions - Logistics center management business
- Retail System Service - Sales and service of food ingredients and miscellaneous goods
- Mitsui Bussan Logistics, Inc. - Sales of food, groceries, containers, etc.
- WILSEY FOODS, INC. - Investment in Ventura Foods LLC, a processed oil and fat food company
- Beijing Baiwangda Trading Co., Ltd. - Sales and service of food ingredients and miscellaneous goods
- Mitsui Food Fashion - Production planning and management of textile products
- Paul Stuart Inc - Retail business of high-end clothing and accessories
- ALCANTARA S.p.A. - Manufacture and sales of artificial leather
- Bigi Holdings - Planning, manufacturing, and sales of clothing and accessories (holding company of Bigi Group)

Healthcare Services Division

- MBK Healthcare Management - Operating partner and healthcare technology investment arm of Mitsui & Co.
- IHH Healthcare Berhad - Hospital management and healthcare-related business
- PHC Holdings - Supervision of development, manufacturing, and sales of medical devices such as blood glucose meters for diabetes patients
- PHC - Development, manufacturing, and sales of medical devices such as blood glucose meters for diabetes patients
- Nihon Microbio Pharma - Manufacturing of pharmaceutical raw materials and functional chemicals using microorganisms, manufacturing acceptance, and drug discovery support business
- Ho Ken Dojin Sha - Publishing of health-related books, etc.
- Fuji Pharmaceutical Industry - Development, manufacturing, and sales of medical pharmaceuticals
- Aramark (Joint venture with US-based Aramark) - Facility management services (cleaning, catering, etc.)
- Mitsui Facilities (formerly Mitsui Real Estate Facilities) - Comprehensive building, condominium management and comprehensive management, plant operations
- UHS Partners - Dispatching and introduction of physicians, therapists, and nurses through subsidiaries (Delta, Accountable)

ICT Division

- Mitsui Information - ICT system consulting, construction, operation, sales of data centers, cloud services, IoT devices, manufacturing equipment
- Mitsui SecureDirection - Cybersecurity diagnosis, monitoring, and consulting services
- World Hi-Vision Channel - BS digital broadcasting business
- Relaia Communications - Call center, outsourcing/contract services
- QVC Japan - TV home shopping business
- Dynamic Plus - Revenue management services with "price" as the theme, provided through a joint venture with Z Holdings and Pia

Corporate Development Division

- Mitsui Asset Management Holdings - Supervision of domestic real estate asset management business
- Mitsui Logistics Partners - Asset management of logistics facility REIT "Nihon Logistics Fund"
- Mitsui Realty Management - Asset management business of private real estate funds and private REITs "Mitsui & Co. Private Investment Trust"
- Mitsui & Co. Idera Partners - Asset management business of J-REIT "Investment Corporation MIRAI"
- Mitsui Alternative Investments - Brokerage of alternative investment products such as hedge funds
- Mitsui Insurance - Property and life insurance agency business
- Mitsui Corporate Investment - Buyout investment business
- Mitsui & Co. Global Investment (USA) Inc. - Venture investment business
- Mitsui Bussan Commodities Ltd. - Energy and derivative trading, non-ferrous metal dealing
- Mitsui Global Logistics - Warehouse operations, transportation, customs clearance, real estate leasing, international integrated transportation, etc.
- Konan Pier - Warehouse operations, port operations, transportation service
- MITSUI & CO. GLOBAL LOGISTICS (ASIA) PTE LTD - International integrated transportation business
- Mitsui Urban Development (formerly Mitsui Real Estate) - Real estate development, leasing, sale, solution business, etc.
- Mitsui Financial Management - Accounting management-related business
- MBK Real Estate LLC - Real estate-related business
- MBK Real Estate Asia Pte. Ltd. - Real estate development business in Southeast Asia
- JA Mitsui Leasing (Integration of Mitsui Leasing business with JA Group) - Comprehensive leasing business

Americas Division

- Mitsui Foods, Inc. - Wholesale of canned food, frozen food, tea, beverage ingredients, coffee, etc.
- Intercontinental Terminals Company LLC - Leasing of chemical tanks
- Game Changer Holdings Inc. - Investment in steel processing and sales companies
- Novus International, Inc. - Manufacture and sales of feed additives
- MITSUI PLASTICS INC. - Sales of chemicals
- Mitsui Agro Business S.A. - Investment in South American fertilizer sales business
- Mit-Salmon Chile SpA - Investment in Salmones Multiexport S.A. (Salmon farming, processing, and sales business)
- Shiko Beauty Inc. – online marketplace of expertly curated Japanese skincare beauty products

Europe, Middle East, and Africa Division

- EURO-MIT STAAL B.V. - Slit processing and sales of electromagnetic steel plates to European transformer manufacturers, etc.
- GEG (HOLDINGS) LIMITED - Fabrication, repair, and technical support of marine structures for petroleum, gas, and renewable energy
- ITC RUBIS TERMINAL ANTWERP NV - Tank terminal business including storage and warehousing services for petrochemical and gasification products

Asia and Oceania Division

- Mitsui Water Holdings (Thailand) Ltd. - Investment in water supply business
- PT Kingsford Holdings - Investment in PT Champion Pacific Indonesia

Others

- Mitsui & Co. Financial Services - Financial services for related companies
- Mitsui & Co. Financial Services (Asia) Ltd. - Financial services for related companies
- Mitsui & Co. Financial Services (Europe) Plc. - Financial services for related companies
- Mitsui & Co. Financial Services (U.S.A.) Inc. - Financial services for related companies
- Mitsui & Co. Trading Services - Financial services for related companies
- Mitsui & Co. Credit Consulting - Financial services for related companies
- Mitsui & Co. Business Partners - Outsourcing of personnel and general affairs-related business
- Moon Creative Lab Inc. - Business design consulting
