= James A. Watson =

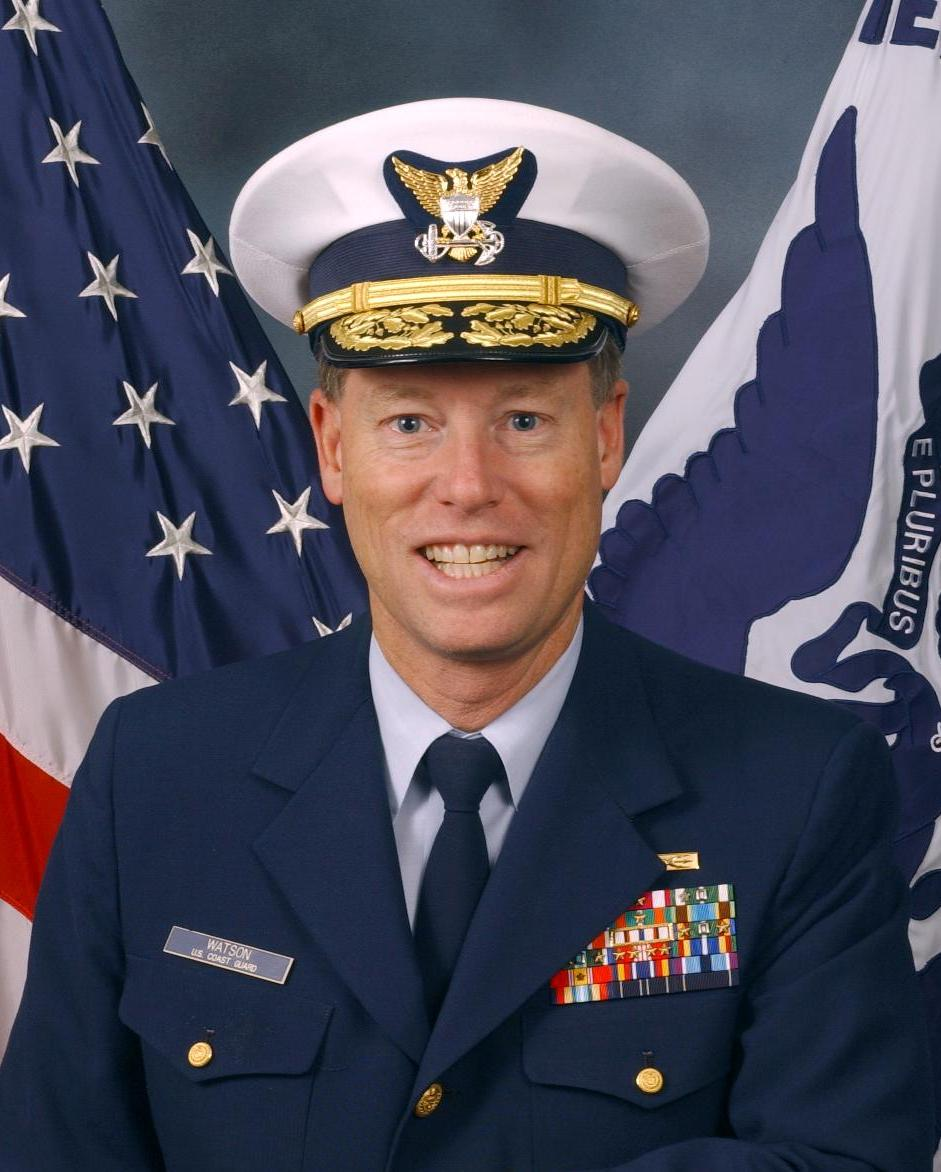
- Born: April 30, 1956 (age 70); Baltimore, Maryland, U.S.
- Allegiance: United States of America
- Branch: United States Coast Guard
- Service years: 1974–2012
- Rank: Rear Admiral
- Conflicts: September 11 attacks
- Education: University of Michigan; Industrial College of the Armed Forces

James Angus Watson IV (born April 30, 1956) is a retired United States Coast Guard Rear Admiral. He currently serves as a senior vice president at the American Bureau of Shipping.

== Education and career ==
Watson became Deputy Commander, Coast Guard Atlantic Area Command in April 2010. Among his duties is Federal On Scene Coordinator of the Deepwater Horizon oil spill. He succeeded Mary Landry on June 1, 2010 in that position. He had been her deputy.

He first graduated with honors from Mount Saint Joe in 1974 followed by the United States Coast Guard Academy in 1978 with a Bachelor of Science degree in Marine Engineering. He received Master of Science degrees in 1985 in Mechanical Engineering and Naval Architecture from the University of Michigan. He received a Master of Science degree in Strategic Studies from the Industrial College of the Armed Forces.

He was Engineering Officer/Student Engineer aboard the USCGC Bibb (WPG-31) (1978–1980). In headquarters he was Staff Engineer – Marine Technical and Hazardous Materials Division (1980–1983), Staff Naval Architect - USCG Marine Safety Center (1986–1989), Chief of Port Operations Marine Safety Office Puget Sound (1989–1992), Executive Officer Marine Safety Office Savannah (1992–1995), Commanding Officer Marine Safety Office San Diego (1995–1998), Program Reviewer - Office of Budget and Programs (1998–2000), Commanding Officer Marine Safety Office Miami (2001–2004), Chief, Office of Budget and Programs, Coast Guard Headquarters (2004–2006), Chief of Staff of the Seventh Coast Guard District in Miami (2006–2007).

He was promoted to flag officer in 2007 as Director of Prevention Policy for Marine Safety, Security and Stewardship, Coast Guard Headquarters where he was responsible for Waterways Management, Boating Safety, Commercial Vessel Safety and Security, Ports and Cargo Safety and Security, Maritime Investigations, and Quality Traveling Inspectors, Atlantic Area’s first Director of Operations and Coast Guard Atlantic Area Command in April 2010. Watson retired in June 2012 to become Director of the Bureau of Safety and Environmental Enforcement at the United States Department of the Interior.

His personal military awards include the Distinguished Service Award, five Legions of Merit, two Meritorious Service Medals, and six Coast Guard Commendation Medals.

== Personal ==
In the 2024 United States presidential election, Watson endorsed Kamala Harris.

== Command events ==
- 2003 Al-Qaeda attack on SS Norway during Top-Off 2 in Miami
- BP Deepwater Horizon cleanup
