= DD3 =

DD3 may refer to:

- DD3, a postcode district in the DD postcode area
- Nilavuku En Mel Ennadi Kobam, working title DD3, a 2024 Indian romantic comedy film by Dhanush
- Destruction Derby Raw
- Double Dragon 3: The Rosetta Stone
- Development Driller III
- Aldo-keto reductase family 1, member A1, enzyme
