= Off-the-shelf =

Off-the-shelf may refer to:

- Commercial off-the-shelf, a phrase in computing and industrial supply terminology
- Government off-the-shelf, software and hardware government products that are ready to use and which were created and are owned by a government agency
- Ready-to-wear, mass produced clothing sold in finished condition in standardized sizes instead of being tailored to a particular person's frame
- Shelf corporation, a registered company purposefully with no activity, for various reasons
- Off the Shelf Festival, a festival of writing and reading which takes place each year in Sheffield, United Kingdom
- A product recall (the product is "taken off the shelf")

== See also ==
- Aftermarket
- Out-of-box
- OTS (disambiguation)
