= Mitsui Oil Exploration =

Mitsui Oil Exploration Co. 三井石油開発株式会社
- Industry: Oil and gas industry
- Founded: July 19, 1969
- Headquarters: Minato, Tokyo, Japan
- Key people: Mitsuo Hidaka (President & CEO)
- Owner: Mitsui & Co. (73.35%); Ministry of Economy, Trade and Industry (20.03%)
- Parent: Mitsui & Co.
- Subsidiaries: MOEX USA, Corp. MOEX Offshore LLC.
- Website: moeco.co.jp (en)

Mitsui Oil Exploration Co., Ltd. (三井石油開発株式会社, Mitsui Sekiyu Kaihatsu Kabushiki-gaisha) (MOECO) is an oil exploration subsidiary of Mitsui & Co. that specializes in natural gas. It has its headquarters in the Hibiya Central Building in Nishi-Shinbashi, Minato, Tokyo.

It was one of 17 Mitsui companies that were spun off on July 19, 1969.

Its core areas are Thailand, where it drills principally in the Gulf of Thailand in conjunction with Chevron, and Vietnam and Cambodia. As of March 31, 2010 Mitsui & Co. owns 73.35% of the company. The Ministry of Economy, Trade and Industry owns 20.03%. Mitsuo Hidaka is the President & Chief Executive Officer.

== United States operations ==
In the United States Mitsui's subsidiary is MOEX USA Corp and is headquartered in 9 Greenway Plaza in Houston.

In September 2007 it established subsidiary MOEX Offshore 2007 LLC which entered into a partnership with BP for drilling in the Gulf of Mexico. On April 20, 2010, its rig the Deepwater Horizon exploded and sank, causing a massive oil spill. In May, 2011, MOEX Offshore, having had a 10% stake in the Deepwater Horizon through a subsidiary, agreed to pay US$1.07 billion to settle BP claims against it over the accident. Some analysts had thought BP would realize a larger settlement from MOEX but there was also relief to have a first step toward resolving the multiple claims.

In February 2010, through subsidiary Mitsui E&P USA LLC ("MEPUSA") it acquired 32.5% of Anadarko Petroleum's interest in the Marcellus Shale gas project in Pennsylvania (thereby acquiring 15.5% interest in the entire project lease and approximately 100,000 acres (40,469 ha) of land).
