= Ocean Therapy Solutions =

U.S. company making centrifuge pumps for oceanic oil spill cleanup

Ocean Therapy Solutions (OTS) is a company owned by actor Kevin Costner. He acquired the company from the United States government for US$24 million in 1995. The company specializes in developing centrifugal oil-water separators.

== Company ==
After the Exxon Valdez oil spill in 1989, Costner wanted to find a new way to separate oil from water, so he acquired the company. He found it difficult to promote its products, until BP placed an order for several of the company's devices in the aftermath of the Deepwater Horizon oil spill.

OTS's largest machine, the V20, can clean up to 210,000 US gallons (790,000 L) of oily water per day. On July 8, 2010, OTS reported it had 9 centrifuges deployed in the Gulf of Mexico, with 23 additional machines under construction and scheduled for shipment to Louisiana by the end of August 2010.

The machines developed by the company were of little commercial interest until the Deepwater Horizon oil spill, when BP took six of the machines for testing in late May 2010. On June 9, that order was expanded to 32 of the oil-water separation devices.

== Lawsuit ==
Stephen Baldwin and Spyridon Contogouris (plaintiffs) had a joint agreement to market the technology. They filed a lawsuit in the Louisiana District Court claiming securities fraud and misrepresentation in the amount of $10.64 million. The suit claims that Costner held a meeting with BP without notifying plaintiffs. At that meeting, OTS sold BP $52 million worth of product, receiving an $18 million deposit. Costner is then alleged to have used portions of the deposit to buy out plaintiffs shares before they were made aware of the BP purchase, thus cutting them out of the profits from the $52 million sale. Baldwin and Contogouris allege they were misled by Costner into believing BP had no interest in the technology, thus persuading them to accept Costner's lowball offer for their shares. Plaintiffs receipts from their share sales totaled just under $2 million - $1.4 million to Baldwin and $500,000 to Contogouris. On June 15, 2012, the jury ruled in favor of Costner, giving Baldwin and Contogouris nothing.

== See also ==
- John W. Houghtaling II
