= Cementing equipment =

Equipment used to seal walls of bore holes

Oil well cementing equipment are essential for oil and gas exploration and are required oilfield equipment when drilling a well.

Casing pipe will be installed at various depths while drilling. It is held in place by cement, which also provides zone isolation. Casing is run to protect the wellbore from fluids, pressures and wellbore stability problems. Down-hole equipment such as Centralizers and Turbolizers are used to ensure satisfactory zone isolation is obtained. Float Shoes and Collars (float valves) prevent backflow after the cement has been pumped into place.

== Centralizers, turbolizers, and scratchers ==
Devices fitted with hinged collars and bow springs help keep the casing or liner in the center of the wellbore to help ensure efficient placement of a cement sheath around the casing string. If casing strings are cemented off-center, there is a high risk that a channel of drilling fluid or contaminated cement will be left where the casing contacts the formation, creating an imperfect seal.

Turbolizers have added fins to "stir" up the drilling fluid and cement to keep the flow turbulent in order to make sure the cement flows all the way around the casing in order to prevent channeling.

Scratchers use metal wires to scrape mud cake off permeable zones to help obtain a solid cement column.

There are four types of centralizers: bow-spring, rigid, semi-rigid, and mold-on. Bow-spring centralizers consist of an ease of passage way through narrow hole sections with expansion in targeted locations. Rigid centralizers are made up of solid steel bars or cast iron, with a fixed blade height that are sized to fit specific casing or hole sizes. Semi-rigid centralizers are composed of double crested bows, providing restoring forces that exceed standards set forth in the API specifications. Mold-on centralizers are able to be applied directly to the casing surface. Its blade length, angle and spacing can be designed to fit specific well applications, especially for the close tolerance annulus.

== Float shoe ==
A rounded profile float shoe with an integral check valve attached to the bottom of a casing string prevents reverse flow, or U-tubing, of cement slurry from the annulus into the casing or flow of wellbore fluids into the casing string as it is run. The float shoe also guides the casing toward the center of the hole to minimize hitting rock ledges or washouts as the casing is run into the wellbore. By "floating" casing in, hook weight is reduced. With controlled or partial fill-up as the string is run, the casing string can be floated into position, precluding the need for the rig to carry the entire weight of the casing string. The outer portions of the float shoe are made of steel and generally match the casing size and threads, although not necessarily the casing grade. The inside (including the external taper) is usually made of cement or thermoplastic, since this material must be drilled out if the well is to be deepened beyond the casing point.

Guide shoes are a variant of a float shoe without a check valve.

== Float collar ==
A float collar is installed near the bottom of the casing string. Cement plugs land on it during the primary cementing operation, thus retaining inside the casing a small portion of the cement slurry that may have become contaminated as the top plug scrapes the inside of the casing. It is similar to a float shoe; often both are used for redundancy. The internal check valves may be flapper type or spring-loaded balls.

The check-valve assembly fixed within the float collar prevents flow back of the cement slurry when pumping is stopped. Without a float collar or float shoe, the cement slurry placed in the annulus could U-tube, or reverse flow back into the casing. The greater density of cement slurries than the displacement mud inside the casing causes the U-tube effect.

== Stage collar ==
Stage Collars provide a means for cement slurry to be displaced higher in the annulus immediately following the primary cement job. A series of differently sized rubber plugs pumped down inside the casing open and then later close the sliding valves.

== Cementing plug ==
A rubber plug used to separate the cement slurry from other fluids, reducing contamination and maintaining predictable slurry performance. Two types of cementing plug are typically used on a cementing operation. The bottom plug is launched ahead of the cement slurry to minimize contamination by fluids inside the casing prior to cementing. A diaphragm in the plug body ruptures to allow the cement slurry to pass through after the plug reaches the landing collar. The top plug has a solid body that provides positive indication of contact with the landing collar and bottom plug through an increase in pump pressure.
