= Centrifugal water–oil separator =

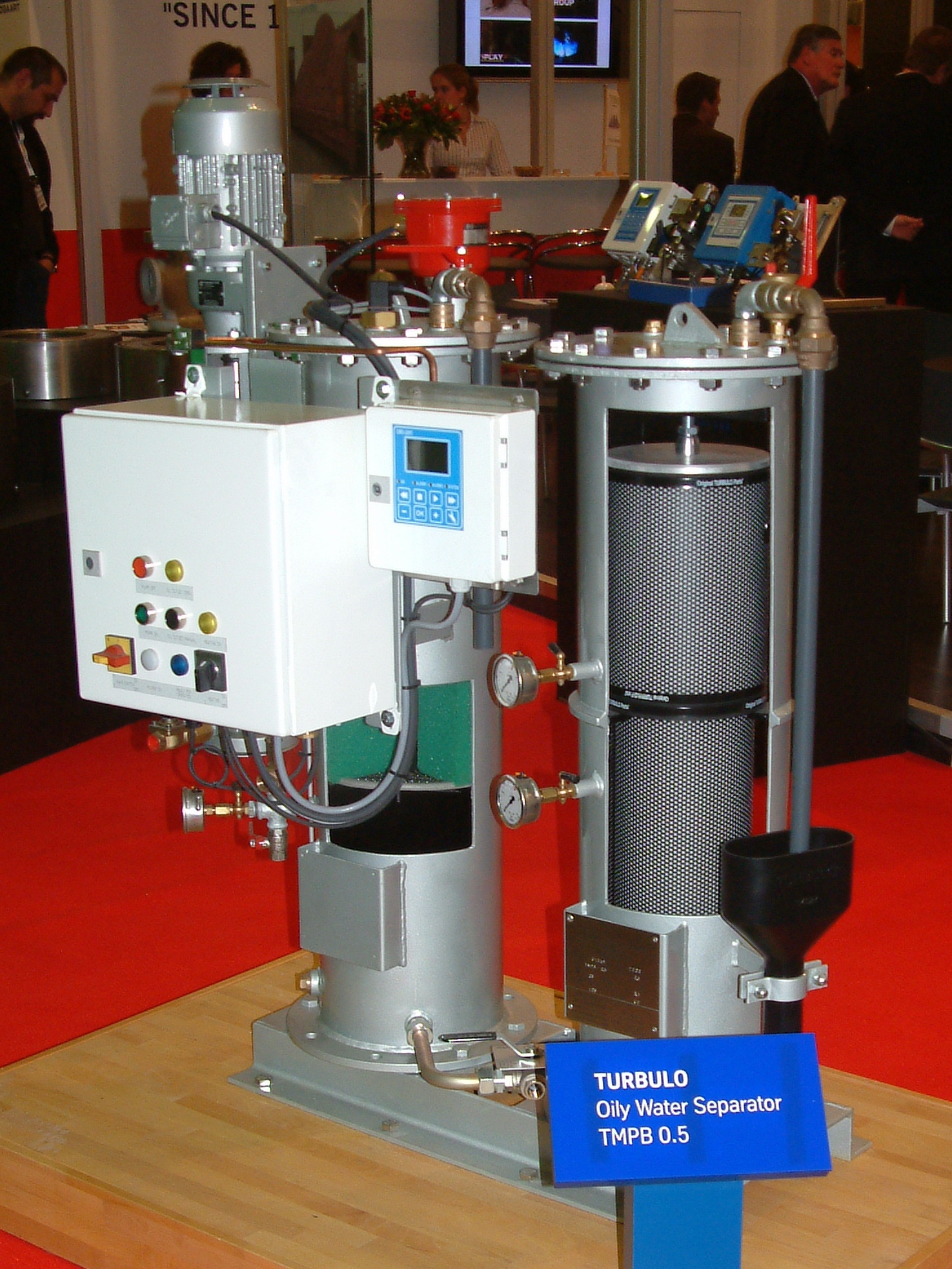
Oil-water separator

A centrifugal water–oil separator, centrifugal oil–water separator or centrifugal liquid–liquid separator is a device designed to separate oil and water by centrifugation. It generally contains a cylindrical container that rotates inside a larger stationary container. The denser liquid, usually water, accumulates at the periphery of the rotating container and is collected from the side of the device, whereas the less dense liquid, usually oil, accumulates at the rotation axis and is collected from the center.

Centrifugal oil–water separators are used for waste water processing and for cleanup of oil spills on water bodies.

Centrifugal oil–water separators are also used for filtering diesel and lubricating oils by removing waste particles and impurities.

== Mechanism ==
A mix of oil and water is pumped constantly into a cone-shaped separating apparatus at an angle, which creates a spinning vortex. The filtration is a result of the force balance that occurs on fluids in a vortex. High-density liquids will move to the outside, along with any contaminant, displacing the lower-density liquids to the inside (center of rotation). Water, being the more dense liquid, sits on the outside and is removed through a discharge outlet. Any segregated oil can now safely be recovered through a suction orifice at the center. The process will continue to function in this fashion as long as sufficient oil is added to maintain coverage of the suction orifice.

== Comparison to other types of separators ==
There are other types of separators that use gravitational forces to separate mixtures, but these other types of forces are not as strong as the centrifugal force in the centrifugal separator. Other types of separators are coalescing plate pack separators and petrol interceptor separators.

Coalescing plate pack separators work very differently from centrifugal separators. With the plate packs, water is fed into the separator through gravity through the inlet pipe, then the mixture is spread evenly through the separation chamber where the coalescing plate packs are. In the plate packs the oil will rise because of their buoyancy and coalesce on the underside of the plates and form globules of oil that rise to the surface. From there the waste oil globules go into the clean water chamber and are discharged through the lower portion of the separator.

With the interceptors the dirty water mixture enters the first tank of the interceptor where that tanks builds up hydrocarbons and other hazardous material in a layer. Then comes the second and third tanks of the interceptor that are all connected through pipes called "dip pipes" which don't allow the hydrocarbons and other contaminants to pass through. The same process that happened in the first tank will happen in the second and third tanks just with less and less contaminants.

In a centrifugal oil and water separator, the force of gravity is one-thousand times greater that of the coalescing plate pack separator or the petrol interceptor, so the separation is much greater. Not only is the force of separation greater, but there are fewer working parts so maintenance is much easier and cheaper.

More advantages of the centrifugal oil and water separator include compact equipment size, versatility, ease of use, low cost, and high performance.

=== Disadvantages ===
Centrifugal oil and water separators do have their disadvantages. One known disadvantage of these separators is that they tend to have low powered suction. For example, when the pump end is dry and the impeller is rotating at high speeds, it is simply not powerful enough to lift the oily water mixture into the separator. For this reason, these separators must always be primed before use.

=== Design and features ===
==== Materials and metals used ====
The bowl of the separator is generally made up of stainless steel, brass, and bronze. The structural parts are usually where the stainless steel is and the parts on the inside that come into contact with mixtures are either made of bronze or brass depending on the mixture going through the centrifugal separator. The housing and gearbox of the separator is made of aluminum or stainless steel and cast iron. The gearbox in particular is cast iron with stainless steel coating it.

==== Transmission ====
The rotation of the separator bowl is usually powered by an electric motor, the power of which is transferred to the bowl by a transmission which may include a clutch, flexible coupling and worm gear or a centrifugal clutch connected to the vertical driving device with a flat belt.

==== Suction and discharging of the liquids ====
The suction process of the separator takes place as stationary feed pipe suctions the mixture liquid into the cone-shaped pipe that feeds into the vortex. After the filtration of the liquids occur the unwanted contaminants are discharged either through an overflow or through one or two centripetal pumps. In case of a (combined) clarifier the solids are trapped at the outer edge of the bowl and will be discharged at intervals, except for purifiers in use for very clean liquids which may not have an opening mechanism and need to be cleaned manually.

== See also ==
- Centrifuge
