= Mary Landry =

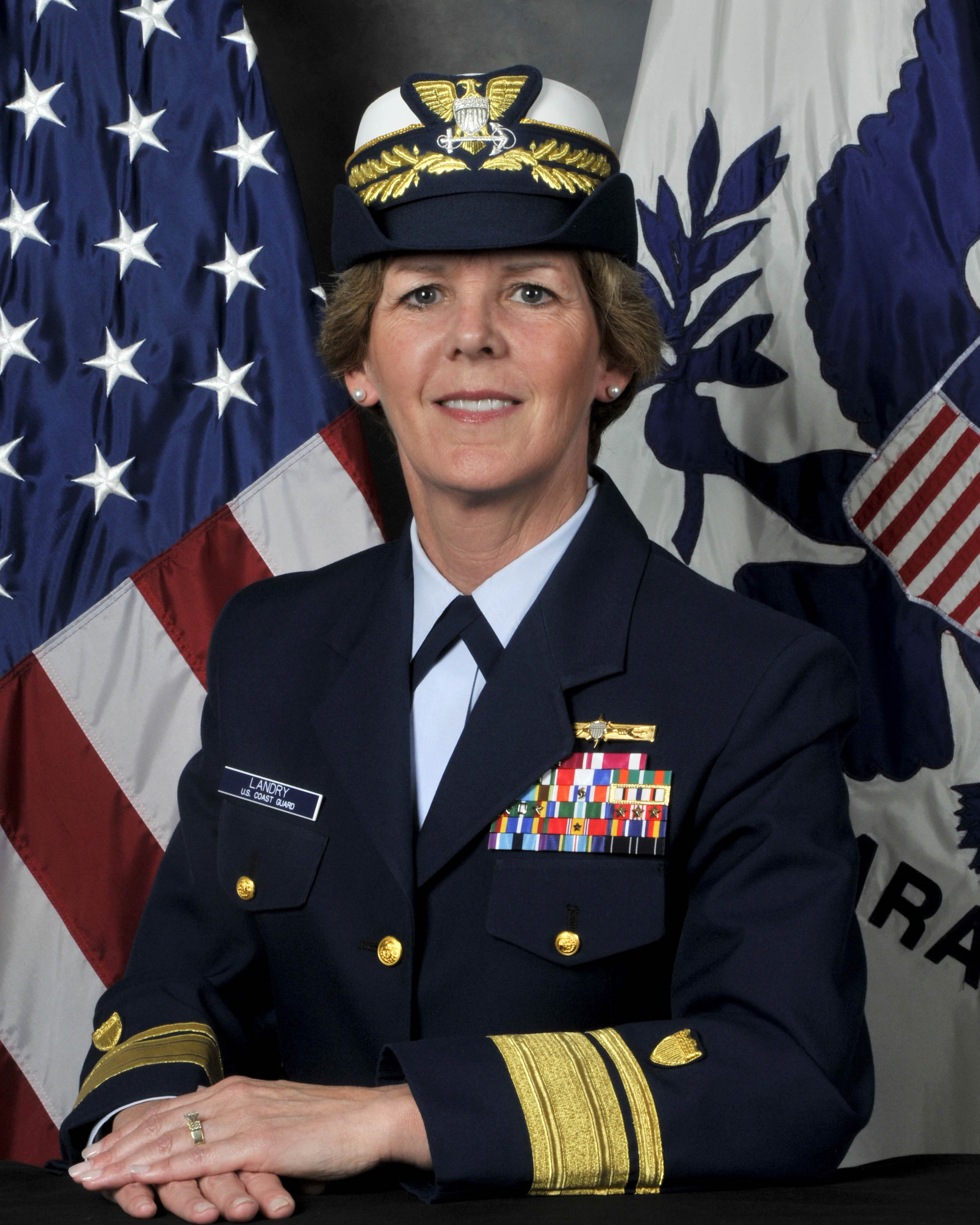
Mary E. Landry, Director of Incident Management, USCG

Mary E. Landry is an American disaster-management official and retired rear admiral of the United States Coast Guard.

In April 2012, Landry became the inaugural Director of Incident Management and Preparedness at the Coast Guard's headquarters. She is responsible for establishing, developing, and implementing all hazards incident management goals, strategies, policies, and doctrine to meet Coast Guard responsibilities in incident preparedness and response.

Prior to joining the Coast Guard’s Senior Executive Service, Landry served on active duty in the Coast Guard retiring at the rank of rear admiral in 2011. As a flag officer she served as Director of Governmental and Public Affairs at Coast Guard Headquarters in Washington, D.C. Her subsequent tour was as the Commander of the Eighth Coast Guard District and Commander of Task Force 189.8, headquartered in New Orleans. As District Commander, Landry was responsible for U.S. Coast Guard operations covering 26 states, more than 1,200 miles of coastline and 10,300 miles of inland waterways from Florida to Mexico and including the entire navigable lengths of the Mississippi, Ohio, Missouri, Illinois, and Tennessee river systems. During this tour she served as Federal on Scene Coordinator in the Deepwater Horizon oil spill, where she worked closely with BP officials to allow multiple exemptions to spray thousands of gallons of Corexit during the BP Horizon oil spill ignoring EPA directives and oversaw the service’s response to the 2011 Mississippi River Valley floods.

Landry’s military commendations and civilian honors include the Distinguished Service Medal, the Legion of Merit (three awards), the University of Rhode Island Distinguished Achievement Award, the Seamen’s Church Institute River Bells Distinguished Service award, the U.S. Women in Shipping and Trading Association Personality of the Year 2011, New Orleans Magazine 2011 Top Female Achiever, and an Honorary Doctoral Degree from Hilbert College. She has an undergraduate degree from SUNY Buffalo, a master's degree in management from Webster University, and a master's of marine affairs from the University of Rhode Island. She is also a graduate of the Harvard National Security Fellowship.

== See also ==
- List of female United States military generals and flag officers
