= Blowout (well drilling) =

Uncontrolled release of crude oil and/or natural gas from a well

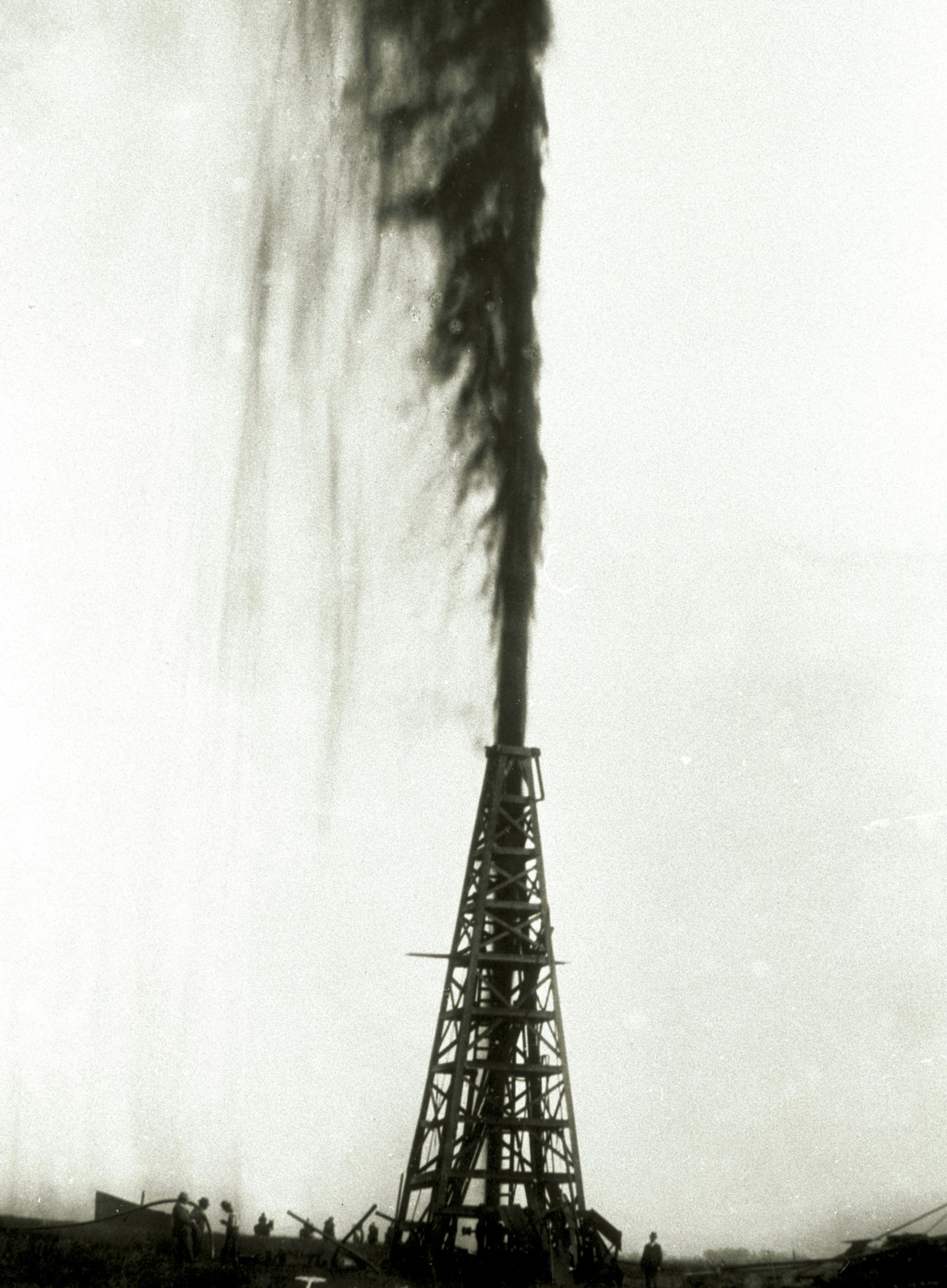
The Lucas Gusher at Spindletop, Texas (1901)

A blowout is the uncontrolled release of crude oil and/or natural gas from an oil well or gas well after pressure control systems have failed. Modern wells have blowout preventers intended to prevent such an occurrence. An accidental spark during a blowout can lead to a catastrophic oil or gas fire.

Prior to the advent of pressure control equipment in the 1920s, the uncontrolled release of oil and gas from a well while drilling was common and was known as an oil gusher, gusher or wild well.

== History ==
Gushers were an icon of oil exploration during the late 19th and early 20th centuries. During that era, the simple drilling techniques, such as cable-tool drilling, and the lack of blowout preventers meant that drillers could not control high-pressure reservoirs. When these high-pressure zones were breached, the oil or natural gas would travel up the well at a high rate, forcing out the drill string and creating a gusher. A well which began as a gusher was said to have "blown in": for instance, the Lakeview Gusher blew in in 1910. These uncapped wells could produce large amounts of oil, often shooting 200 feet (61 m) or higher into the air. A blowout primarily composed of natural gas was known as a gas gusher.

Despite being symbols of new-found wealth, gushers were dangerous and wasteful. They killed workmen involved in drilling, destroyed equipment, and coated the landscape with thousands of barrels of oil; additionally, the explosive concussion released by the well when it pierces an oil/gas reservoir has been responsible for a number of oilmen losing their hearing entirely; standing too near to the drilling rig at the moment it drills into the oil reservoir is extremely hazardous. The impact on wildlife is very hard to quantify, but can only be estimated to be mild in the most optimistic models—realistically, the ecological impact is estimated by scientists across the ideological spectrum to be severe, profound, and lasting.

To complicate matters further, the free flowing oil was—and is—in danger of igniting. One dramatic account of a blowout and fire reads,

With a roar like a hundred express trains racing across the countryside, the well blew out, spewing oil in all directions. The derrick simply evaporated. Casings wilted like lettuce out of water, as heavy machinery writhed and twisted into grotesque shapes in the blazing inferno.

The development of rotary drilling techniques where the density of the drilling fluid is sufficient to overcome the downhole pressure of a newly penetrated zone meant that gushers became avoidable. However, if the fluid density was not adequate or fluids were lost to the formation, then there was still a significant risk of a well blowout.

In 1924 the first successful blowout preventer was brought to market. The BOP valve affixed to the wellhead could be closed in the event of drilling into a high pressure zone, and the well fluids contained. Well control techniques could be used to regain control of the well. As the technology developed, blowout preventers became standard equipment, and gushers became a thing of the past.

In the modern petroleum industry, uncontrollable wells became known as blowouts and are comparatively rare. There has been significant improvement in technology, well control techniques, and personnel training which has helped to prevent their occurring. From 1976 to 1981, only 21 blowouts occurred.

=== Notable gushers ===
- A blowout in 1815 resulted from an attempt to drill for salt rather than for oil. Joseph Eichar and his team were digging west of the town of Wooster, Ohio, US along Killbuck Creek, when they struck oil. In a written retelling by Eichar's daughter, Eleanor, the strike produced "a spontaneous outburst, which shot up high as the tops of the highest trees!"
- Oil drillers struck a number of gushers near Oil City, Pennsylvania, US in 1861. The most famous was the Little & Merrick well, in Rouseville, which began gushing oil on 17 April 1861. The spectacle of the fountain of oil flowing out at about 3,000 barrels (480 m^{3}) per day had drawn a significant crowd, some of whom stood in the raining oil. That same evening, the rig caught fire, killing between 15 and 19 people, and injuring at least 13 more. Other early gushers in northwest Pennsylvania were the Phillips #2 (4,000 barrels (640 m^{3}) per day) in September 1861, and the Woodford well (3,000 barrels (480 m^{3}) per day) in December 1861.
- The Shaw Gusher in Oil Springs, Ontario, was Canada's first oil gusher. On January 16, 1862, it shot oil from over 60 metres (200 ft) below ground to above the treetops at a rate of 3,000 barrels (480 m^{3}) per day, triggering the oil boom in Lambton County.
- Lucas Gusher at Spindletop in Beaumont, Texas, US in 1901 flowed at 100,000 barrels (16,000 m^{3}) per day at its peak, but soon slowed and was capped within nine days. The well tripled U.S. oil production overnight and marked the start of the Texas oil industry.
- Masjed Soleiman, Iran, in 1908 marked the first major oil strike recorded in the Middle East.
- Dos Bocas in the State of Veracruz, Mexico, was a famous 1908 Mexican blowout that formed a large crater. It leaked oil from the main reservoir for many years, continuing even after 1938 (when Pemex nationalized the Mexican oil industry).
- Lakeview Gusher on the Midway-Sunset Oil Field in Kern County, California, US of 1910 is believed to be the largest-ever U.S. gusher. At its peak, more than 100,000 barrels (16,000 m^{3}) of oil per day flowed out, reaching as high as 200 feet (61 m) in the air. It remained uncapped for 18 months, spilling over 9 million barrels (1,400,000 m^{3}) of oil, less than half of which was recovered.
- A short-lived gusher at Alamitos #1 in Signal Hill, California, US in 1921 marked the discovery of the Long Beach Oil Field, one of the most productive oil fields in the world.
- The Barroso 2 well in Cabimas, Venezuela, in December 1922 flowed at around 100,000 barrels (16,000 m^{3}) per day for nine days, plus a large amount of natural gas.
- Baba Gurgur near Kirkuk, Iraq, an oilfield known since antiquity, erupted at a rate of 95,000 barrels (15,100 m^{3}) a day in 1927.
- The Yates #30-A in Pecos County, Texas, US gushing 80 feet through the fifteen-inch casing, produced a world record 204,682 barrels of oil a day from a depth of 1,070 feet on 23 September 1929.
- The Wild Mary Sudik gusher in Oklahoma City, Oklahoma, US in 1930 flowed at a rate of 72,000 barrels (11,400 m^{3}) per day.
- The Daisy Bradford gusher in 1930 marked the discovery of the East Texas Oil Field, the largest oilfield in the contiguous United States.
- The largest known 'wildcat' oil gusher blew near Qom, Iran, on 26 August 1956. The uncontrolled oil gushed to a height of 52 m (171 ft), at a rate of 120,000 barrels (19,000 m^{3}) per day. The gusher was closed after 90 days' work by Bagher Mostofi and Myron Kinley (USA).
- On October 17, 1982, a sour gas well Amoco Dome Brazeau River, 13-12-48-12, being drilled 20 km west of Lodgepole, Alberta blew out. The burning well was finally capped 67 days later by the Texas well-control company Boots & Coots.
- One of the most troublesome gushers happened on 23 June 1985, at well #37 at the Tengiz field in Atyrau, Kazakh SSR, Soviet Union, where the 4,209-metre deep well blew out and the 200-metre high gusher self-ignited two days later. Oil pressure up to 800 atm and high hydrogen sulfide content had led to the gusher being capped only on 27 July 1986. The total volume of erupted material measured at 4.3 million metric tons of oil and 1.7 billion m³ of natural gas, and the burning gusher resulted in 890 tons of various mercaptans and more than 900,000 tons of soot released into the atmosphere.
- Deepwater Horizon explosion: The largest underwater blowout in U.S. history occurred on 20 April 2010, in the Gulf of Mexico at the Macondo Prospect oil field. The blowout caused the explosion of the Deepwater Horizon, a mobile offshore drilling platform owned by Transocean and under lease to BP at the time of the blowout. While the exact volume of oil spilled is unknown, as of June 3, 2010, the United States Geological Survey Flow Rate Technical Group has placed the estimate at between 35,000 to 60,000 barrels (5,600 to 9,500 m^{3}) of crude oil per day.

== Causes ==
=== Reservoir pressure ===
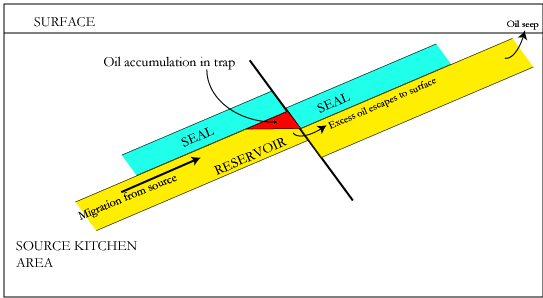
A petroleum trap. An irregularity (the trap) in a layer of impermeable rocks (the seal) retains upward-flowing petroleum, forming a reservoir.

Petroleum or crude oil is a naturally occurring, flammable liquid consisting of a complex mixture of hydrocarbons of various molecular weights, and other organic compounds, found in geologic formations beneath the Earth's surface. Because most hydrocarbons are lighter than rock or water, they often migrate upward and occasionally laterally through adjacent rock layers until either reaching the surface or becoming trapped within porous rocks (known as reservoirs) by impermeable rocks above. When hydrocarbons are concentrated in a trap, an oil field forms, from which the liquid can be extracted by drilling and pumping. The downhole pressure in the rock structures changes depending upon the depth and the characteristics of the source rock. Natural gas (mostly methane) may be present also, usually above the oil within the reservoir, but sometimes dissolved in the oil at reservoir pressure and temperature. Dissolved gas typically comes out of solution as free gas as the pressure is reduced either under controlled production operations or in a kick, or in an uncontrolled blowout. The hydrocarbon in some reservoirs may be essentially all natural gas.

=== Formation kick ===
The downhole fluid pressures are controlled in modern wells through the balancing of the hydrostatic pressure provided by the mud column. Should the balance of the drilling mud pressure be incorrect (i.e., the mud pressure gradient is less than the formation pore pressure gradient), then formation fluids (oil, natural gas, and/or water) can begin to flow into the wellbore and up the annulus (the space between the outside of the drill string and the wall of the open hole or the inside of the casing), and/or inside the drill pipe. This is commonly called a kick. Ideally, mechanical barriers such as blowout preventers (BOPs) can be closed to isolate the well while the hydrostatic balance is regained through circulation of fluids in the well. But if the well is not shut in (common term for the closing of the blow-out preventer), a kick can quickly escalate into a blowout when the formation fluids reach the surface, especially when the influx contains gas that expands rapidly with the reduced pressure as it flows up the wellbore, further decreasing the effective weight of the fluid.

Early warning signs of an impending well kick while drilling are:

- Sudden change in drilling rate;
- Reduction in drillpipe weight;
- Change in pump pressure;
- Change in drilling fluid return rate.

Other warning signs during the drilling operation are:

- Returning mud "cut" by (i.e., contaminated by) gas, oil or water;
- Connection gases, high background gas units, and high bottoms-up gas units detected in the mudlogging unit.

The primary means of detecting a kick while drilling is a relative change in the circulation rate back up to the surface into the mud pits. The drilling crew or mud engineer keeps track of the level in the mud pits and closely monitors the rate of mud returns versus the rate that is being pumped down the drill pipe. Upon encountering a zone of higher pressure than is being exerted by the hydrostatic head of the drilling mud (including the small additional frictional head while circulating) at the bit, an increase in mud return rate would be noticed as the formation fluid influx blends in with the circulating drilling mud. Conversely, if the rate of returns is slower than expected, it means that a certain amount of the mud is being lost to a thief zone somewhere below the last casing shoe. This does not necessarily result in a kick (and may never become one); however, a drop in the mud level might allow influx of formation fluids from other zones if the hydrostatic head is reduced to less than that of a full column of mud.

=== Well control ===
The first response to detecting a kick would be to isolate the wellbore from the surface by activating the blow-out preventers and closing in the well. Then the drilling crew would attempt to circulate in a heavier kill fluid to increase the hydrostatic pressure (sometimes with the assistance of a well control company). In the process, the influx fluids will be slowly circulated out in a controlled manner, taking care not to allow any gas to accelerate up the wellbore too quickly by controlling casing pressure with chokes on a predetermined schedule.

This effect will be minor if the influx fluid is mainly salt water. And with an oil-based drilling fluid it can be masked in the early stages of controlling a kick because gas influx may dissolve into the oil under pressure at depth, only to come out of solution and expand rather rapidly as the influx nears the surface. Once all the contaminant has been circulated out, the shut-in casing pressure should have reached zero.

Capping stacks are used for controlling blowouts. The cap is an open valve that is closed after bolted on.

== Types ==
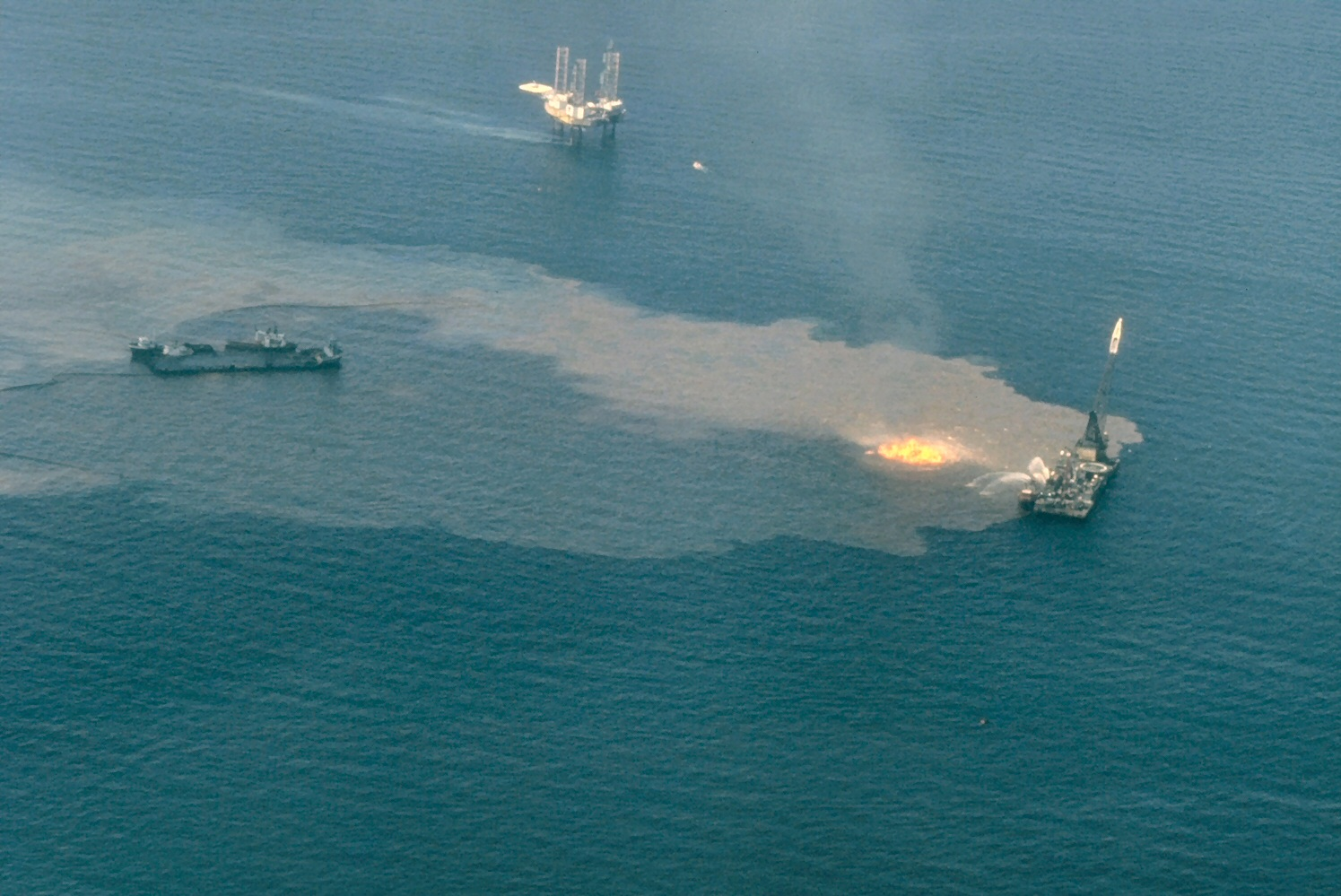
Ixtoc I oil well blowout

Well blowouts can occur during the drilling phase, during well testing, during well completion, during production, or during workover activities.

=== Surface blowouts ===
Blowouts can eject the drill string out of the well, and the force of the escaping fluid can be strong enough to damage the drilling rig. In addition to oil, the output of a well blowout might include natural gas, water, drilling fluid, mud, sand, rocks, and other substances.

Blowouts will often be ignited from sparks from rocks being ejected, or simply from heat generated by friction. A well control company then will need to extinguish the well fire or cap the well, and replace the casing head and other surface equipment. If the flowing gas contains poisonous hydrogen sulfide, the oil operator might decide to ignite the stream to convert this to less hazardous substances.

Sometimes blowouts can be so forceful that they cannot be directly brought under control from the surface, particularly if there is so much energy in the flowing zone that it does not deplete significantly over time. In such cases, other wells (called relief wells) may be drilled to intersect the well or pocket, in order to allow kill-weight fluids to be introduced at depth. When first drilled in the 1930s relief wells were drilled to inject water into the main drill well hole. Contrary to what might be inferred from the term, such wells generally are not used to help relieve pressure using multiple outlets from the blowout zone.

=== Subsea blowouts ===
Macondo-1 well blowout on the Deepwater Horizon rig, 21 April 2010

The two main causes of a subsea blowout are equipment failures and imbalances with encountered subsurface reservoir pressure. Subsea wells have pressure control equipment located on the seabed or between the riser pipe and drilling platform. Blowout preventers (BOPs) are the primary safety devices designed to maintain control of geologically driven well pressures. They contain hydraulic-powered cut-off mechanisms to stop the flow of hydrocarbons in the event of a loss of well control.

Even with blowout prevention equipment and processes in place, operators must be prepared to respond to a blowout should one occur. Before drilling a well, a detailed well construction design plan, an Oil Spill Response Plan as well as a Well Containment Plan must be submitted, reviewed and approved by BSEE and is contingent upon access to adequate well containment resources in accordance to NTL 2010-N10.

The Deepwater Horizon well blowout in the Gulf of Mexico in April 2010 occurred at a 5,000 feet (1,500 m) water depth. Current blowout response capabilities in the U.S. Gulf of Mexico meet capture and process rates of 130,000 barrels of fluid per day and a gas handling capacity of 220 million cubic feet per day at depths through 10,000 feet.

=== Underground blowouts ===
An underground blowout is a special situation where fluids from high pressure zones flow uncontrolled to lower pressure zones within the wellbore. Usually this is from deeper higher pressure zones to shallower lower pressure formations. There may be no escaping fluid flow at the wellhead. However, the formation(s) receiving the influx can become overpressured, a possibility that future drilling plans in the vicinity must consider.

== Blowout control companies ==
Myron M. Kinley was a pioneer in fighting oil well fires and blowouts. He developed many patents and designs for the tools and techniques of oil firefighting. His father, Karl T. Kinley, attempted to extinguish an oil well fire with the help of a massive explosion—a method still in common use for fighting oil fires. Myron and Karl Kinley first successfully used explosives to extinguish an oil well fire in 1913. Kinley would later form the M. M. Kinley Company in 1923. Asger "Boots" Hansen and Edward Owen "Coots" Matthews also begin their careers under Kinley.

Paul N. "Red" Adair joined the M. M. Kinley Company in 1946, and worked 14 years with Myron Kinley before starting his own company, Red Adair Co., Inc., in 1959.

Red Adair Co. has helped in controlling offshore blowouts, including:

- CATCO fire in the Gulf of Mexico in 1959.
- "The Devil's Cigarette Lighter" in 1962 in Gassi Touil, Algeria, in the Sahara Desert.
- The Ixtoc I oil spill in Mexico's Bay of Campeche in 1979.
- The Piper Alpha disaster in the North Sea in 1988.
- The Kuwaiti oil fires following the Gulf War in 1991.

The 1968 American film Hellfighters, which starred John Wayne, is about a group of oil well firefighters, based loosely on Adair's life; Adair, Hansen, and Matthews served as technical advisors on the film.

In 1994, Adair retired and sold his company to Global Industries. Management of Adair's company left and created International Well Control (IWC). In 1997, they would buy the company Boots & Coots International Well Control, Inc., which was founded by Hansen and Matthews in 1978.

== Methods of quenching ==
=== Subsea well containment ===
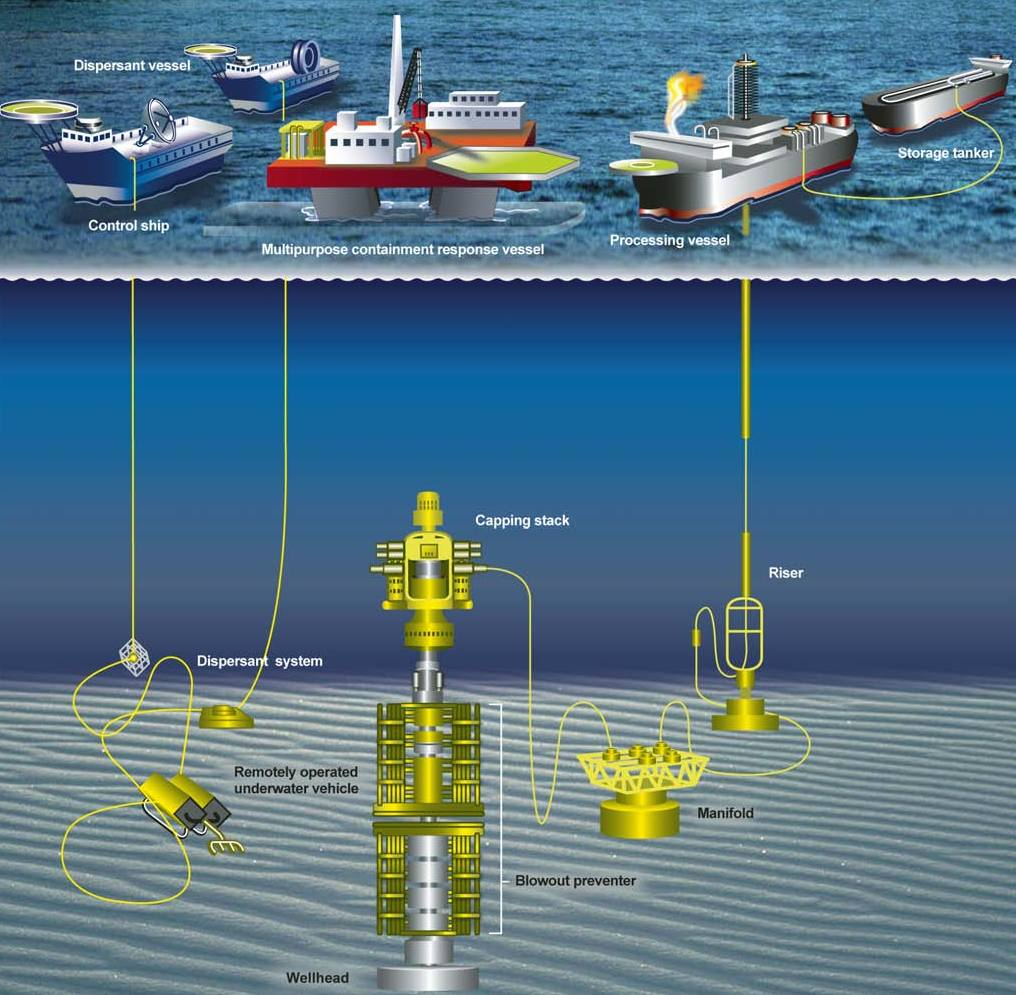
Government Accountability Office diagram showing subsea well containment operations

After the Macondo-1 blowout on the Deepwater Horizon, the offshore industry collaborated with government regulators to develop a framework to respond to future subsea incidents. As a result, all energy companies operating in the deep-water U.S. Gulf of Mexico must submit an OPA 90 required Oil Spill Response Plan with the addition of a Regional Containment Demonstration Plan prior to any drilling activity. In the event of a subsea blowout, these plans are immediately activated, drawing on some of the equipment and processes effectively used to contain the Deepwater Horizon well as others that have been developed in its aftermath.

In order to regain control of a subsea well, the Responsible Party would first secure the safety of all personnel on board the rig and then begin a detailed evaluation of the incident site. Remotely operated underwater vehicles (ROVs) would be dispatched to inspect the condition of the wellhead, blowout preventer (BOP) and other subsea well equipment. The debris removal process would begin immediately to provide clear access for a capping stack.

Once lowered and latched on the wellhead, a capping stack uses stored hydraulic pressure to close a hydraulic ram and stop the flow of hydrocarbons. If shutting in the well could introduce unstable geological conditions in the wellbore, a cap and flow procedure would be used to contain hydrocarbons and safely transport them to a surface vessel.

The Responsible Party works in collaboration with BSEE and the United States Coast Guard to oversee response efforts, including source control, recovering discharged oil and mitigating environmental impact.

Several not-for-profit organizations provide a solution to effectively contain a subsea blowout. HWCG LLC and Marine Well Containment Company operate within the U.S. Gulf of Mexico waters, while cooperatives like Oil Spill Response Limited offer support for international operations.

=== Use of nuclear explosions ===
On Sep. 30, 1966, the Soviet Union experienced blowouts on five natural gas wells in Urtabulak gas field, an area about 80 kilometers from Bukhara, Uzbekistan. It was claimed in Komsomloskaya Pravda that after years of burning uncontrollably they were able to stop them entirely. The Soviets lowered a specially made 30 kiloton nuclear physics package into a 6-kilometre (20,000 ft) borehole drilled 25 to 50 metres (82 to 164 ft) away from the original (rapidly leaking) well. A nuclear explosive was deemed necessary because conventional explosives both lacked the necessary power and would also require a great deal more space underground. When the device was detonated, it crushed the original pipe that was carrying the gas from the deep reservoir to the surface and vitrified the surrounding rock. This caused the leak and fire at the surface to cease within approximately one minute of the explosion, and proved to be a permanent solution. An attempt on a similar well was not as successful. Other tests were for such experiments as oil extraction enhancement (Stavropol, 1969) and the creation of gas storage reservoirs (Orenburg, 1970).

== Notable offshore well blowouts ==
Data from industry information.

Year	Rig Name	Rig Owner	Type	Damage / details
1955	S-44	Chevron Corporation	Sub Recessed pontoons	Blowout and fire. Returned to service.
1959	C. T. Thornton	Reading & Bates	Jackup	Blowout and fire damage.
1964	C. P. Baker	Reading & Bates	Drill barge	Blowout in Gulf of Mexico, vessel capsized, 22 killed.
1965	Trion	Royal Dutch Shell	Jackup	Destroyed by blowout.
1965	Paguro	SNAM	Jackup	Destroyed by blowout and fire.
1968	Little Bob	Coral	Jackup	Blowout and fire, killed 7.
1969	Wodeco III	Floor drilling	Drilling barge	Blowout
1969	Sedco 135G	Sedco Inc	Semi-submersible	Blowout damage
1969	Rimrick Tidelands	ODECO	Submersible	Blowout in Gulf of Mexico
1970	Stormdrill III	Storm Drilling	Jackup	Blowout and fire damage.
1970	Discoverer III	Offshore Co.	Drillship	Blowout (S. China Seas)
1971	Big John	Atwood Oceanics	Drill barge	Blowout and fire.
1971	Wodeco II	Floor Drilling	Drill barge	Blowout and fire off Peru, 7 killed.
1972	J. Storm II	Marine Drilling Co.	Jackup	Blowout in Gulf of Mexico
1972	M. G. Hulme	Reading & Bates	Jackup	Blowout and capsize in Java Sea.
1972	Rig 20	Transworld Drilling	Jackup	Blowout in Gulf of Martaban.
1973	Mariner I	Santa Fe Drilling	Semi-sub	Blowout off Trinidad, 3 killed.
1975	Mariner II	Santa Fe Drilling	Semi-submersible	Lost BOP during blowout.
1975	J. Storm II	Marine Drilling Co.	Jackup	Blowout in Gulf of Mexico.
1976	Petrobras III	Petrobras	Jackup	No info.
1976	W. D. Kent	Reading & Bates	Jackup	Damage while drilling relief well.
1977	Maersk Explorer	Maersk Drilling	Jackup	Blowout and fire in North Sea
1977	Ekofisk Bravo	Phillips Petroleum	Platform	Blowout during well workover.
1978	Scan Bay	Scan Drilling	Jackup	Blowout and fire in the Persion Gulf.
1979	Salenergy II	Salen Offshore	Jackup	Blowout in Gulf of Mexico
1979	Sedco 135	Sedco Drilling	Semi-submersible	Blowout and fire in Bay of Campeche Ixtoc I well.
1980	Sedco 135C	Sedco Drilling	Semi-submersible	Blowout and fire of Nigeria.
1980	Discoverer 534	Offshore Co.	Drillship	Gas escape caught fire.
1980	Ron Tappmeyer	Reading & Bates	Jackup	Blowout in Persian Gulf, 5 killed.
1980	Nanhai II	People's Republic of China	Jackup	Blowout of Hainan Island.
1980	Maersk Endurer	Maersk Drilling	Jackup	Blowout in Red Sea, 2 killed.
1980	Ocean King	ODECO	Jackup	Blowout and fire in Gulf of Mexico, 5 killed.
1980	Marlin 14	Marlin Drilling	Jackup	Blowout in Gulf of Mexico
1981	Penrod 50	Penrod Drilling	Submersible	Blowout and fire in Gulf of Mexico.
1984	Plataforma Central de Enchova	Petrobras	fixed platform	Blowout and fire in Campos Basin, Rio de Janeiro, Brazil, 37 fatalities.
1985	West Vanguard	Smedvig	Semi-submersible	Shallow gas blowout and fire in Norwegian sea, 1 fatality.
1981	Petromar V	Petromar	Drillship	Gas blowout and capsize in S. China seas.
1983	Bull Run	Atwood Oceanics	Tender	Oil and gas blowout Dubai, 3 fatalities.
1988	Ocean Odyssey	Diamond Offshore Drilling	Semi-submersible	Gas blowout at BOP and fire in the UK North Sea, 1 killed.
1988	Plataforma Central de Enchova	Petrobras	fixed platform	Blowout and fire in Campos Basin, Rio de Janeiro, Brazil, no fatality, platform entirely destroyed.
1989	Al Baz	Santa Fe	Jackup	Shallow gas blowout and fire in Nigeria, 5 killed.
1993	M. Naqib Khalid	Naqib Co.	Naqib Drilling	fire and explosion. Returned to service.
1993	Actinia	Transocean	Semi-submersible	Sub-sea blowout in Vietnam.
2001	Ensco 51	Ensco	Jackup	Gas blowout and fire, Gulf of Mexico, no casualties
2002	Arabdrill 19	Arabian Drilling Co.	Jackup	Structural collapse, blowout, fire and sinking.
2004	Adriatic IV	Global Santa Fe	Jackup	Blowout and fire at Temsah platform, Mediterranean Sea
2007	Usumacinta	PEMEX	Jackup	Storm forced rig to move, causing well blowout on Kab 101 platform, 22 killed.
2009	West Atlas / Montara	Seadrill	Jackup / Platform	Blowout and fire on rig and platform in Australia.
2010	Deepwater Horizon	Transocean	Semi-submersible	Blowout and fire on the rig, subsea well blowout, killed 11 in explosion.
2010	Vermilion Block 380	Mariner Energy	Platform	Blowout and fire, 13 survivors, 1 injured.
2012	KS Endeavour	KS Energy Services	Jack-Up	Blowout and fire on the rig, collapsed, killed 2 in explosion.
2012	Elgin platform	Total	Platform	Blowout and prolonged sour gas release, no injuries.

== See also ==
- Drilling fluid
- Drilling rig
- List of oil spills
- Oil platform
- Oil well
- Oil well control
- Oil well fire
- Petroleum geology
- Underbalanced drilling
