= Mid-Continent oil province =

Oil-rich area in the United States

Coordinates: 33°N 95°W

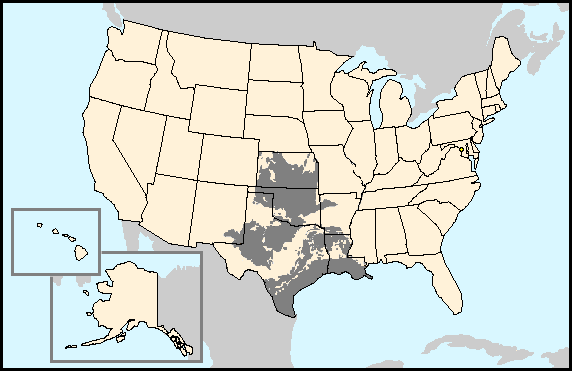
Map of the Mid-continent oil field

The Mid-continent oil field is a broad area containing hundreds of oil fields in the U.S. states of Arkansas, Kansas, Louisiana, New Mexico, Oklahoma and Texas. The area, which consists of various geological strata and diverse trap types, was discovered and exploited during the first half of the 20th century. Most of the crude oil found in the onshore Mid-continent oil field is considered to be of the mixed base or intermediate type (a mix of paraffin base and asphalt base crude oil types).

== History ==
The first commercially successful oil well drilled in the area was the Norman No. 1 near Neodesha, Kansas, on November 28, 1892. The successes that followed of the Nellie Johnstone No. 1 at Bartlesville, Oklahoma in 1897, Spindletop at Beaumont, Texas in 1901, and Oklahoma's Ida Glenn No. 1 at the Glenn Pool Oil Reserve in 1905, demonstrated the existence of a large oil field in the central and southwestern United States. It became known as the Mid-continent oil field. Continued drilling found many other oil fields and pools within the Mid-continent, both large and small.

Historically the area around Glenpool, Oklahoma, has produced more oil than any other area in the United States, and until the discovery of oil in the Middle East, it was the largest known oil reserve in the world. The Texas Railroad Commission estimates that the Texas reserves alone were 190 billion barrels (3.0×10^{10} m^{3}) of oil including the little more than 60 billion (10 km^{3}) already produced.

Laws in the early days gave the oil flowing from the well-head to the owners of the well, prompting nearby property owners and lease holders to drill as many wells as possible to ensure they received the profits for the oil under their land. This led to rapid depletion of the resources and the immediate fall of oil prices. Also, the resulting influx of thousands of oil field workers led to wild growth of nearby boom towns and the lawlessness that accompanied them. The states eventually succeeded in regulating the industry and passing laws for the equitable distribution of oil royalties.

Oil operators, in addition to continued exploration, use a variety of techniques to increase production, including deep wells, injection wells, etc. Natural gas, which in the early days was vented to the atmosphere or burned off, now accounts for a large percentage of the exploration efforts and profitability of the petroleum industry in the Mid-continent.

== Proven oil reserves ==
- Texas: 20,173 million barrels (3.2073×10^{9} m^{3})—Ranked 1st in the U.S.
- New Mexico: 6,572 million barrels (1.0449×10^{9} m^{3})—Ranked 2nd in the U.S.
- Oklahoma: 1,606 million barrels (255,300,000 m^{3})—Ranked 5th in the U.S.
- Louisiana: 451 million barrels (71,700,000 m^{3})
- Kansas: 270 million barrels (43,000,000 m^{3})
- Arkansas: 32 million barrels (5,100,000 m^{3})

Reserves data as of 12/31/2023 per EIA

== Historic oil fields within the Mid-continent oil field ==
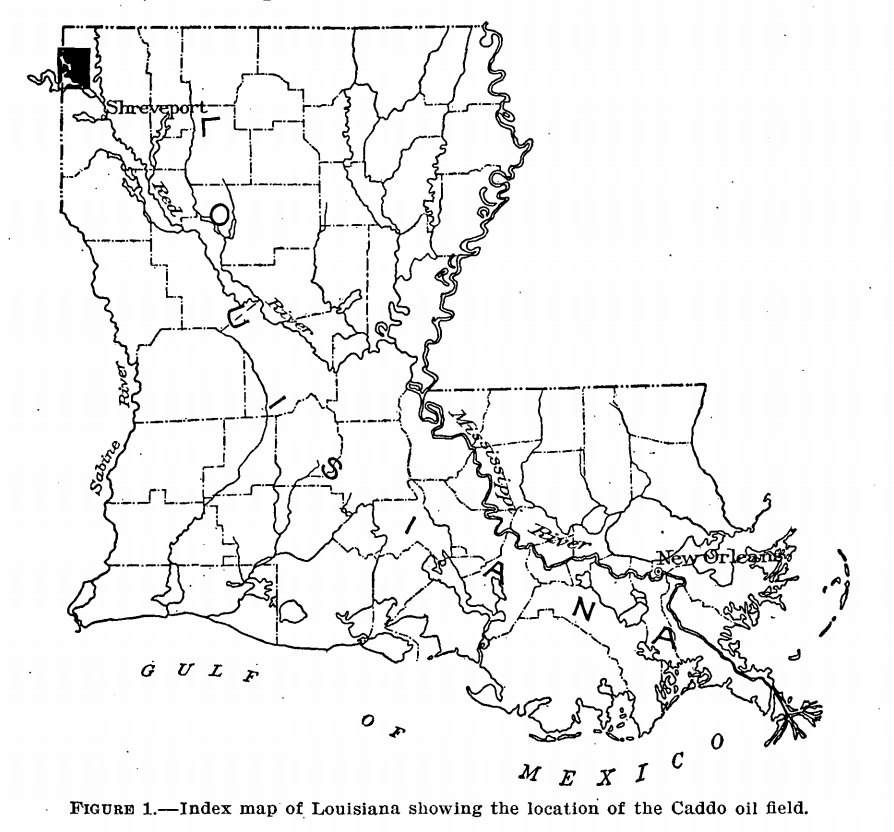
Map Caddo oil field, Louisiana

- El Dorado, 1915, Kansas, First oil field found using science/geologic mapping. Was 10% of the world's known reserves of oil at the time of discovery and produced 12.8% (29 million barrels) of the nations oil in 1918, deemed by some as the oil field that won World War I.
- Corsicana, 1896, Texas, plus 44 million barrels (7,000,000 m^{3}) little reserve remaining
- Bartlesville, 1897, Nellie Johnstone No. 1, Oklahoma, plus 1.6 billion barrels (250,000,000 m^{3}) in decline
- Burbank (Osage), 1897, Oklahoma, plus 1 billion barrels (160,000,000 m^{3}) still active
- Spindletop, 1901, Texas, plus 150 million barrels (24,000,000 m^{3}) little reserve remaining
- Glenn Pool, 1905, Ida Glenn No. 1, Oklahoma, 325 million barrels (51,700,000 m^{3}) little reserve remaining
- Cushing, 1912, Oklahoma
- Healdton, 1913, Franklin No. 1, Oklahoma
- Greater Seminole, 1926, Oklahoma, plus 200 million barrels (32,000,000 m^{3})
- McCamey, 1928, Baker No. 1., Texas
- Oklahoma City, No. 1 Discovery Well, 1928, Oklahoma. The Mary Sudik No. 1, "Wild Mary Sudik," gusher did not blow until March 25, 1930—she sprayed an estimated 3,000 barrels (480 m^{3}) an hour (133 L/s) for the next 11 days
- Caddo Pine Island, Louisiana, Auffenhauser No. 1, 1906
- Smackover, Arkansas, No. 1 J.T. Murphy, 1922
- El Dorado, Arkansas, Hill No. 1, 1919
- Rodessa, Caddo Parish, Louisiana, O.J. Hill No. 1, 1929
- Homer, Claiborne Parish, Louisiana, Shaw, 1919
- Haynesville, Claiborne Parish, Louisiana, Taylor No. 2, 1921
- Bull Bayou, Red River Parish, Louisiana, 1913
- Monroe Gas Field, Ouachita Parish, Louisiana, 1916

== See also ==
- Mid-Continent Airlines
