= Ixtoc I oil spill =

Oil spill disaster in the Gulf of Mexico

Ixtoc I
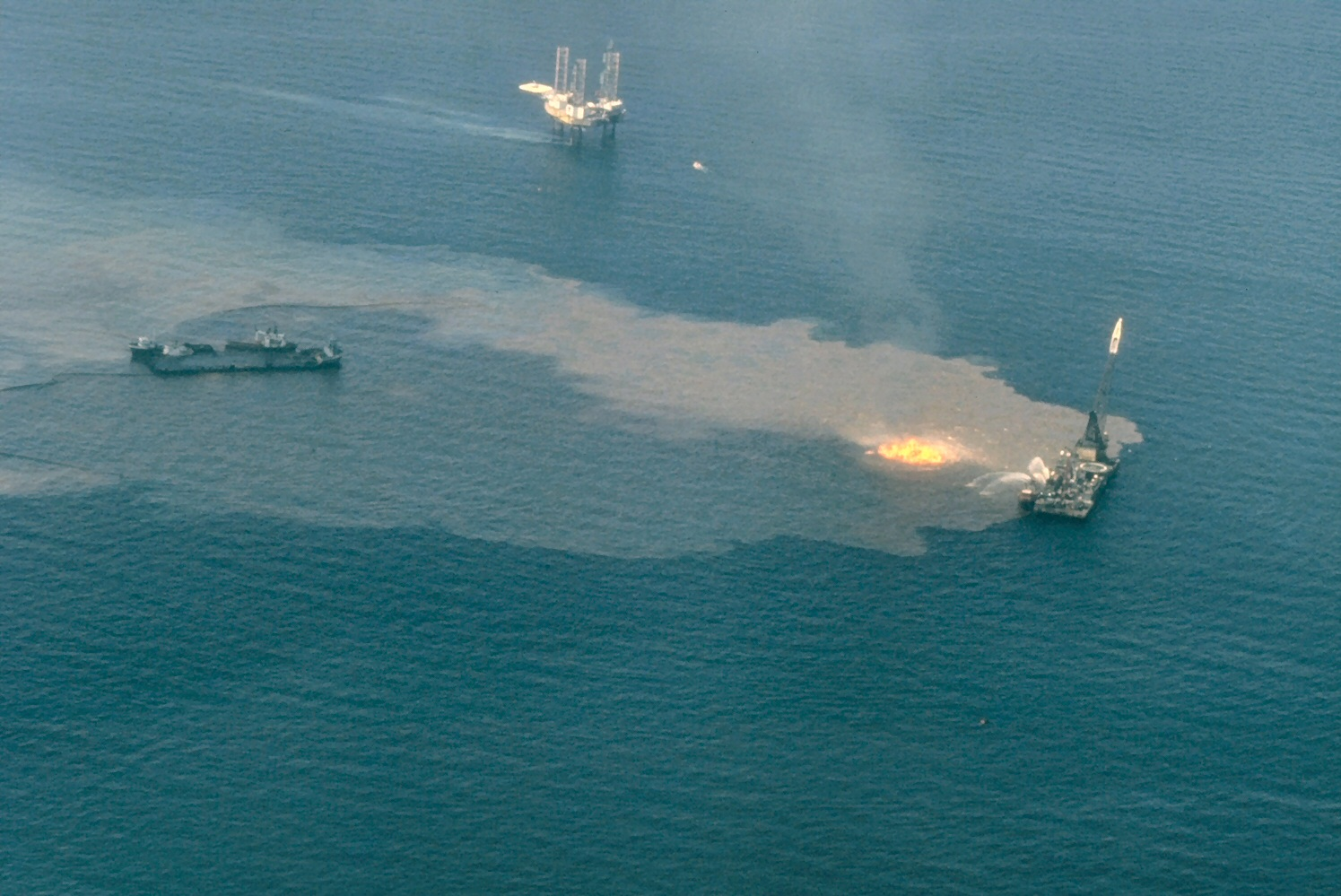
- Interactive map of Ixtoc I
- Location: Bay of Campeche, Gulf of Mexico; Campeche, Mexico
- Coordinates: 19.408333°N 92.325°W
- Date: 3 June 1979 – 23 March 1980

Cause
- Cause: Wellhead blowout
- Operator: Pemex

Spill characteristics
- Volume: 3 million barrels (130,000,000 U.S. gallons; 480,000 cubic meters)
- Area: 2,800 km^{2} (1,100 sq mi)
- Shoreline impacted: 261 km (162 mi)

Ixtoc I was an exploratory oil well being drilled by the semi-submersible drilling rig Sedco 135 in the Bay of Campeche of the Gulf of Mexico, about 100 km (62 mi) northwest of Ciudad del Carmen, Campeche in waters 50 m (164 ft) deep. On 3 June 1979, Ixtoc I suffered a well blowout resulting in the largest oil spill in history at its time. To-date, it remains the second largest marine oil spill in history after the Deepwater Horizon oil spill.

== Accident ==
Mexico's state-owned oil company Pemex (Petróleos Mexicanos) was drilling a 3 km (1.9 mi) deep oil well when the drilling rig Sedco 135 lost drilling mud circulation.

In modern rotary drilling, mud is circulated down the drillpipe and back up the wellbore to the surface. The goal is to equalize the pressure through the shaft and to monitor the returning mud for gas. Without the counter-pressure provided by the circulating mud, the pressure in the formation allowed oil to fill the well column, blowing out the well. The oil caught fire, and Sedco 135 was extensively burned then scuttled.

At the time of the accident, Sedco 135 was drilling at a depth of about 3,600 metres (11,800 ft) below the seafloor. The day before Ixtoc suffered the blowout and resulting fire that caused her to sink, the drill bit hit a region of soft strata. Subsequently, the circulation of drilling mud was lost resulting in a loss of hydrostatic pressure. Rather than returning to the surface, the drilling mud was escaping into fractures that had formed in the rock at the bottom of the hole. Pemex officials decided to remove the bit, run the drill pipe back into the hole, and then pump materials down this open-ended drill pipe to seal off the fractures that were causing the loss of circulation.

During the removal of the pipe on Sedco 135, the drilling mud suddenly began to flow up towards the surface; by removing the drillstring the well was swabbed (an effect observed when mud must flow down the annulus to replace displaced drill pipe volume below the bit), leading to a formation kick. Normally, this flow can be stopped by activating shear rams contained in the blowout preventer (BOP). These rams are designed to sever and seal off the well on the ocean floor; however, in this case, the drill collars had been brought in line with the BOP and the BOP rams were not able to sever the thick steel walls of the drill collars leading to a catastrophic blowout.

The drilling mud was followed by a large quantity of oil and gas at a flow rate that was still increasing. The oil and gas fumes exploded on contact with the operating pump motors, starting a fire which led to the collapse of the Sedco 135 drilling rig riser. The collapse caused damage to the BOP stack at the seafloor. The damage to the BOP led to the release of significant quantities of oil into the Gulf.

== Volume and extent of spill ==
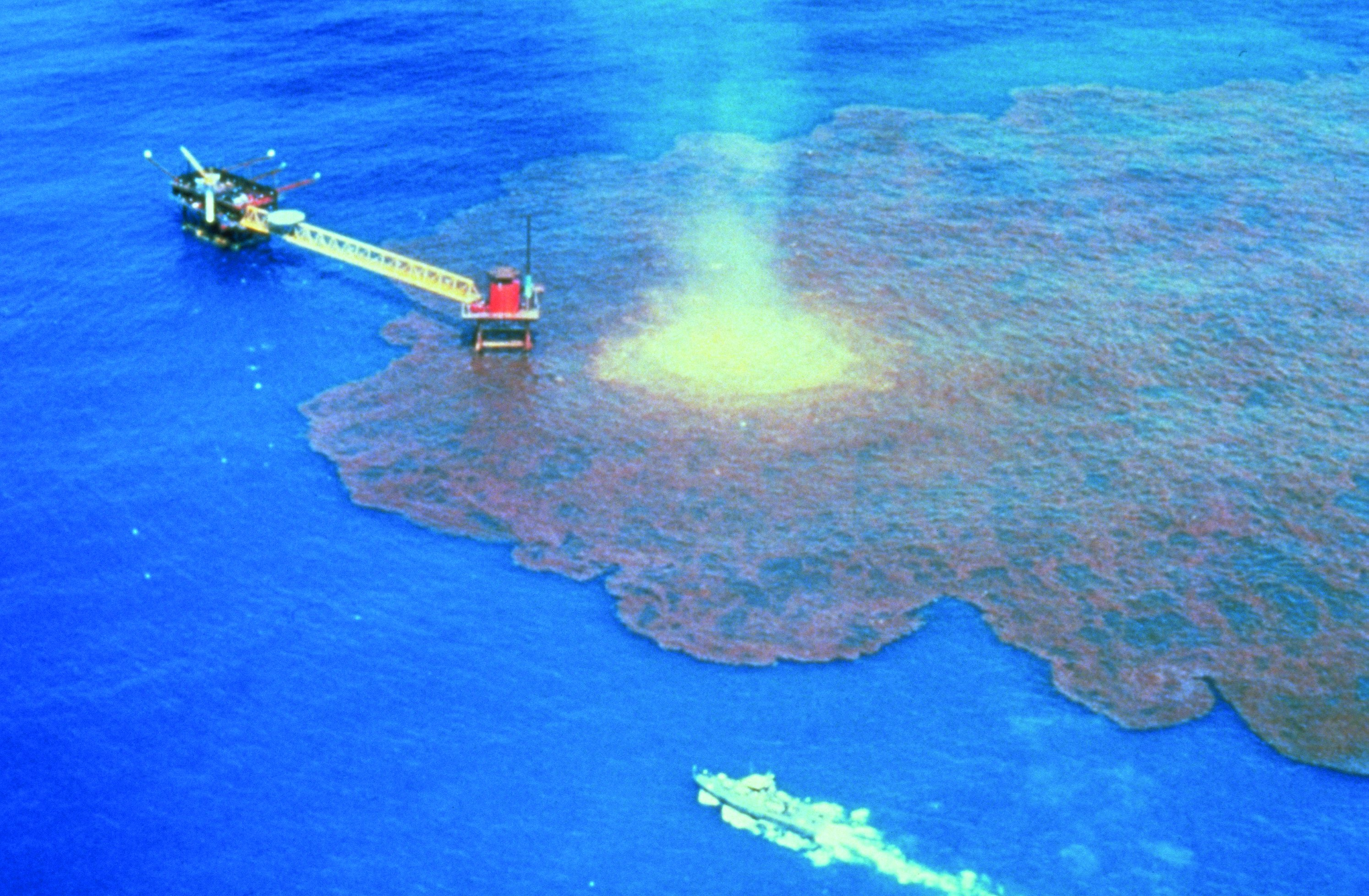
Spill c. September 1979

In the initial stages of the spill, an estimated 30,000 barrels (5,000 m^{3}) of oil per day were flowing from the well. One barrel of oil is equivalent to 159 liters (or 42 gallons) of liquid. In July 1979, the pumping of mud into the well reduced the flow to 20,000 barrels (3,000 m^{3}) per day, and early in August the pumping of nearly 100,000 steel, iron, and lead balls into the well reduced the flow to 10,000 barrels (2,000 m^{3}) per day. Pemex claimed that half of the released oil burned when it reached the surface, a third of it evaporated, and the rest was contained or dispersed. Mexican authorities also drilled two relief wells into the main well to lower the pressure of the blowout, however, the oil continued to flow for three months following the completion of the first relief well. In total, around 3,300,000 barrels (520,000 m^{3}) were spilled throughout the roughly 10 months it took for the oil to stop leaking.

Pemex contracted Conair Aviation to spray the chemical dispersant Corexit 9527 on the oil. A total of 493 aerial missions were flown, treating 1,100 square miles (2,800 km^{2}) of oil slick. Dispersants were not used in the U.S. area of the spill because of the dispersant's inability to treat weathered oil. Eventually the on-scene coordinator (OSC) requested that Mexico stop using dispersants north of 25°N.

In Texas, an emphasis was placed on coastal countermeasures protecting the bays and lagoons formed by the barrier islands. Impacts of oil on the barrier island beaches were ranked as second in importance to protecting inlets to the bays and lagoons. This was done with the placement of skimmers and booms. Efforts were concentrated on the Brazos-Santiago Pass, Port Mansfield Channel, Aransas Pass, and Cedar Bayou which during the spill was sealed with sand. Economically and environmentally sensitive barrier island beaches were cleaned daily. Laborers used rakes and shovels to clean beaches rather than heavier equipment which removed too much sand. Ultimately, 71,500 barrels (11,000 m^{3}) of oil impacted 162 miles (260 km) of U.S. beaches, and over 10,000 cubic yards (8,000 m^{3}) of oiled material were removed.

== Containment ==
In the next nine months, experts and divers including Red Adair were brought in to contain and cap the oil well. An average of approximately 10,000 to 30,000 barrels (2,000 to 5,000 m^{3}) per day were discharged into the Gulf until it was finally capped on 23 March 1980, nearly 10 months later. In similarity to the Deepwater Horizon oil spill 31 years later, the list of methods attempted to remediate the leak included lowering a cap over the well, plugging the leak with mud and "junk", use of dispersants, and spending months attempting to drill relief wells.

== Aftermath ==
Prevailing currents carried the oil towards the Texas coastline. The US government had two months to prepare booms to protect major inlets. Pemex spent $100 million to clean up the spill and avoided most compensation claims by asserting sovereign immunity as a state-run company.

The oil slick surrounded Rancho Nuevo, in the Mexican state of Tamaulipas, which is one of the few nesting sites for Kemp's ridley sea turtles. Thousands of baby sea turtles were airlifted to a clean portion of the Gulf of Mexico to help save the rare species.

== Long-term effects ==
The oil that was lost during the blow-out polluted a considerable part of the offshore region in the Gulf of Mexico as well as much of the coastal zone, which consists primarily of sandy beaches and barrier islands often enclosing extensive shallow lagoons.

The oil on Mexican beaches in early September was calculated to be about 6000 metric tons. Based on reports from various groups and individuals, five times that figure is thought to represent a fair estimate of what had landed on Mexican beaches. Investigations along the Texas coast show that approximately 4000 metric tons of oil or less than 1 percent was deposited there. The rest of the oil, about 120,000 metric tons or 25 percent, sank to the bottom of the Gulf.

The oil had a severe impact on the littoral crab and mollusk fauna of the beaches which were contaminated. The populations of crabs, e.g. the ghost crab Ocypode quadrata, was almost eliminated over a wide area. The crab populations on coral islands along the coast were also reduced to only a few percents of the normal populations about nine months after the spill.

A study concluded that the most persistent problems were the coastal lagoons lining the bay, as well as the pollution of estuaries. Specifically, they had problematic effects on the breeding and growth of several different species of food fish species.

The oil washed ashore, 30 cm (1 ft) deep in some places, as it was pushed north by prevailing winds and currents until it crossed the Texas border two months later and eventually coated almost 170 miles (270 km) of US beaches. The beach that caused most international concern in Mexico was Rancho Nuevo, a key nesting ground for critically endangered Kemp's ridley sea turtles which had already moved inland in their hundreds to lay eggs. By the time the eggs hatched, the oil had reached the shore.

Fishing was banned or restricted by Mexican authorities in contaminated areas north and south of the well. Fish and octopus catches dropped by 50 to 70% from the 1978 levels. Other species that had longer life spans took longer to recover, and it took until the late 1980s for the population of Kemp's ridley turtles to begin to recover. Ridley turtles only produce a few hundred eggs each year, in contrast with the millions of eggs that shrimp lay.

There is much less information on the impact of the Ixtoc I spill on benthic species (bottom dwellers). The best studies were on the Texas coast over 1000 km from the spill. Massive kills can occur when oil reaches the benthos in sufficient quantity. The only indication of a massive kill may be the remains of the dead organisms, but if they lack hard parts there will be little evidence.

A report prepared for the US Bureau of Land Management concluded concerning the spill's effect on US waters:

Despite a massive intrusion of petroleum hydrocarbon pollutants from the Ixtoc I event into the study region of the South Texas Outer Continental Shelf during 1979-1980, no definitive damage can be associated with this or other known spillage events (e.g., Burmah Agate) on either the epibenthic commercial shrimp population (based on chemical evidence) or the benthic infaunal community. Such conclusions have no bearing on intertidal or littoral communities, which were not the subject of this study.

== See also ==
- List of oil spills
- Notable offshore well blowouts
- Deepwater Horizon oil spill
- Ocean Ranger
- Piper Alpha
