= Oil well fire =

Blowout and subsequent fire of the Deepwater Horizon

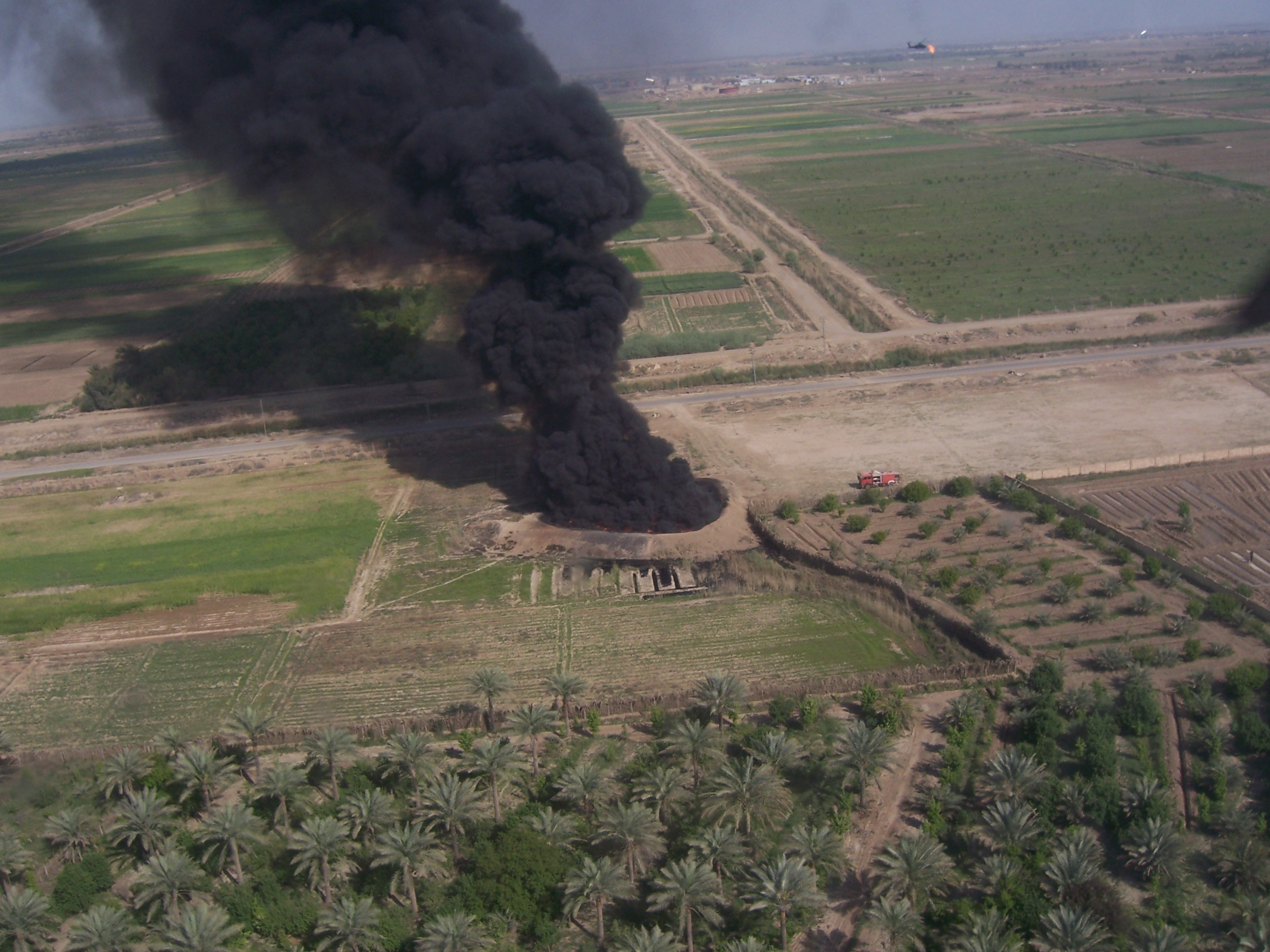
An oil well on fire in Iraq

Oil well fires are oil or gas wells that have become ignited by some means and burn, leading to devastating environmental, health, and economic effects. They can be caused by accident, arson, military actions, or natural events (such as lightning). They can exist on a small scale, such as an oil field spill catching fire, or on a huge scale, with geyser-like jets of flames from ignited high pressure wells. A frequent cause of a well fire is a high-pressure blowout during drilling operations.Once an oil well has caught fire, they can be extremely difficult to extinguish and clean up.

== Extinguishing ==
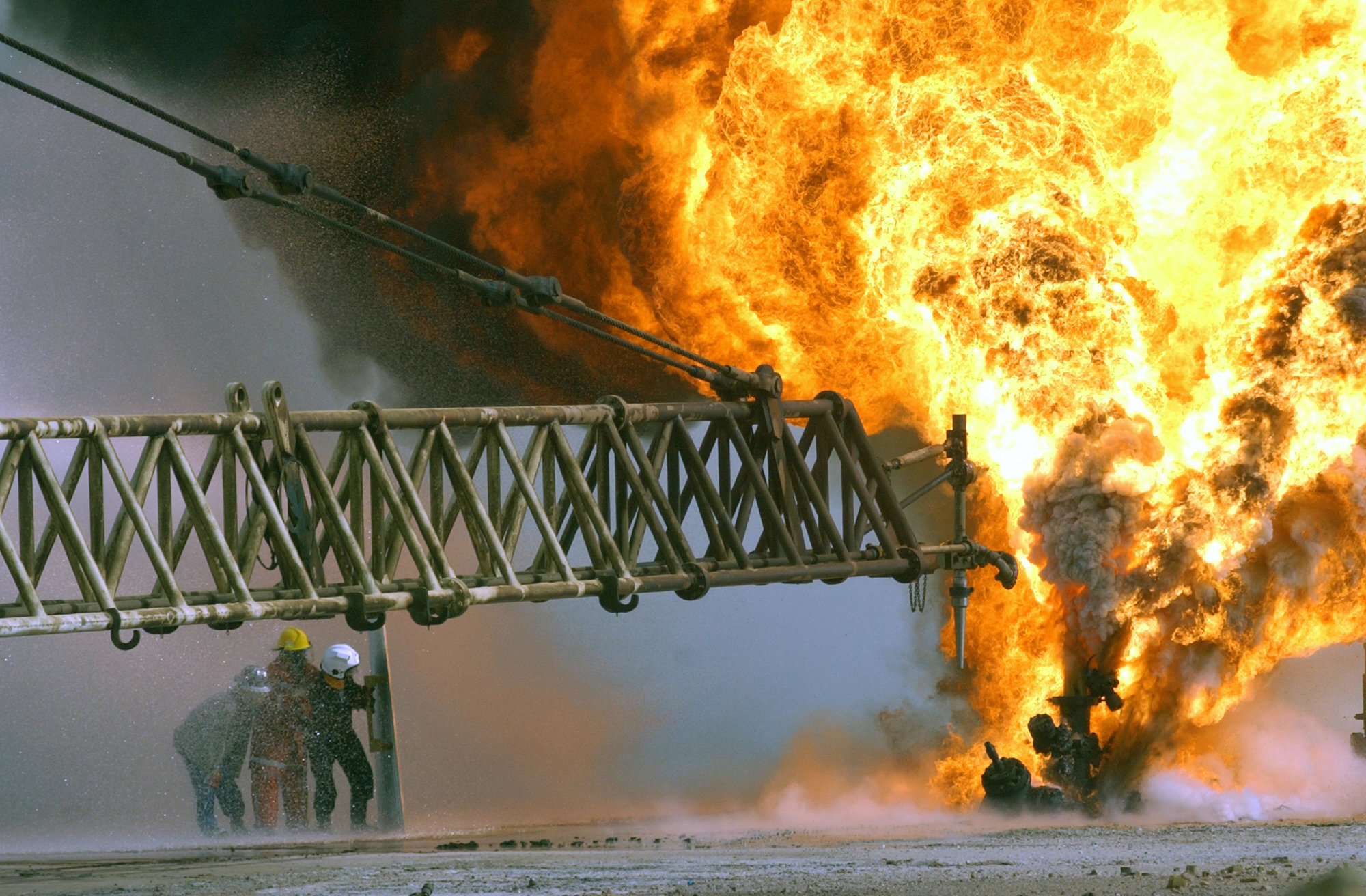
Kuwaiti firefighters fight to secure a burning oil well in the Iraqi Rumaila oilfields in 2003.

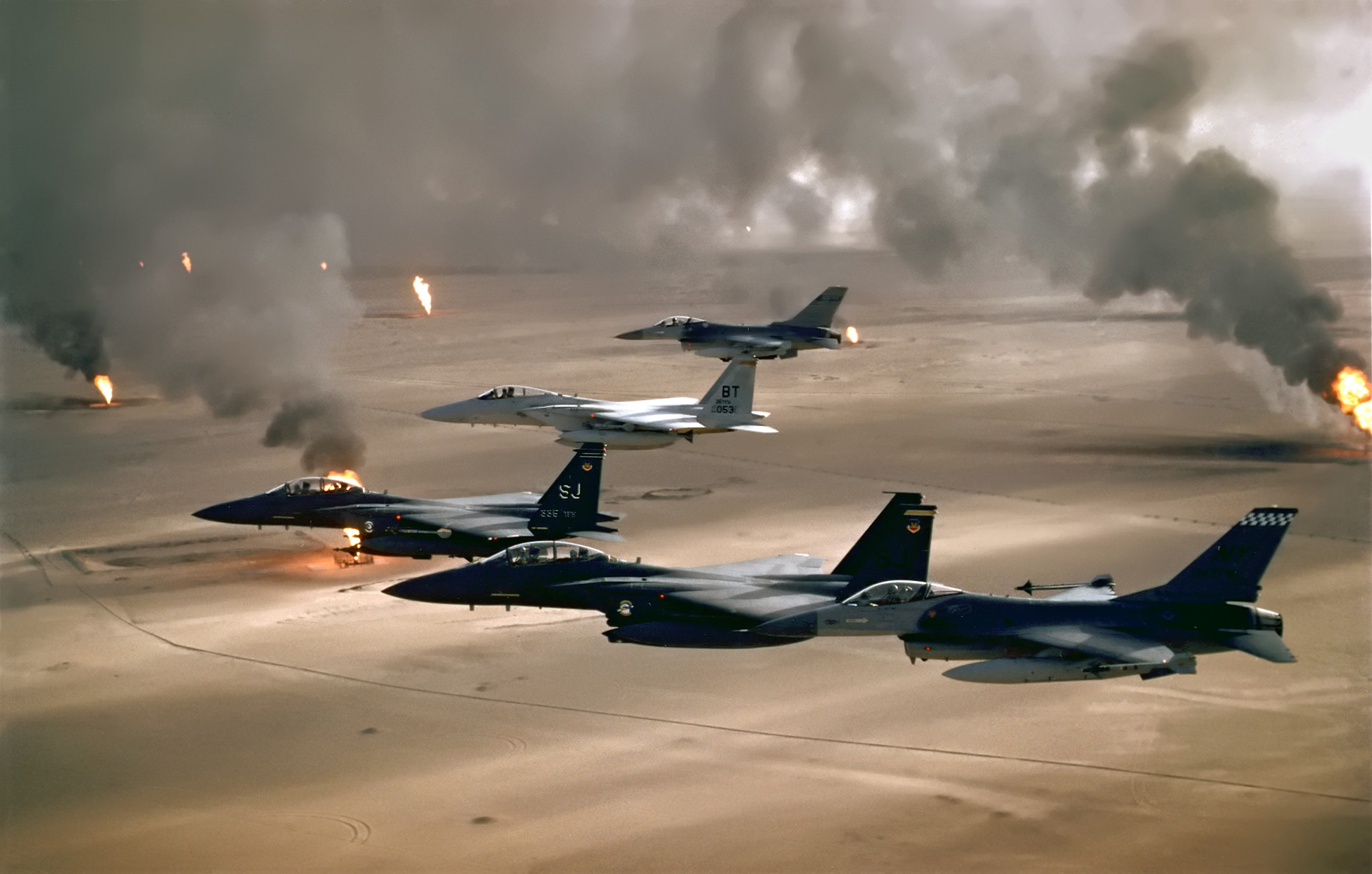
A fleet of F-16s and F-15s fly past burning oil wells in Kuwait during Operation Desert Storm, 1991

Oil well fires are more difficult to extinguish than regular fires due to the enormous fuel supply for the fire. In fighting a fire at a wellhead, typically high explosives, such as dynamite, are used to create a shockwave that pushes the burning fuel and local atmospheric oxygen away from a well. (This is a similar principle to blowing out a candle.) The flame is removed and the fuel can continue to spill out without catching fire.

After blowing out the fire, the wellhead must be capped to stop the flow of oil. During this time, copious fuel and oxygen are present; any spark or other heat source might ignite a fire worse than the original blowout. Thus brass tools, bronze tools, or paraffin wax-coated tools – which do not strike sparks – are used in capping.

Oil well firefighting was pioneered by Myron M. Kinley, who dominated the field in the early years. His lieutenant, Red Adair, went on to become the most famous of oil well firefighters. Some of the technology used by Red Adair to seal some of the Kuwait oil fires without re-igniting the flow of oil, originated in a patent by John R. Duncan (United States Patent 3,108,499 filed September 28, 1960, granted October 29,1963), a method and apparatus for severing section of fluid pipeline therefrom. The patent was granted a year after Red Adair's success in combating the Devil's Cigarette Lighter gas well fire. The invention is concerned with removing a section of a fluid pipeline and inserting a valve or other component therein without destroying line pressure and without losing any significant amount of fluid passing through the pipeline.

There are several techniques used to put out oil well fires, which vary by resources available and the characteristics of the fire itself. With recent advances in technology as well as environmental concerns, many straightforward well fires today are capped while they burn.

Techniques include:

- Dousing with copious amounts of water. According to Larry H. Flak, a petroleum engineer for Boots and Coots International Well Control, 90% of all the 1991 fires in Kuwait were put out with nothing but sea water, sprayed from powerful hoses at the base of the fire.
- Using a gas turbine to blast a fine mist of water at the base of the fire. Water is injected behind the exhaust of the turbine in large quantities. This proved popular with tackling stubborn fires in the Kuwait oil fires (1991) and was brought to the region by Hungarians equipped with MiG-21 engines mounted on a T-34 The Hungarian vehicle, named "Big Wind", was influenced by a similar concept used in Soviet times for extinguishing blown out gas- and oil-well fires and clearing snow off airfields by using a single MiG-15 jet engine bolted onto the bed of a truck. However, in this incarnation, it was not always powerful enough to defeat large fires, although it was also brought to and used in Kuwait; to tackle more resilient fires MB Drilling Company constructed "Big Wind" with two more powerful jet engines fixed to the more-stable chassis of a tank. The IMAX documentary Fires of Kuwait follows the numerous companies, and their methods, employed with the task of extinguishing the fires, with footage of the Hungarian "Big Wind" in action contained in the film.
- Using dynamite to "blow out" the fire by forcing the burning fuel and oxygen away from the fuel source. This was one of the earliest effective methods and is still widely used. The first use was by Myron Kinley's father in California in 1913. Generally explosives are placed within 55 gallon drums, the explosives are surrounded by fire retardant chemicals, and then the drums are wrapped with insulating material. A horizontal crane is used to bring the drum as close to the wellhead as possible. This method was depicted in the 1968 film Hellfighters starring John Wayne.
- Dry Chemical (mainly Purple K) can be used on small well fires.
- In the 1930s mechanical jaws were developed to clamp off the pipe below the fire, but they are seldom used today. The design became the basis for a safety device used on offshore wells.
- Special vehicles called "Athey wagons" as well as the typical bulldozer protected by corrugated steel sheeting are normally used in the process.
- Raising the plume: a metal casing 30 to 40 feet high is placed over the wellhead (thus raising the flame above the ground). Liquid nitrogen or water is then forced in at the bottom to reduce the oxygen supply and put out the fire.
- The "LeRoy Corporation, Houston Oil well Firefighters" constructed a machine with an arm that was positioned over an oil well pipe on fire. The machine then lowers a cap over the pipe, extinguishing the flames. LeRoy Ashmore built 3 of these machines and named them Shadrach, Meshach, and Abednego, for the Biblical characters, who survived death from a fiery furnace. The walls of LeRoy's machines were hollow, allowing water pumped through them to circulate and keep the interior control room water cooled during fire fighting.
- Drilling relief wells into the producing zone to redirect some of the oil and make the fire smaller. (However, most relief wells are used to pump heavy mud and cement deep into the wild well.) The first relief wells were drilled in Texas in the mid-1930s.
- Under the Soviet Nuclear Explosions for the National Economy program, underground nuclear explosions were successfully employed to stop well fires. The high heat of the detonation simultaneously displaces and melts the rock in its vicinity, and with that seals the previously drilled hole.

== Effects ==
Oil well fires can cause the loss of millions of barrels of crude oil per day. Combined with the ecological problems caused by the large amounts of smoke and unburnt petroleum falling back to earth, oil well fires such as those seen in Kuwait in 1991 can cause enormous economic losses.

Smoke from burnt crude oil contains many chemicals, including sulfur dioxide, carbon monoxide, soot, benzopyrene, Poly aromatic hydrocarbons, and dioxins. Exposure to oil well fires is commonly cited as a cause of the Gulf War Syndrome, however, studies have indicated that the firemen who capped the wells did not report any of the symptoms suffered by the soldiers.

The Deepwater Horizon oil spill is largely considered the largest oil spill in history. The initial spill was caused by an explosion in April of 2010, leading to a constant leak of oil for 87 days before it was able to be capped in July of the same year. The effects of this spill were devastating, with an estimated 134 million gallons of oil released into the Gulf of Mexico. It took many years of research and data collection to fully grasp the impact of this spill. Findings have shown impacts on sea mammals, sea turtles, fish, birds, and even coastal wildlife. Nearly all species of dolphins and whales in the northern Gulf have shown quantifiable injuries due to exposure, there has been an estimated population reduction of nearly half for bottlenose dolphins in Barataria Bay and the Mississippi Sound, as many as 167,000 sea turtles of all ages were killed during the event, and up to 20 percent of juvenile Kemp's Ridley sea turtle, a species that had been making a recovery in 2010, were killed. These effects described give a brief look into the ecological impact of oil well fires on sea life, not only at the time of the spill but also for many years to come.

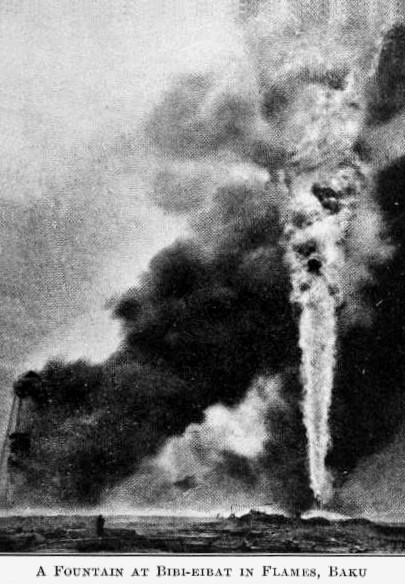
1904 fire at a Bibi-Eibat oil well

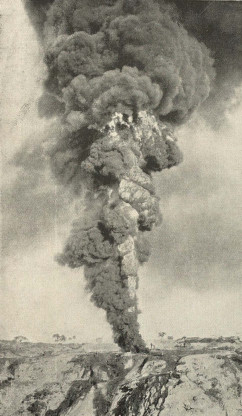
A Burmese oil well on fire, c. 1905

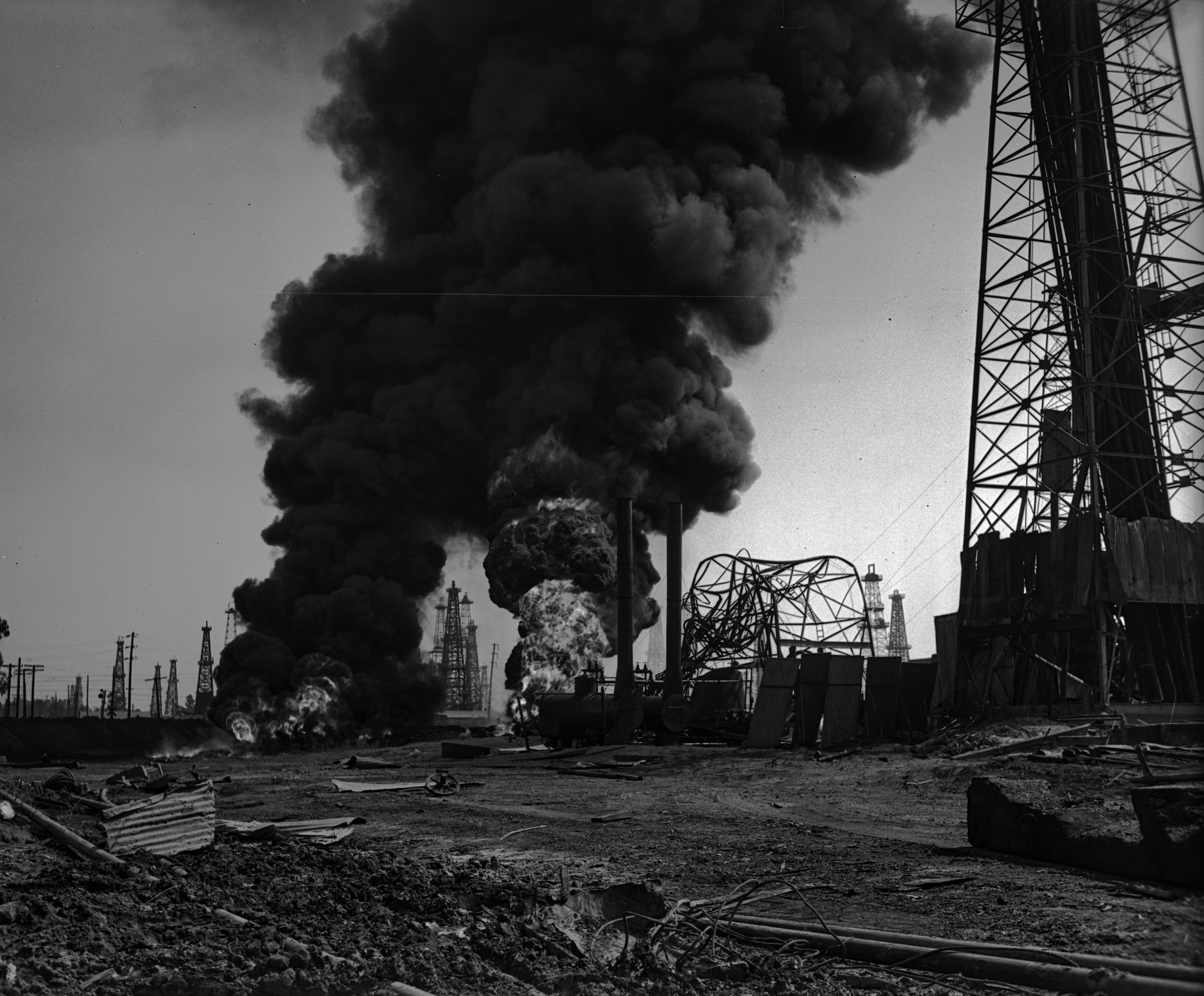
Two wells on fire, Santa Fe Springs, California, 1928

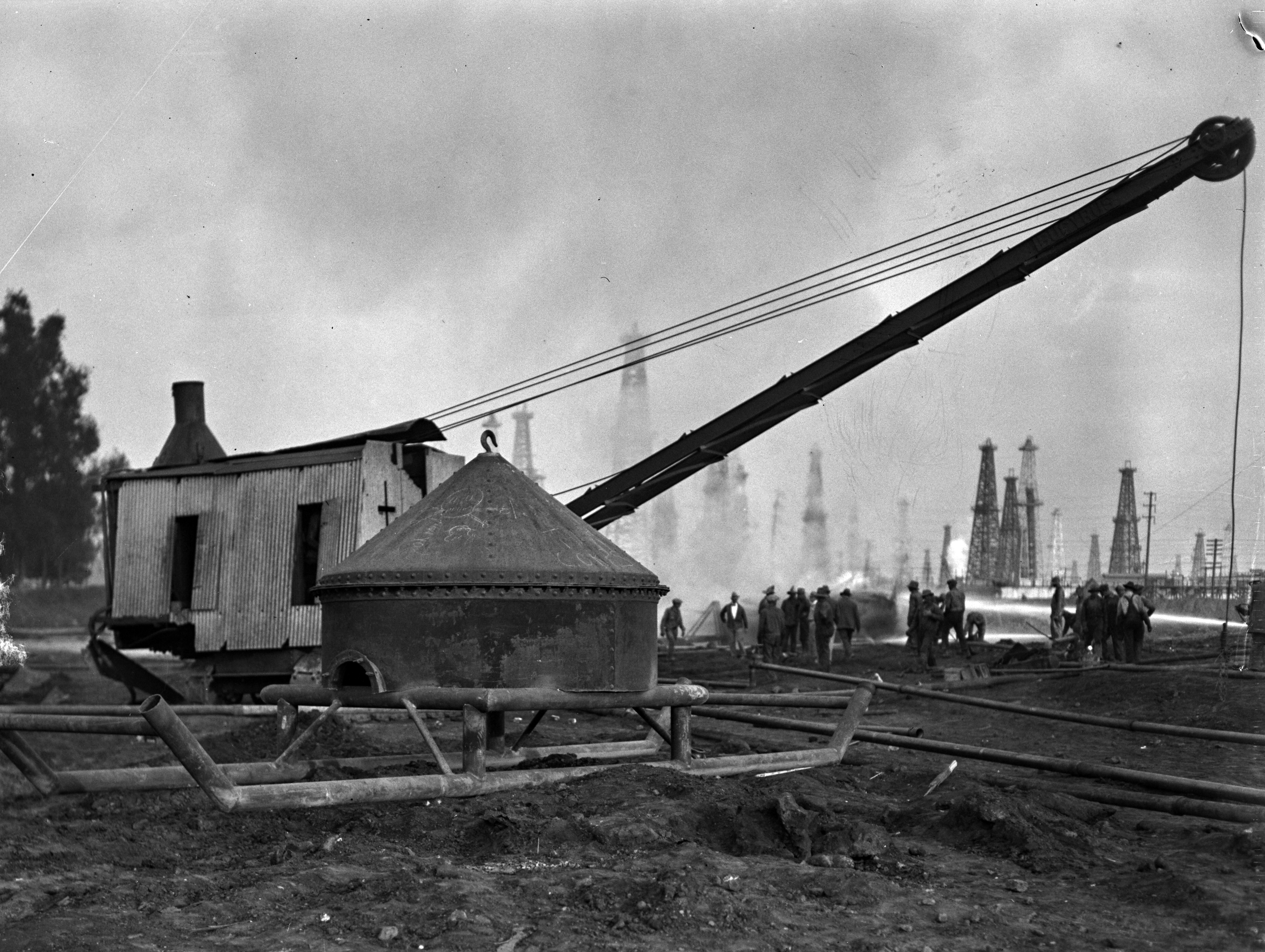
Steel cap used to cap burning oil well in Santa Fe Springs, California, 1928

== Notable occurrences ==
- Piper Alpha, an oil rig that caught fire
- Kuwaiti oil fires (1991)
- Deepwater Horizon explosion
- Tengiz Field explosion

== See also ==
- Coal seam fire
- Derweze
