= Myron M. Kinley =

American oil firefighter

Myron Macy Kinley (July 4, 1896 – May 12, 1978) was an American pioneer in fighting oil well fires.

Kinley's parents, Karl T. Kinley (1859-1944) and Katherine Rose Scholl (1868-1910) were married July 4, 1896, in Pasadena, California. Kinley was born in Santa Barbara, California, and moved with his family to Bakersfield in 1899. His sister Lucille was born in 1903, and brother Floyd in 1904.

Kinley's father was an oil well shooter in California, setting off explosives to fracture the subsurface formation and increase well flow. In 1913, faced with a roaring fire resulting from a blowout, Karl tried blowing it out with a giant "puff" of dynamite. It worked, and remains a common technique for fighting oil fires. Young Kinley, who helped with the first shot, went on to develop the business of oil well firefighting, essentially establishing the industry. Although it was lucrative, it had its risks. Kinley's right leg was permanently injured in late 1936 at the Bay City fire.

Kinley's younger brother, Floyd (November 28, 1904 – March 12, 1938) worked with Myron. Floyd died from injuries sustained during a well blowout accident near Goliad, Texas. Myron Kinley survived many incidents, including being severely burned in an accident in Venezuela in 1945.

During Kinley's life he developed many patents and designs for the tools and techniques of oil firefighting. He also trained others in their use, including legendary Red Adair, "Boots" Hansen and "Coots" Mathews (Boots & Coots). Virtually every organization in the oil well firefighting business today can trace its roots back to Myron Kinley and the MM Kinley Company.

Kinley married Rowena May Hall in 1924. Rowena died January 17, 1957. Kinley married Jessie Dearing of Chickasha, Oklahoma, on November 2, 1958. Kinley died at home in Chickasha on May 12, 1978. In 1995, as a tribute to her late husband, Jessie published the book Call Kinley about Myron Kinley's achievements.

In 1952, Kinley and his work were the subject of an award nominated film documentary, Rig 20. The film was nominated for the 1952 best documentary award by the British Academy of Film and Television Arts and the Venice Film Festival.
