= Hellfighters =

Hellfighters may refer to:

- Hellfighters, nickname of the 369th Infantry Regiment (United States)
- Hellfighters (film), a 1968 film with John Wayne based loosely on Red Adair
