= Marine Well Containment Company =

Marine Well Containment Company (MWCC) provides well containment equipment and technology in the deepwater U.S. Gulf of Mexico for use after blowouts. It is based in Houston, Texas. MWCC members are major companies in the petroleum industry that drill wells in the Gulf of Mexico including: BP, Shell Oil, ExxonMobil, Chevron Corporation and ConocoPhillips.

In 2010, in response to the Deepwater Horizon oil spill, ExxonMobil, Chevron Corporation, ConocoPhillips and Shell Oil committed to providing a new containment response capability. These founding companies of MWCC recognized the need to be better prepared in the event of a deepwater well control incident.

MWCC introduced the Interim Containment System in February 2011, improving previous response capabilities and helping the industry get back to work in the U.S. Gulf of Mexico. In January 2015, MWCC accepted its Expanded Containment System forming the MWCC Containment System which builds upon the past system capabilities.

The Containment System is available for use in the deepwater U.S. Gulf of Mexico in depths from 500 feet to 10,000 feet, temperatures up to 400 °F (204 °C) and pressures up to 20k psi. The system can cap or cap and flow an incident well and has the capacity to process up to 100,000 barrels of liquid per day and up to 200 million cubic feet of gas per day. Additionally, it is able to store up to 700,000 barrels of liquid in each of its two Modular Capture Vessels. The liquid is then brought onshore for further processing via shuttle tankers.

MWCC maintains components of the Containment System in a ready state at two shore base locations along the Gulf Coast of the United States and conducts drills and training sessions on a regular basis to ensure personnel and equipment are ready to respond. TechnipFMC manages and operates the subsea containment system at SURF shore base in Theodore, Alabama. Kiewit Corporation (KOS) operates the MCV shore base at Ingleside, Texas. The Containment System is designed to be flexible, adaptable and ready to be mobilized upon incident notification.
