= Devil's Cigarette Lighter =

Natural gas well fire in Algeria

A photo of the fire from a later documentary film

Location of Gassi Touil in Algeria

The Devil's Cigarette Lighter was a natural gas well fire at Gassi Touil in the Sahara Desert of Algeria. The fire was ignited on November 6, 1961, and burned until being extinguished by Red Adair and his colleagues, who used explosives to deprive the flame of oxygen, on April 28, 1962.

== Ignition ==
The fire was ignited by static electricity when a pipe at the GT2 well ruptured on November 6, 1961. The Phillips Petroleum Company/OMNIREX/COPEFA-owned well produced more than 6,000 cubic feet (170 m^{3}) of natural gas per second, and the flame rose between 450 feet (140 m) and 800 feet (240 m). The flame was seen from orbit by John Glenn during the flight of Friendship 7 on February 20, 1962. The blowout and fire were estimated to have consumed enough gas to supply Paris for three months, burning 550,000,000 cubic feet (16,000,000 m^{3}) per day.

== Extinguishment ==
Preparations to extinguish the fire took five months, and were led by well fire expert Red Adair. Adair worked the fire with Asger "Boots" Hansen and Ed "Coots" Matthews, who later formed the Boots & Coots well control company. Adair's team cleared wreckage from near the wellhead with shielded bulldozers, dug wells, and excavated three reservoirs for water supplies.

On April 28, 1962, Adair used a modified bulldozer with a 66-foot (20 m) arm to move a metal drum containing a 550-pound (250 kg) nitroglycerin charge to the well. Adair, Matthews, Hansen and Charley Tolar rode the rig, protected by a metal heat shield and water sprays, with Adair driving and the others on a shielded platform while medical teams and evacuation helicopters stood by. After positioning the explosives, the team ran to a trench about 150 feet (46 m) from the well. The explosion extinguished the fire by displacing oxygen from the area of the ruptured well. Water from the reservoirs was used to flood the area for two days to cool the well. Drilling mud was pumped into the hole to control the flow of gas and the well was capped after four days of work. Lateral wells to the GT2 well bore pumped mud into the bore to help to control the flow of gas.

The exploit made Adair a celebrity. Part of the John Wayne movie Hellfighters (1968) was loosely based upon the feats of Adair during the 1962 Sahara Desert fire.
