= Cactus Pryor =

American broadcaster and radio personality (1923–2011)

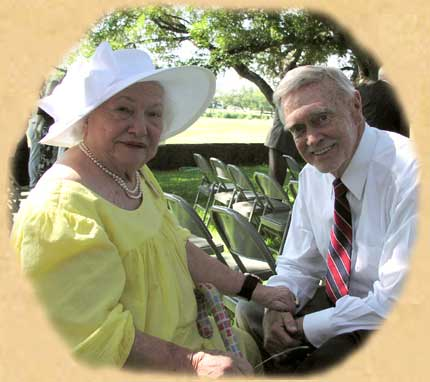
Pryor with Liz Carpenter (left) in 2003

Richard S. "Cactus" Pryor (January 7, 1923 – August 30, 2011) was an American broadcaster and humorist. He received his nickname after the old Cactus Theater on Congress Avenue in Austin, Texas, which was run by his father, "Skinny" Pryor.

Pryor was first heard on Lady Bird Johnson's radio station 590 KLBJ, though his face became as well known as his voice once he moved to television broadcasting on Austin television station KTBC.

In addition to his work in radio and television, Pryor also appeared in two films starring John Wayne, both released in 1968: Hellfighters and The Green Berets. Pryor was the author of a 1995 collection of some 40 essays entitled Playback. At KTBC, Pryor had served as programming manager and had hosted a variety of shows. He had conducted interviews with celebrities such as Arthur Godfrey and Dan Blocker and narrated behind-the-scenes programs about KTBC.

As part of his involvement with the Headliners Club of Austin journalists, Pryor starred in satires of television news. He provided the voiceover for the 1960 KTBC film “Target Austin”, which presents the scenario of a nuclear missile strike on Austin.

In 1950, Pryor had a novelty hit on the country music charts with the number 7 "Cry of the Dying Duck in a Thunder-Storm", a parody of Tennessee Ernie Ford's "The Cry of the Wild Goose".

He regaled audiences on Austin radio with a daily 2-minute trip down memory lane, reminiscing about places and people from his past well into the 2000s. He was a self-described liberal, but acknowledged that his children do not share his beliefs. He claimed to have been one of the first people to have heard of the assassination of President John F. Kennedy, having been at the ranch of then-vice president Lyndon Baines Johnson at the time.

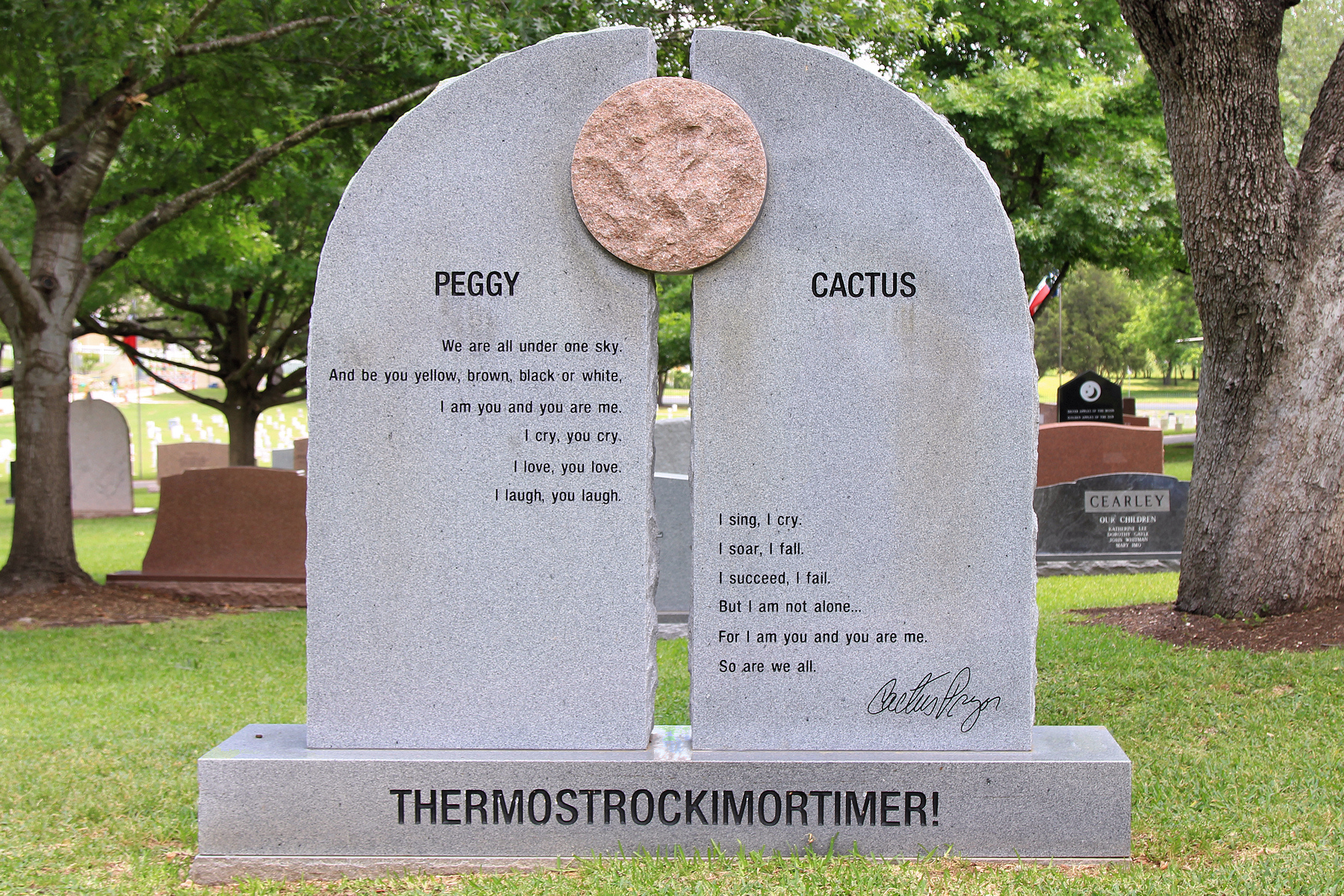
The back side of Cactus Pryor's grave marker in the Texas State Cemetery

Pryor had for several years, been a radio spokesman for the Austin-based Tex-Mex restaurant chain Serrano's. In these ads, he is often called "Nopalito," which loosely means little cactus, after the Spanish word nopal. His broadcasting sign-off consisted of a nonsense word, "thermostrockimortimer," the meaning of which (if any) was never made public. Cactus stated that, "The phrase is in the Bible; if you don't find it, keep reading." "Thermostrockimortimer!" appears on the shared headstone of Cactus Pryor and his wife Peggy in the Texas State Cemetery in Austin.

Pryor's brother, Wally John Pryor (1928-2014), was also involved in local broadcasting at KTBC and the University of Texas at Austin, and was the "Voice of the Longhorn Band" for decades.

In 2007, Pryor told his radio audience that he was battling Alzheimer's disease. He died on August 30, 2011, in Austin, Texas, aged 88, weeks after breaking his leg in a fall.

His son, Don Pryor, was co-host of the "Todd and Don Show" on News Radio KLBJ. Another of Cactus's sons, Paul Pryor (1949-2015), once worked in Austin radio as well.

== Filmography ==
| Year | Title | Role | Notes |
|---|---|---|---|
| 1968 | The Green Berets | Collier | |
| 1968 | Hellfighters | Chance's Doctor | |
| 1986 | Trespasses | Dr. Laswell | (final film role) |
