= Red Adair =

American oil well firefighter (1915–2004)

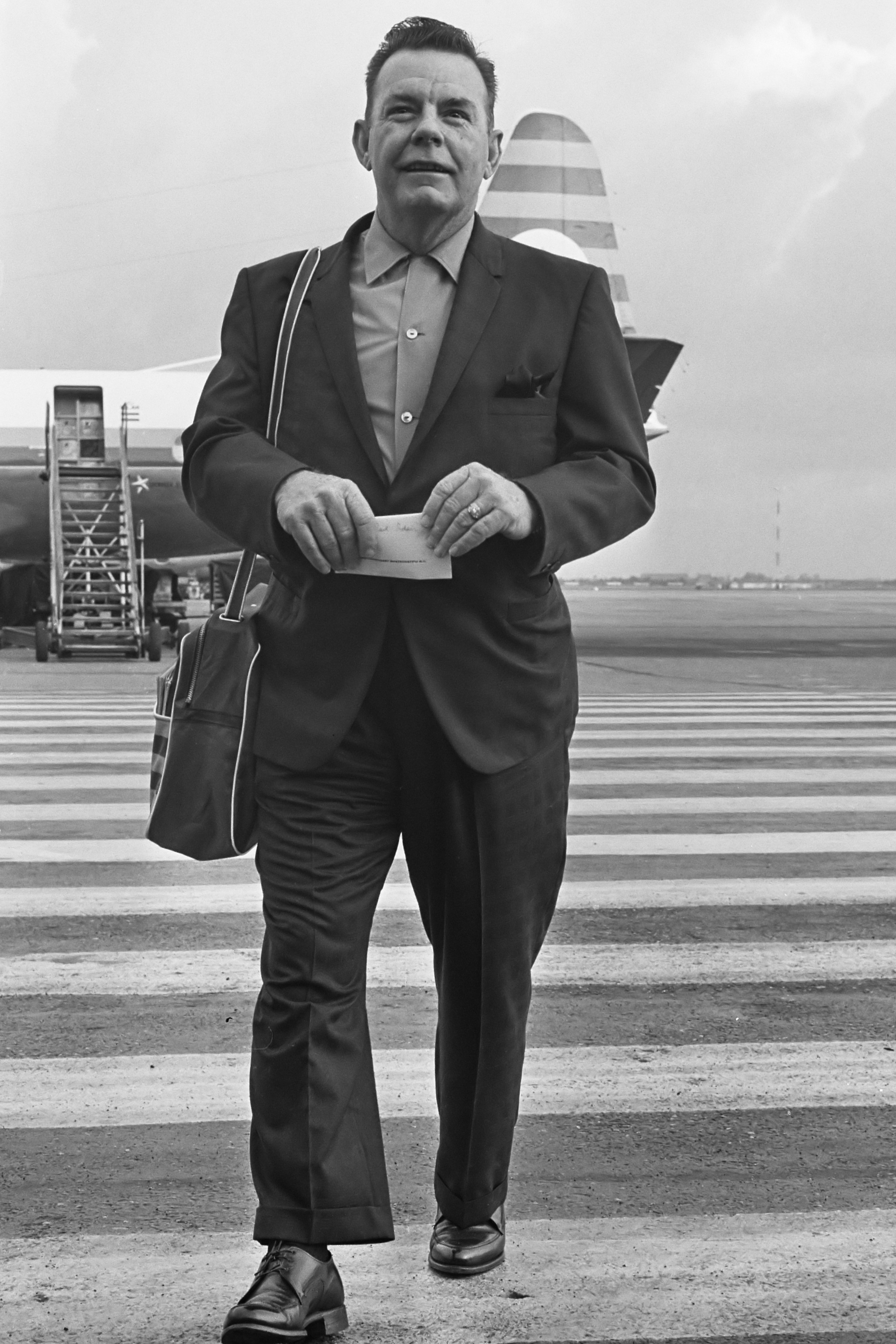
- Red Adair in 1964
- Born: Paul Neal Adair; June 18, 1915; Houston, Texas, U.S.
- Died: August 7, 2004 (aged 89); Houston, Texas, U.S.
- Occupation: Firefighter

Paul Neal "Red" Adair (June 18, 1915 – August 7, 2004) was an American oil well firefighter. He became notable internationally as an innovator in the specialized and hazardous profession of extinguishing and capping oil well blowouts, both land-based and offshore.

== Early life and education ==
Adair was born in Houston, Texas, the son of an Irish immigrant blacksmith and his wife. He attended Reagan High School.

== Military service and career ==
During World War II, Adair served with the US Army, in a bomb disposal unit. After the war ended, he started working in the oil industry. He started his career working for Myron Kinley, the "original" blowout/oil firefighting pioneer. They pioneered the technique of using a V-shaped charge of high explosives to snuff the fire by the blast. This was known as the Munroe effect, which Adair knew was used with bazookas and the atom bomb.

In 1959 he founded Red Adair Co. Inc. During the course of his career, Adair helped extinguish more than 2,000 land and offshore oil well, natural gas well, and similar spectacular fires. He gained global attention in 1962 when he fought a fire at the Gassi Touil gas field in the Algerian Sahara nicknamed the Devil's Cigarette Lighter, a 450-foot (140 m) pillar of flame that burned from 12:00 pm November 13, 1961, to 9:30 am on April 28, 1962. In December 1968, Adair sealed a large gas leak at an Australian gas and oil platform off Victoria's southeast coast. Also in 1968, Adair stopped a 6-day oil well fire at the Aliso Canyon Oil Field near Porter Ranch, Los Angeles.

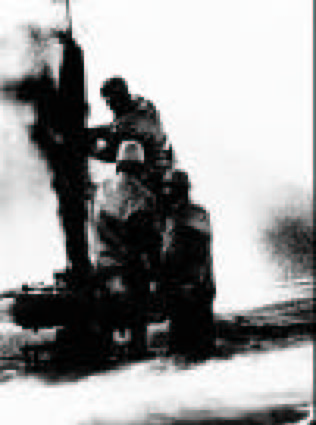
Adair fighting an oil field fire in the Elk Hills Oil Field in California on October 27, 1977.

In 1977, he and his crew, including Asger "Boots" Hansen and Manohar "Man" Dhumtara-Kejriwal, contributed to capping the biggest oil well blowout to have occurred in the North Sea. At the time this was the largest offshore blowout worldwide, in terms of volume of crude oil spilled. This took place at the Ekofisk Bravo platform, located in the Norwegian sector and operated by Phillips Petroleum Company, now ConocoPhillips.

In 1978, Adair's top lieutenants Hansen and Ed "Coots" Matthews left to found a competitor company, Boots & Coots International Well Control Inc.

In 1988, Adair helped to extinguish the UK sector Piper Alpha oil platform fire in the North Sea. At age 75, Adair participated with extinguishing the oil well fires in Kuwait set by retreating Iraqi troops after the Gulf War in 1991.

Adair retired in 1993, and sold The Red Adair Service and Marine Company to Global Industries. His top employees (Brian Krause, Raymond Henry, Rich Hatteberg) left in 1994 and formed their own company, International Well Control (IWC).

Adair died in Houston in 2004 at the age of 89. He is buried in a crypt at Forest Park Lawndale in Houston.

== Family ==
He was survived by his wife, a son Jimmy and a daughter Robyn and grandson Paul Wayne Hinson.

== Legacy ==
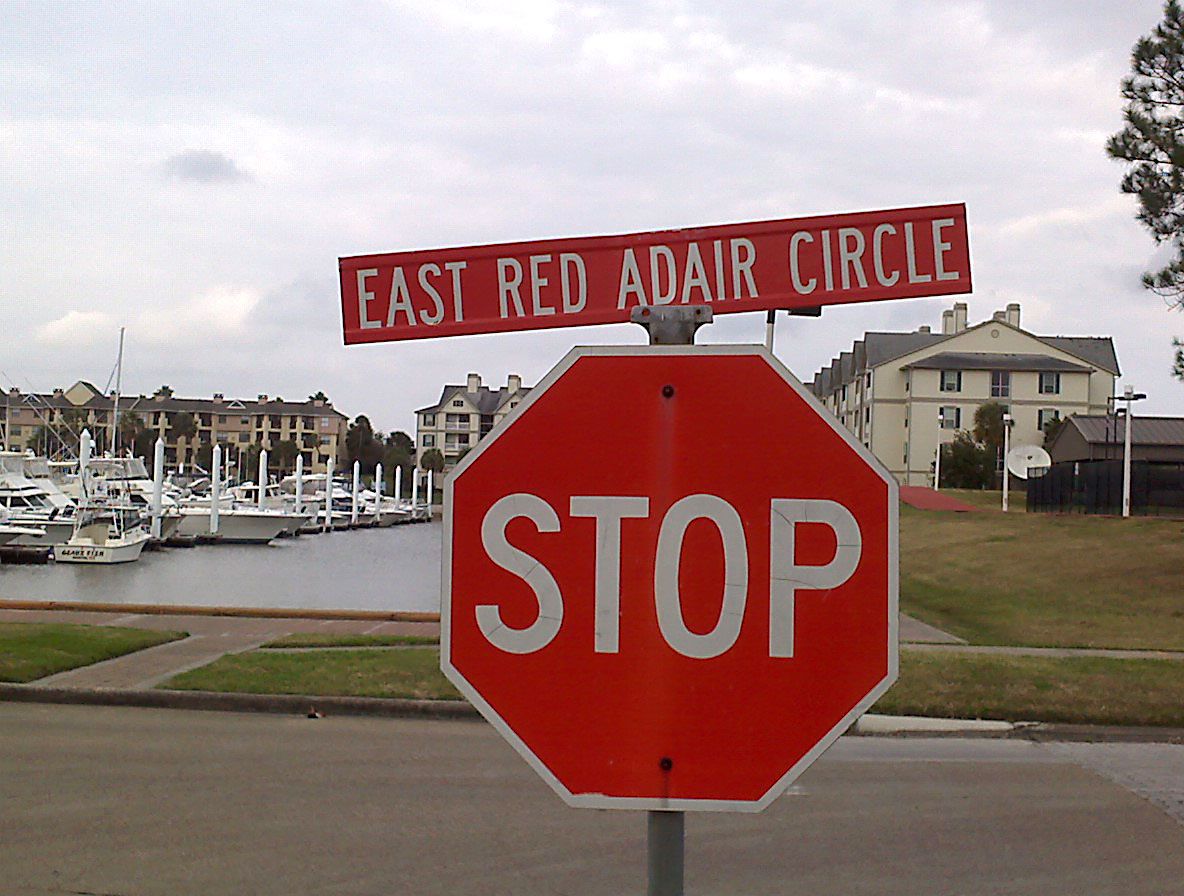
The roads around South Shore Harbour Marina in League City, Texas, where Red Adair kept his boat, were named after him.

- He appears in the Iranian documentary A Fire (Ebrahim Golestan, 1961) when he was working for Myron Kinley.
- The 1968 John Wayne movie Hellfighters was based loosely upon the feats of Adair during the 1962 fire in the Sahara.
- Adair received the Golden Plate Award of the American Academy of Achievement in 1980.
- The History Channel's Modern Marvels episode on "Oil Well Firefighting" was one of Adair's last interviews prior to his death. The episode was broadcast after Adair's death and was dedicated to his memory.
- The Travel Channel's Mysteries at the Museum "Most Explosive" episode (2014) features a segment on Adair's success in 1961 in stopping the burning gas line in the Algerian Sahara Desert; it was nicknamed "The Devil's Cigarette Lighter".
- He was a longtime member of Lakewood Yacht Club.
- In Season 2, Episode 6 of MacGyver (2016 TV series), Red Adair's life, particularly the Devil's Cigarette Lighter incident, is shown to be an inspiration for character Jack Dalton and explains why he knows so much about oil well fires when the team is tasked with stopping one in Nigeria.
