= Wild Mary Sudik =

Coordinates: 35°23′06″N 97°27′14″W

The Wild Mary Sudik gusher was an oil well blowout that took place on March 26, 1930 in what is now Oklahoma City, Oklahoma, USA. The gusher from Mary Sudik No. 1 well received extensive media coverage and was the subject of daily radio reports by NBC's Floyd Gibbons and newsreels that were shown in movie theaters. The gusher flowed for eleven days before it was capped on the third try.

Mary Sudik No. 1 well was developed by the Indian Territory Illuminating Oil Company on the property of Vincent and Mary Sudik. The well, located about 2,000 feet (610 m) to the southeast of the present intersection of Interstate 240 and Bryant Avenue, to the south of the Oklahoma City center, blew out when the drilling crew underestimated well pressures in the newly developed Wilcox formation, producing 20,000 barrels of oil and 200,000,000 cubic feet (5,700,000 m^{3}) of gas per day from the 6,471-foot (1,972 m) well. According to the well completion report, it produced 15,441 barrels of oil in a test run for 13 hours and 15 minutes. The crew had neglected to keep sufficient drilling mud in the well, and did not use a safety head, contrary to the accepted practice of the time, running the well "wild." The initial flow of gas from the well changed to oil after about a day, with oil fountaining up to 400 feet (120 m) into the air. Oil vapor blew in the wind as far as Norman, 11 miles (18 km) to the south. A safety zone was established around the well to prevent fire. The American Iron and Machine Company was engaged to cap the well, led by superintendent H. M. Myracle. The first attempt failed after twelve hours, but a second attempt restricted the flow, and oil was diverted into a pit until a final seal could be effected. A total of 211,600 barrels of oil was recovered from the vicinity of the well, and as many as 800,000 barrels were believed to have been wasted. Once controlled, Mary Sudik No. 1 was the most productive well in the world in 1930.

The blowout, and a similar gas well blowout in Oklahoma City the day after the Mary Sudik well was brought under control, stimulated the development and use of blowout preventers as standard equipment in petroleum well drilling, and resulted in greater regulation of well drilling in Oklahoma City.

The Sudiks were Czech immigrants who moved to Oklahoma from Nebraska in 1904 to buy their 160-acre (65 ha) dairy farm. They expanded the farm to two additional quarter sections, one of which, bought in 1924, was the site of the wild well. Mary had been the first to sign the well lease, so the wells on the property were named after her. Mary Valish Sudik, a modest woman, was offered roles in a vaudeville tour and a movie. She and her husband instead moved into town and lived quietly on the royalties from the thirteen wells on their property. Mary died in 1942, her obituary appearing on the front page of the Daily Oklahoman. Vincent died in 1940. Their son Orie was killed while working on a well in the Moore oil field of Oklahoma in 1945.

The Mary Sudik No. 1 well was finally plugged on June 22, 1974 by the operator, Cities Service Oil Company.
