= Nellie Johnstone No. 1 =

Oil well in Bartlesville, Oklahoma

- U.S. National Register of Historic Places
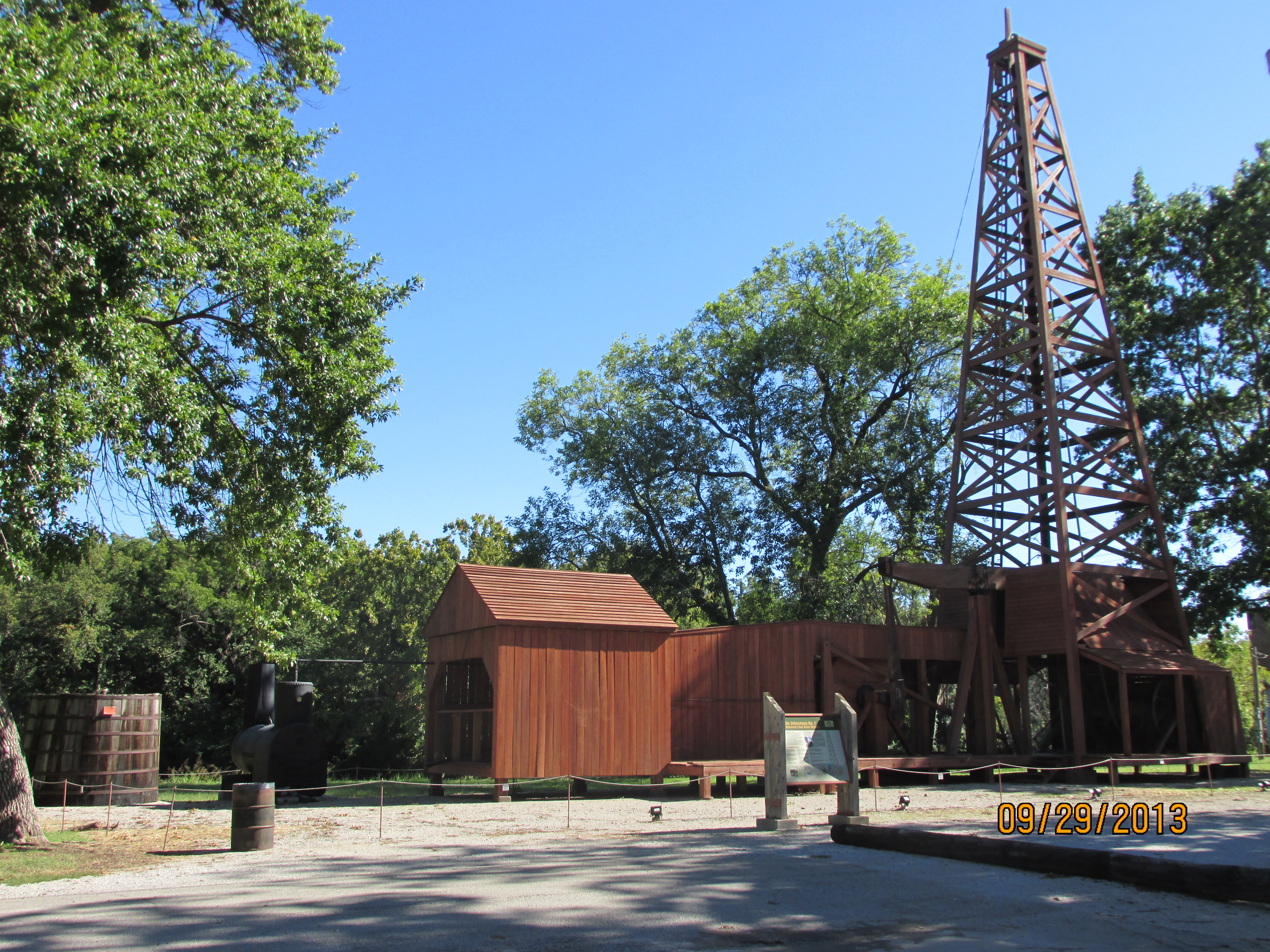
- Replica of Nellie Johnstone No. 1 drilling rig in Bartlesville, Oklahoma. Photo taken September 29, 2013

- Location within Oklahoma Location within the United States
- Location: Johnstone Park, Bartlesville, Oklahoma
- Coordinates: 36°45′23″N 95°58′19″W
- Area: 10 acres (4.0 ha)
- Built: 1897
- Built by: Cudahy Oil Co.
- NRHP reference No.: 72001077
- Added to NRHP: April 11, 1972

Nellie Johnstone No. 1 was the first commercially productive oil well in Oklahoma (at that time in Indian Territory). Completed on April 15, 1897, the well was drilled in the Bartlesville Sand near Bartlesville, opening an era of oil exploration and development in Oklahoma. It was abandoned as a well in 1964. The site was donated to the city of Bartlesville and is now a park, listed on the National Register of Historic Places, featuring a restored drilling rig.

== Background ==
The well was backed by George B. Keeler and William Johnstone, (Note: Keeler and Johnstone were young men initially hired by Jacob Bartles (namesake of the community of Bartlesville) to work in Bartles' general store.) Keeler had been adopted into the Osage Nation and Johnstone had been adopted into the Delaware Nation after marrying Native American women. Keeler and Johnstone left Bartles to open their own store near the Osage Indian Agency on the Caney River, and was named for Johnstone's daughter. Keeler and Johnstone, together with partner Frank Overlees and their Native American wives, leased 200,000 acres (810 km^{2}) from the Cherokee Nation on an area of oil seep and engaged the Cudahy Oil Company to finance the actual drilling operation. (Note: Cudahy Oil Company was owned by businessman Michael Cudahy of Chicago, who is better known as a member of the family that created the Cudahy Meat Packing empire.)

== Organizing and drilling ==
The firm of McBride and Bloom, headquartered in Independence, Kansas, had already been drilling in the Red Fork field. The original drilling rig had been used at a dry hole near Sapulpa. It took two weeks to move it by oxcart 70 miles (110 km) overland to the Bartlesville site. The well went to 1,320 feet (400 m), and was completed using a then-usual technique of placing a "torpedo" (containing a liquid nitroglycerine charge) into the well to fracture the bore and release the oil. Keeler's stepdaughter, Jennie Cass, dropped the "go devil" charge, (Note: Dictionary.com defines go-devil in this context as "...a dart dropped into a well, especially an oil well, to explode a charge of dynamite or nitroglycerine previously placed in a desired position.") causing the explosive to detonate on impact, in front of fifty spectators. (Note: This process was called "shooting the well.") The ensuing gusher produced between 50 and 75 barrels a day, and had to be capped for two years until means could be found to move the oil to a more distant market.

According to Kenny Franks' article in the Encyclopedia of Oklahoma History & Culture, the Nellie Johnstone well had not been properly sealed before it was capped. Oil continued seeping into the sump while the well was blocked, eventually overflowing into the nearby Caney River. During the unusually cold winter that followed, a group of children ice skating on the frozen river, built a bonfire to keep themselves warm. Somehow the fire spread close to the oil seep, igniting it. The fire then spread to the Nellie Johnstone, causing major damage to the facility.

The well was uncapped in 1900, after the Kansas, Oklahoma Central and Southwestern Railway, later acquired by Atchison, Topeka and Santa Fe Railroad, came to Bartlesville, stimulating the development of the Bartlesville field by offering to transport crude to market in Neodesha, Kansas. (Note: The well produced more than 100 thousand barrels (16×10^{3} m^{3}) of oil in its lifetime, before it was capped in 1948.) Nellie Johnstone Cannon, who was six years old at the time the well was drilled and named for her, was granted the land on which the well was drilled by allotment through her Native American ancestry. (Note: Nellie Johnstone Cannon was a descendant of Delaware chief Charles Journeycake.) She sold the land to Bartlesville in 1917. The area is now Johnstone Park.

== Creation of Johnstone Park ==
A replica drilling rig was built over the well in 1948, while the rig was still producing. After the Johnstone No. 1 well was abandoned in 1963, and interest in maintaining the site as a historical monument had begun to grow, the rig scene was reconstructed, using redwood timbers for the derrick. The derrick was rebuilt in 2008.

The well site was listed on the National Register of Historic Places in 1972.
