= Gassi Touil =

Oil field in Algeria; passage in Algeria

Coordinates: 30°31′N 6°28′E

Location of Gassi Touil in Algeria

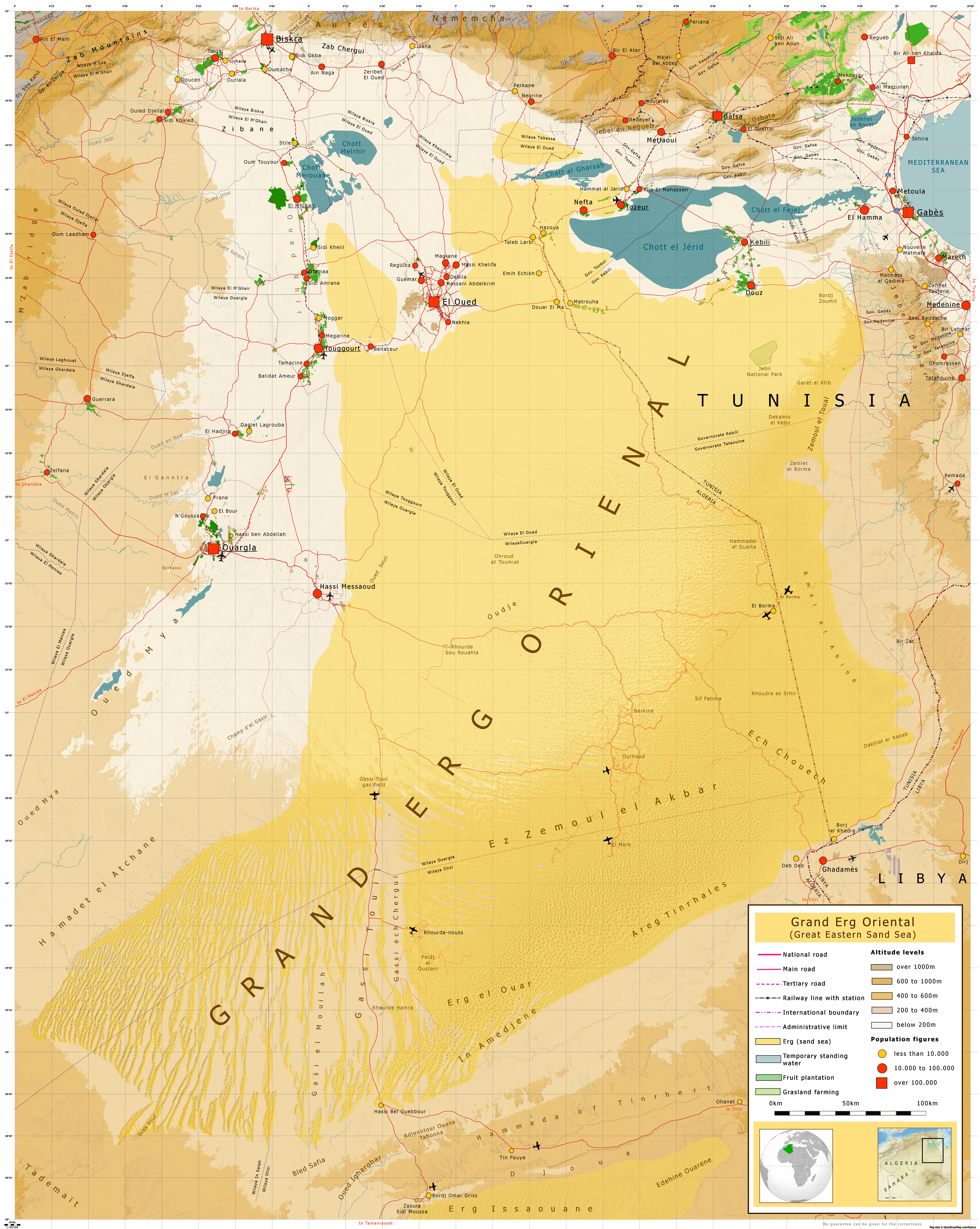
Grand Erg Oriental: The gas field is located slightly below the center.

Gassi Touil is the name of two geographical locations:

- A specific passage (corridor) between chains of dunes in the southern part of the Grand Erg Oriental in the Algerian Sahara
- The name of a large natural gas field in this gassi.

Passages between longitudinal dunes are called gassi, when they consist of hard-packed reg (gravel). Gassi Touil is about 240 km long, up to 20 km wide, and it runs in a north–south direction. The national road RN 3 from Constantine on the Mediterranean via Hassi Messaoud to Djanet in southeastern Algeria passes through here. In the 19th century, caravans from Ouargla already used this route to the south. Geologically, it is an outlying part of the Berkine Basin, itself a region of the Ghadames Basin that extends into Tunisia. The surface of the wider environment is dominated by extensive sand dune fields.

The Gassi Touil natural gas field is located at the northernmost point of the gassi, within the commune of Hassi Messaoud. It is the site of a major liquefied natural gas development project, in which natural gas extracted from the Gassi Touil field will be piped to a liquefaction plant at Djedid. The project was initially developed by Spanish firms Repsol and Gas Natural, but their contract was terminated in 2007 by the Algerian state oil company Sonatrach, which elected to pursue the project on its own.

On November 6, 1961, a gas well fire broke out at Gassi Touil, becoming known as the Devil's Cigarette Lighter. It was finally extinguished on April 28, 1962, by well fire specialist Red Adair.

The field also produces oil, first discovered in 1961, from 38 wells as of 2008.

== See also ==
- Grand Erg Oriental
