= Vermilion Block 380 platform =

US offshore platform in the Gulf of Mexico

Coordinates: 28°12′N 92°12′W

History

United States
- Name: Vermilion Block 380
- Fate: Exploded

The Vermilion Block 380 A Platform is a fixed offshore platform located in 340 ft (104 m) of water approximately 110 mi (180 km) off the Louisiana coast in the Gulf of Mexico. The platform was originally installed as an oil and gas drilling and production platform in early 1980.

== Mariner Energy ==
The platform was owned by Mariner Energy, Inc., an oil and gas exploration company based in One Briar Lake Plaza in Westchase, Houston, Texas. In 2010, Apache Corporation bought Mariner Energy for $2.7 billion. The acquisition was completed on November 10, 2010.

== Design ==
As viewed from the surface, the platform appears to be of a traditional four-pile design. However, the design incorporates four exterior skirt piles in order to provide additional stability at the base. These skirt piles do not extend all of the way from the mudline to the water surface. The eight piles, four main and four skirt, that secure the platform to the seafloor are 5 ft (2 m) in diameter and extend more than 300 ft (91 m) below the mudline.

It was producing approximately 9.2 million cubic feet (260,000 cubic metres) of natural gas and 58,800 US gallons (1,400 bbl) of oil per day.

== Location ==
The platform was located at the Vermilion Block 38 in the Gulf of Mexico about 80 miles (130 km) south of Vermilion Bay.

== Explosion ==
The rig exploded and caught on fire on September 2, 2010. The platform was off-line for maintenance at the time the incident occurred. The flames from the explosion could be seen 100 mi (160 km) off the Louisiana coast. Thirteen workers were occupying the platform at the time of the explosion. All of the workers were rescued from the ocean, with one person sustaining injuries. The rescue vessel Crystal Clear rescued the crew members, all of whom wore type I life jackets at the time of rescue. All went to a hospital in Houma, Louisiana.

== See also ==
- Deepwater Horizon
