= Boots & Coots =

American well control company

Boots & Coots is a well control company and has international offices throughout the globe within Halliburton. It was founded in 1978 by Asger "Boots" Hansen, Jr. (May 29, 1926 – June 16, 2019) and Edward O. "Coots" Matthews (April 23, 1923 – March 31, 2010), veterans of the Red Adair Service and Marine Company. The two companies extinguished approximately one third of the more than 700 oil well fires set in Kuwait by retreating Iraqi soldiers in the Gulf War. This work was featured in the 1992 film Lessons of Darkness.

In 1997, the company was purchased by International Well Control, the successor of the Red Adair Company. The company worked with Halliburton in Iraq in the aftermath of the Iraq War. There were only nine fires to deal with, far fewer than the number from the previous war. In spite of signing a two-year contract including renewal options with Halliburton in 2004 to continue operating in southern Iraq, the company faced an uncertain future.

By the end of 2007, the company had increased revenues to $105.3 million by diversifying from emergency response services to well intervention services, which now comprise the majority of the revenue it generates.

On April 9, 2010, it was announced that Halliburton would acquire Boots and Coots for $3 per share, valuing the deal at approximately $240 million. On April 12, 2010, Robbins Umeda LLC reported it had launched an investigation into "possible breaches of fiduciary duty and other violations of state law by the Board of Directors of Boots & Coots, Inc." with regard to the deal. The Halliburton acquisition was completed on September 17, 2010.
