= Relief well =

Construction tactic to relieve pressure

Relief wells are used both in the natural gas and petroleum industry and in flood control.

== Fossil fuels ==
In the natural gas and petroleum industry, a relief well is drilled to intersect an oil or gas well that has experienced a blowout. Specialized liquid, such as heavy (dense) drilling mud followed by cement, can then be pumped down the relief well in order to stop the flow from the reservoir in the damaged well.

The first use of a relief well was in Texas in the mid-1930s when one was drilled to pump water into an oil well that had cratered and caught on fire.

== Flood control ==
In flood control, a different type of relief well is used adjacent to earthen levees to relieve the pressure on the lake or river side of the levee and thus to prevent the collapse of the levee. The greater flow of water in the water source, typically during a flood, creates a pressure gradient such that more water infiltrates the soil of the levee. Water may then flow through the soil towards the dry side of the levee, resulting in sand boil, liquefaction of the soil, and ultimately destruction of the levee. Relief wells act like valves to relieve the water pressure and allow excess water to be diverted safely, for example, to a canal. Relief wells can prevent sand boils from occurring by relieving the water pressure as described.

== References and external links ==
- "How a relief well works | Gulf of Mexico response | BP".
- "IEEE Spectrum: How to Drill A Relief Well". 30 July 2010.
- "Relief Well Design Approach: HHD Case Study" (PDF).
