= Hellfighters (film) =

1968 American film by Andrew V. McLaglen

- Original theatrical poster
- Directed by: Andrew V. McLaglen
- Screenplay by: Clair Huffaker
- Produced by: Robert Arthur
- Starring: John Wayne; Katharine Ross; Jim Hutton; Jay C. Flippen; Bruce Cabot; Vera Miles
- Cinematography: William H. Clothier
- Edited by: Folmar Blangsted
- Music by: Leonard Rosenman
- Color process: Technicolor
- Production company: Universal Pictures
- Distributed by: Universal Pictures
- Release date: November 27, 1968
- Running time: 121 minutes
- Country: United States
- Language: English
- Box office: $3.75 million (U.S./Canada rentals)

Hellfighters is a 1968 American adventure film directed by Andrew V. McLaglen and starring John Wayne, Katharine Ross, Jim Hutton, and Vera Miles. The movie depicts a group of oil well firefighters, and is based loosely on the life of Red Adair. Adair, "Boots" Hansen, and "Coots" Matthews served as technical advisers on the film.

== Plot ==
Chance Buckman is the head of a Houston-based oil-well firefighting outfit. With a team that includes Joe Horn, Greg Parker, and George Harris, Chance travels around the world putting out blazes at well heads from industrial accident, explosion, or terrorist attack. Chance enjoys the thrills, but longs for ex-wife Madelyn. She divorced him 20 years earlier, taking their daughter Letitia with her, because Madelyn could not bear to see her husband risk his life. Though they love each other, Madelyn could not deal with her terror that Chance might be badly injured or burn to death in a fire.

While extinguishing a burning wellhead, Chance suffers a near-fatal accident when he is crushed by a bulldozer blade. Against his wishes, his daughter Letitia (Tish) visits him in the hospital, summoned by his old friend and former firefighting partner Jack Lomax and fetched by Greg Parker in the Buckman Company's corporate jet. She also pursues Greg Parker to a well fire in Louisiana despite Greg's notorious reputation for using fires to pick up women (generally, any woman he takes to a fire ends up in bed with him). In the case of Buckman's spitfire of a daughter, however, after considerable initial friction, Greg and Tish fall in love and marry five days after their first meeting. In spite of Greg's reputation, Buckman comes to trust his daughter's choice and accepts Greg into the family. Madelyn, projecting her own fears onto her daughter, though gracious, is rather less accepting, despite her liking for Greg.

Greg suspects that his new father-in-law is growing increasingly protective of him after the marriage in an effort to protect his daughter from heartbreak should her new husband be harmed or killed. Tish wishes to see the fires that her husband and father fight, which neither man encourages. Her father relents and allows her to accompany Greg into the field.

Chance, trying to reunite with his ex-wife, leaves the Buckman Company to accept an executive position with his old friend Jack Lomax on the board of directors of Lomax Oil as a way to win her back. Chance gives his company to his son-in-law as a "wedding present", although Greg's pride compels him to tell Buckman he "doesn't want any gifts" and that he will "pay twice what it's worth." Greg and Tish begin traveling the world to put out oil fires. Soon, the older couple announce that they will remarry, to the delight of Tish. Madelyn is happy to see her husband in a safe job, but before too long, Chance becomes bored with corporate life and longs to be back in the field. As Jack Lomax earlier told Tish, "Your father is the best there is at what he does. No man can walk away from that."

Greg encounters problems with a fire in Venezuela—five oil wells in a tight line burning all at once, further compounded by guerrillas who are trying to undermine the operation. He asks Chance to return and help fight the fire. Chance does so without hesitation. Buckman goes to Venezuela in a Texas Air National Guard transport full of firefighting gear, unaware that Madelyn and Tish have followed him to Caracas. Madelyn uses Jack Lomax's influence with the president of Venezuela to get Tish and herself to the oilfield where the fire is burning. Madelyn declares "This is it for me," in the sense that it will either make or break her ability to deal with the fires once and for all, fully aware that her relationship with Chance is on the line.

The Hellfighters put out the fires with the help of the Venezuelan Army, while under attack by rebel warplanes that strafe the oilfield. Madelyn explodes in anger at what she perceives as the Venezuelans' inability to protect the team from the unexpected air raid, railing at the Venezuelan army and civil officials for allowing the guerrillas to get close enough to attack. Chance pulls her away during her tirade. She snaps, "Damned if I understand your attitude!", to which he replies, "It's very simple—you'll do." When Greg asks Tish for her take on it, she just smiles and says, "I think we ought to get her a tin hat," referring to the bright red hardhats with the Buckman Company logo worn by the Hellfighters.

== Cast ==
- John Wayne as Chance Buckman
- Katharine Ross as Tish Buckman
- Jim Hutton as Greg Parker
- Vera Miles as Madelyn Buckman
- Jay C. Flippen as Jack Lomax
- Bruce Cabot as Joe Horn
- Barbara Stuart as Irene Foster
- Edward Faulkner as George Harris
- Pedro Gonzalez Gonzalez as Hernando (Houseboy) (uncredited)
- Cactus Pryor as Chance's Doctor
- Edmund Hashim as Colonel Valdez
- Edward Colmans as Deputy Minister Caldez
- Alberto Morin as General Lopez
- Howard Finch as Ed 'Cal' Calhoun
- Valentin de Vargas as Amal Bokru
- Frances Fong as Madame Loo
- Laraine Stephens as Helen Meadows
- Alan Caillou as Harry York
- John Alderson as Jim Hatch
- Big John Hamilton as Lipman

== Production ==
Red Adair had been fighting fires since 1946. He was well known in the industry, but became more generally known in 1962 after extinguishing the Devil's Cigarette Lighter Sahara gas well fire. Clair Huffaker wrote an original script, which was bought by Universal in February 1967. Robert Arthur was assigned to produce. John Wayne agreed to star in November 1967.

Vera Miles played Katharine Ross's mother, yet Miles is only nine years older than Ross. Wayne made the film after The Green Berets. It reteamed him with Andrew McLaglen, with whom Wayne had made McLintock! (1963), and Jim Hutton, who had been in The Green Berets.

This was the first film for which Wayne was paid $1 million. Unlike many of Wayne's films around this time, it was not made for his own company.

Much of the filming took place on the Snodgrass Ranch just outside of Casper, Wyoming. During filming, a catering truck crashed into Wayne's trailer while the star was inside, but he was not injured.

== Critical reception ==
Hellfighters was for the most part negatively received, with criticism aimed chiefly at the overlong plot and dull characterizations. The film garnered a 13% rating on Rotten Tomatoes. Roger Ebert of the Chicago Sun-Times described it as a "slow-moving, talkative, badly plotted bore". A. H. Weiler of The New York Times wrote that John Wayne made "actionful, if not stirringly meaningful, child's play of exotic disasters" and remarked that "the unrestrained cast and director maintain a welcome sense of humor".

== See also ==
- List of American films of 1968
- John Wayne filmography
- List of firefighting films
