= Environmental impact of the Gulf wars =

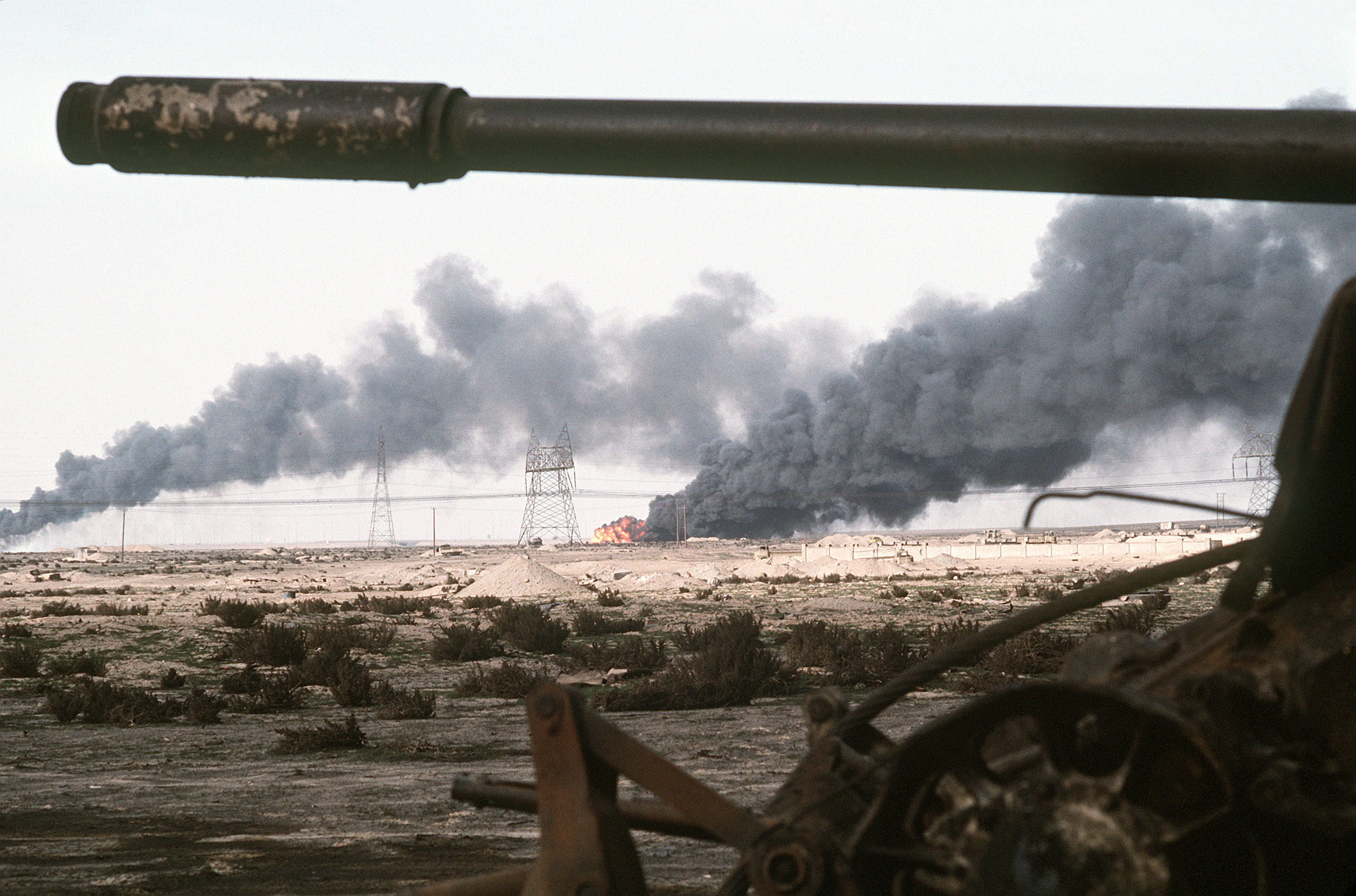
Disabled tank and burning oil field

The First Gulf War (1990) and the 2003 Iraq War, also known as the Second Gulf War, brought about significant environmental degradation that still impacts the area today. The Persian Gulf countries consist of: the UAE, Bahrain, Oman, Qatar, Saudi Arabia, Iraq and Kuwait. Iran and Kuwait faced the most environmental damage after the wars due to their central position in the conflict.

Many of the environmental issues faced in the Gulf can be traced to the deployment of chemical agents. These chemicals have impacted the health of both military and civilian individuals involved in the Persian Gulf.

This article presents the effects of the First and Second Gulf Wars on the environment as well as the health of those involved in the conflict.

== Notable events during the Gulf Wars and their environmental impact ==
=== First Gulf War ===
- 2 August 1990: Iraq begins their invasion of Kuwait. Resolution 660 is passed by the UN. British and American troops deploy the first troops into Saudi Arabia, launching Operation Desert Shield.
- 17 January 1991: Iraq refuses to withdraw from Kuwait. The coalition responds with the launch of an aerial bombing campaign under the codename Operation Desert Storm.
  - In just over a month, the coalition dropped over 85,000 tonnes of bombs in retaliation. The detonation of these explosive weapons caused severe damage to those in the target area and the surrounding environment.
    - Research has suggested that the destruction of infrastructure by explosives can lead to the release of toxic materials and waste such as asbestos, hydrogen sulfide, and ammonia.
- 23 February 1991: Iraq attempts to bring Israel into the conflict by launching missiles in Haifa and Tel Aviv. The coalition proceeds with a ground invasion of Kuwait and parts of Iraq.
  - In response to this increased military involvement, Iraqi troops were tasked with setting fire to the Kuwaiti oil fields during their retreat, enacting a form of scorched earth policy. 608 oil wells were set ablaze to deter the advancement of the coalition's troops, an effort which proved to be unsuccessful.
- 28 February 1991: Iraqui troops are expelled from Kuwait and Kuwaiti independence is restored.
- April 1991: First oil wells were capped and the fires extinguished by a team of Kuwaiti firefighters and international relief efforts. Without intervention, the fires were predicted to last anywhere from two to five years.
- 6 November 1991: Last oil well was capped.
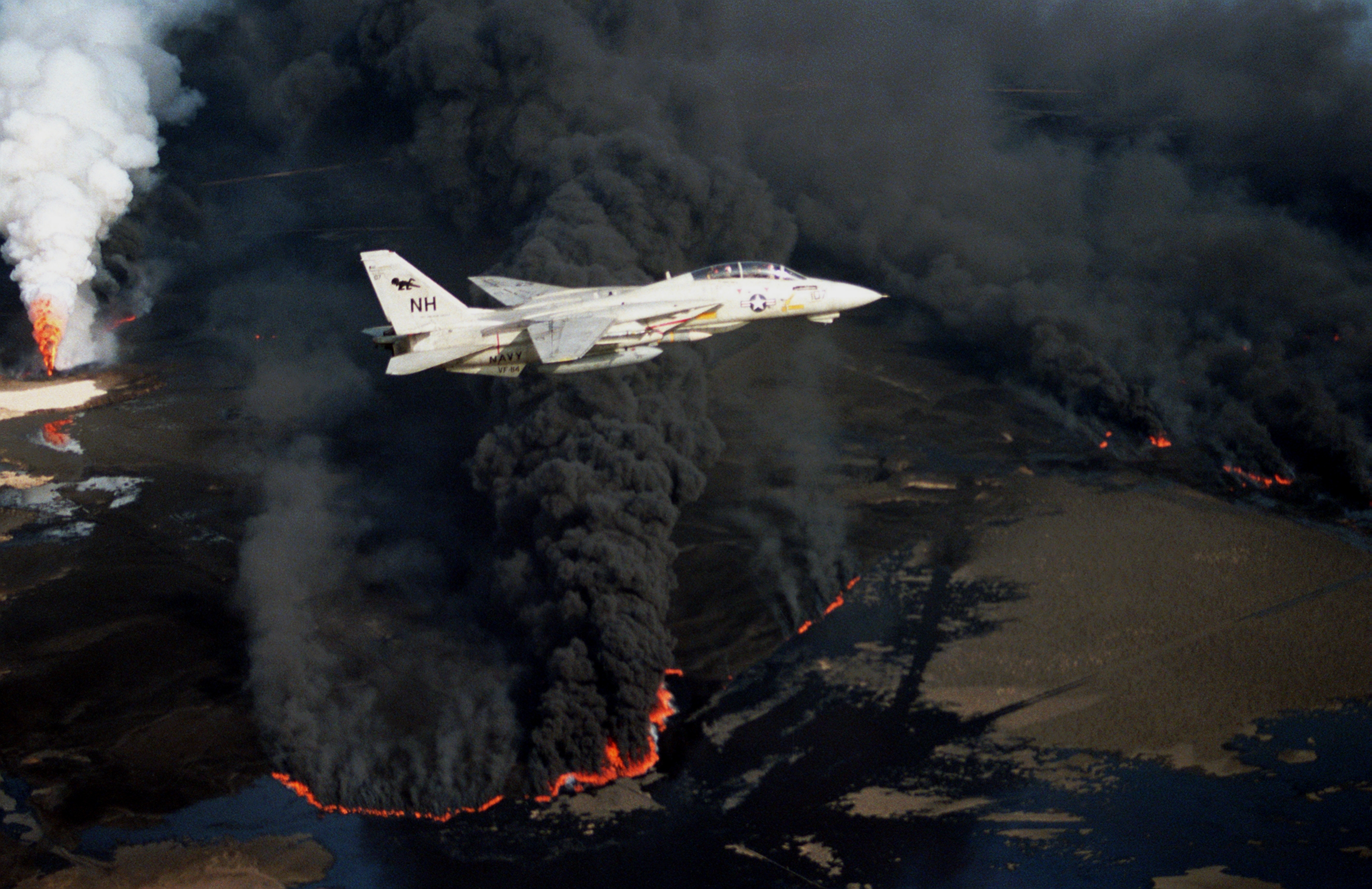
  Plumes of black smoke from Kuwaiti oil well fires
  - The environmental damage caused by the oil fires was arguably the most impactful environmental catastrophe related to the First Gulf War. Discussion at the 1991 World Climate Conference in January included talks of predicted nuclear winters, acid rain, and immediate global warming spreading into Europe and Asia from the Persian epicentre.
  - The combustion of oil from the fires polluted Kuwait's air with toxic gasses like hydrogen sulfide and sulfur dioxide. The decreased air quality led to an increase in respiratory diseases amongst the residents of Kuwait and surrounding countries.

=== 2003 Invasion of Iraq (Second Gulf War) ===
- 20 March 2003: The coalition organizes an air strike on the presidential palace in Baghdad. In the following days, the coalition begins a full invasion of Iraq.
- 21 March 2003: First reports of Iraqi soldiers setting fire to Iraqi oil wells are published in a repeat of the scorched earth tactics used in 1991; over the course of the war, around 40 oil wells were set ablaze.
- 1 May 2003: President George W. Bush announced that major combat operations and attacks would be ending. Period of occupation begins.
  - The U.S. has been accused of using white phosphorus in their invasion of Iraq. The use of chemical weapons in war is banned under international law, making these accusations controversial. As well as its use being highly controversial, white phosphorus when left to degrade can react with other chemicals to create highly toxic compounds which can stay active for extended periods of time.
  - During both Gulf Wars, the U.S. used depleted uranium to harden ammunition and tanks, maximizing the damage caused by their weapons. On impact, depleted uranium turns into small particles that can easily be inhaled or spread through the air. These particles pollute soil and water systems, and have been shown to be harmful to human health.
- Leading up to the COP26 summit in 2021, The Red Cross commented on the environmental aftermath of the war, highlighting issues such as unexploded weapons and land mines. They also addressed the additional pressure put on the environment by the large scale displacement and the movement of military equipment and troops.
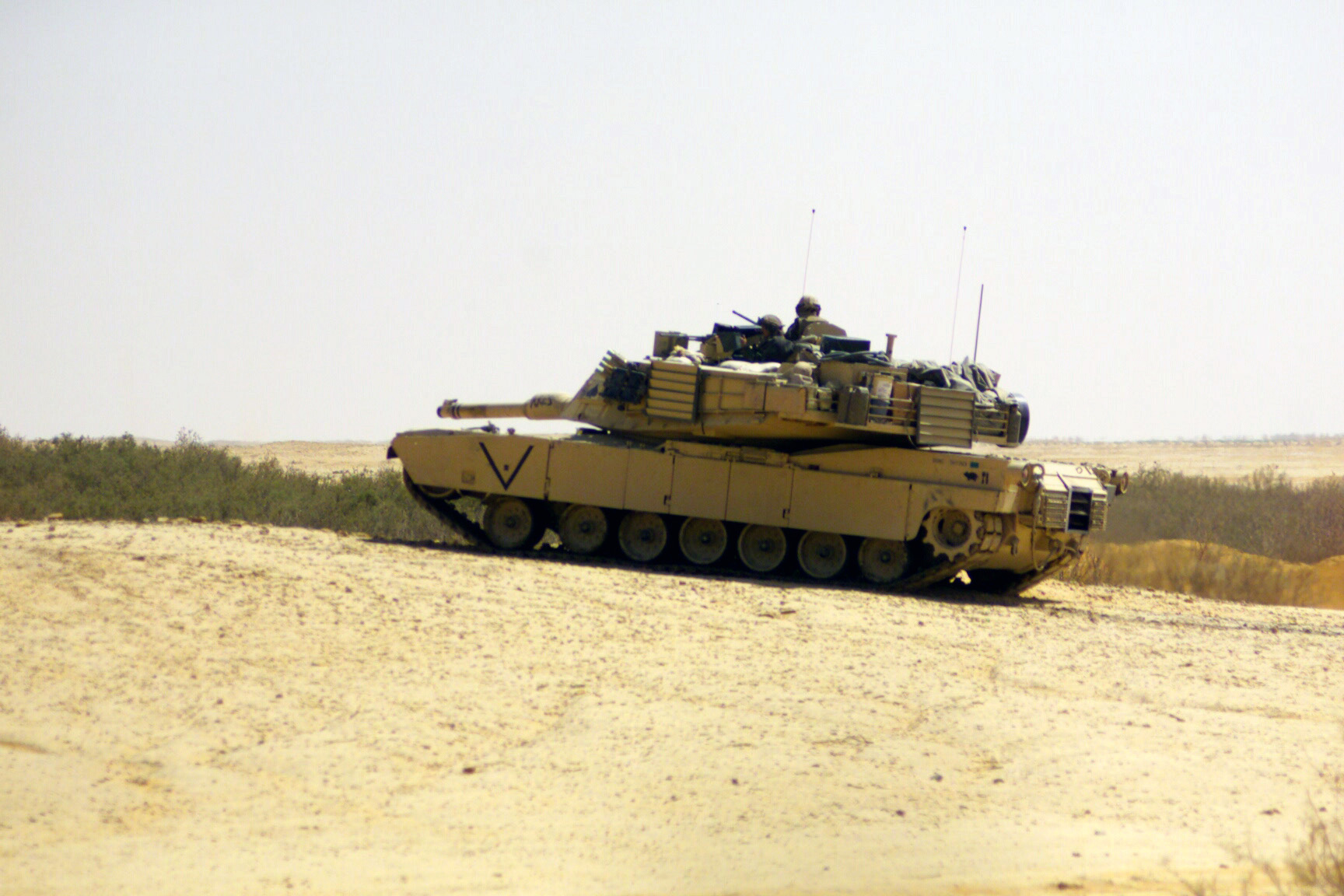
  US Marine Corps (USMC) personnel in an M1A1 Abrams Main Battle Tanks (MBT)

== The effects ==
=== Environment ===
The environmental impact of the Gulf War of 1991 was unprecedented. Approximately 3.5 million tons of crude oil were released into the desert, while another 800,000 tons of oil spilled into the Persian Gulf.

The fires lit by the Iraqi army leaked 60 million barrels of oil into the desert, creating 250 million oil lakes. These lakes covered approximately 50 square kilometers of the desert, changing its natural environment.

==== Marine Ecosystem ====
A series of oil spills occurred near the end of the war, with the most significant one being the Sea Island Terminal Oil Spill on January 19, 1991. By the end of the first Gulf War, approximately 7-9 million barrels of oil had spilled into the Persian Gulf.

The Saudi coast suffered extensive damage over the distance of more than 100 miles. Oil, up to 15 inches deep in certain areas, devastated the nesting grounds of endangered sea turtles, birds, fisheries, and shrimp-spawning areas. Beaches, tide pools, and seagrass beds were damaged, and thousands of rare herons, flamingos, and other bird species were killed.

==== Changes in Climate ====
Moreover, the environmental repercussions extended over 1000 kilometres away to southern Turkey, where black acidic rain fell in March 1991. This rain was a result of carbon particles from the burning Kuwaiti oil fires. The rain was observed in Iraq, Iran, and Syria, affecting Iranian crops and water supply.

The large particles in the air absorbed the heat from the Sun, resulting in a 10 °C drop in temperatures in Kuwait. Areas up to 750 kilometers away were affected and cooled by 2-8 °C on average. This temperature change was recorded from February to October 1991.

==== Waste Disposal ====
The 1991 Gulf War damaged sewage treatment plants in Kuwait, leading to the daily release of nearly 50,000 cubic meters of raw sewage into Kuwait Bay .

==== Air Pollution ====
By February 26, 1991, approximately 800 oil wells still burned in Kuwait, continuing for several months. The resulting air pollution released significant amounts of soot and carbon into the atmostphere.

The atmospheric pollution from the oil fires had health implications for humans. Heavy metals found in dust samples from the Kuwaiti atmosphere were also found in the brain tumors of Kuwaiti civilians.

=== Health ===
==== The use of chemicals agents ====
After the Gulf Wars, the United States Department of Veterans Affairs (VA) and other researchers assessed the potential causes of health issues among veterans, including exposure to chemical and biological weapons.

The use of chemical agents by the U.S. army and Iraqi forces remains a subject of debate. In 1997, the US government stated that evidence of nerve agents had been found in Iraqi warheads stored in Khamisiyah. These warheads were demolished upon the ending of the war, possibly exposing over 100,000 members of the U.S. military to toxins.

A study by the Boston School of Public Health has revealed a correlation between veterans deployed in Iraq and of post-war health symptoms. This report states that:

"Persian Gulf-deployed veterans were more likely to report neurological, pulmonary, gastrointestinal, cardiac, dermatological, musculoskeletal, psychological and neuropsychological system symptoms than German veterans."

==== Gulf War Syndrome ====
The term "Gulf War illness" or "Gulf War syndrome" refers to the illness and neurological symptoms of "fatigue, muscle and joint pain, headaches, loss of memory and poor sleep" experienced by veterans after the 1991 Gulf War. This syndrome was associated with exposure to depleted uranium, sarin nerve agents, organophosphate pesticides, and, to a lesser extent, exposure to oil well fires, the Anthrax vaccine, and combat stress.

==== Cancer ====
In the decade following Gulf War I, veterans and Iraqi physicians reported a sharp increase in severe health problems, including cancer. These health issues were attributed to the use of depleted uranium bullets by the United States. Depleted uranium is known to be carcinogenic, and has been associated with neurological health problems.

The depleted uranium weapons used in the war contaminated Iraqi soil, leading to long term radiation hazards. By 2012, lung cancer, breast cancer, Leukemia, and Lymphoma cases had doubled or tripled in some areas of Iraq.

==== Birth Defects ====
An increase in birth defects following the Gulf Wars has been reported by Iraqi physicians. The use of chemical agents in Iraq could explain the prevalence of birth defects in post-war Iraq. It must be acknowledged, however, that there is insufficient research on the rate of Iraqi birth defects prior to the war. The lack of research on Iraqi birth defects before 1991 makes it difficult to conclude if the war was the cause of the reported birth defects.

== Cleanup ==
Following the Gulf War Oil Spill in 1991, cleanup efforts were organized by the Saudi Arabian Emergency Response Center. Clean-up crews removed oil from the surface of the Gulf using skimmer ships. Coastlines and wildlife were cleaned using methods tested by the Emergency Response Center, which had conducted research on oil spill response procedures. The cleanup effort was a combined project involving scientists, government agencies, and volunteers .

In response to the fires set in the First Gulf War, Kuwait created a plan to extinguish the fires, working with global firefighting companies. When it was safe for exiled Kuwaiti officials to return to Kuwait, they executed the plan. Saltwater from the Gulf was transported through oil pipes and used to extinguish the flames. The oil lakes formed were removed to prevent future fires, and extra care was taken to avoid detonating the large amount of unexploded weapons that remained in Kuwait after the war.

Kuwait is still committed to the clearing of ocean debris from the First Gulf War. Since 1999, the Kuwaiti Diver's Association has been clearing the Persian Gulf's waters of military waste. In that time, divers have extracted two cannons and seven shells from the Kuwaiti seabed.

== Legal liability for the environmental damage of Gulf Wars: the UNCC mechanism ==
Two months after the end of the 1990-1991 Gulf War, an unprecedented post-war mechanism called the United Nations Compensation Commission (UNCC) was established. The primary purpose of this mechanism was to assist neighbouring nations in recovering from the personal and financial damages of the war and to minimize the environmental harm caused by the conflict.

In fact, the Gulf Wars provided environmental activists with an opportunity to discuss legislation in the international environmental field that could prevent future environmental crises.

Gulf countries were significantly damaged by the war and Iraq's oil revenues were seen as a possible source of funding for reparations. The UNCC was established with the objective of processing claims and compensation for those harmed in Iraq's illegal invasion and occupation of Kuwait. The 2.69 million claims that were processed were categorized based on the claimant and the type of compensation sought.

Multiple factors were considered, including personal injuries, fatalities, financial loss, expenses incurred by neighbouring countries for hosting refugees, damage to businesses, and damage to government properties. Environmental damage and depletion of natural resources fell under the "F4" sub-category.

Expert panels evaluated 170 F4 claims originating from 12 countries (Australia, Canada, Germany, Iran, Jordan, Kuwait, the Netherlands, Saudi Arabia, Syria, Turkey, the UK, and the U.S.) and awarded a total of $5,261 million to 10 countries. This amounted to only 6.2% of the total claims made, and was paid out in five installments over a span of five years. Strict oversight measures were implemented to ensure that the funds were used as specified, with regular reporting being conducted. All payments have now been concluded, although certain projects have taken more time than others to be finalized.
