= Environmental terrorism =

Term for unlawful or harmful acts that destroy environmental resources

Environmental terrorism consists of one or more unlawful or even hostile actions that harm or destroy environmental resources or deprive others of their use. It is different to environmental vandalism, which is a rather permitted but ethically disputed destruction of environment.

== Definition ==
There are academic and semantic difficulties in defining "terrorism" and specifically "environmental terrorism", but discussions of environmental terrorism are growing with a focus on identifying possible risks to natural resources or environmental features. Some, including in the military argue that attacks on natural resources can now cause more deaths, property damage, political chaos, and other adverse effects than in previous years.

Chalecki distinguishes between environmental terrorism and eco-terrorism. She notes that environmental terrorism can be defined "as the unlawful use of force against in situ environmental resources so as to deprive populations of their benefit(s) and/or destroy other property". In contrast, eco-terrorism is the destruction of property in the interest of saving the environment from human encroachment and destruction. More concisely, environmental terrorism involves targeting natural resources. Eco-terrorism involves targeting the built environment such as roads, buildings and trucks, in defense of natural resources. Other analysts may fail to distinguish between these different threats.

== Examples ==
Children of Fire Initiative, an organization believed to be an offshoot of the PKK, claimed responsibility for multiple arson and wildfire attacks in Turkey, including those that happened in 2020.

Illegal burnings of waste in the West Bank have been claimed to be acts of environmental terrorism against Israel as they are one of the main causes of carcinogenic air pollution in Israel.

The Gulf War oil spill, which is estimated to be the biggest oil spill in human history, has been described as a form of environmental terrorism by Iraqi forces.

== See also ==
- Environmental impact of war
- List of environmental issues
- 1989 California medfly attack
