= Gulf oil spill =

Gulf oil spill may refer to:

- Ixtoc I oil spill – Gulf of Mexico 1979
- Gulf War oil spill – Persian Gulf 1991
- Deepwater Horizon oil spill – Gulf of Mexico 2010
