= Kuwaiti oil fires =

Oil wells burned by the Iraqi military during the Gulf War

Kuwaiti oil fires in Al-Maqwa

Kuwaiti oil fires in Al-Maqwa 1991

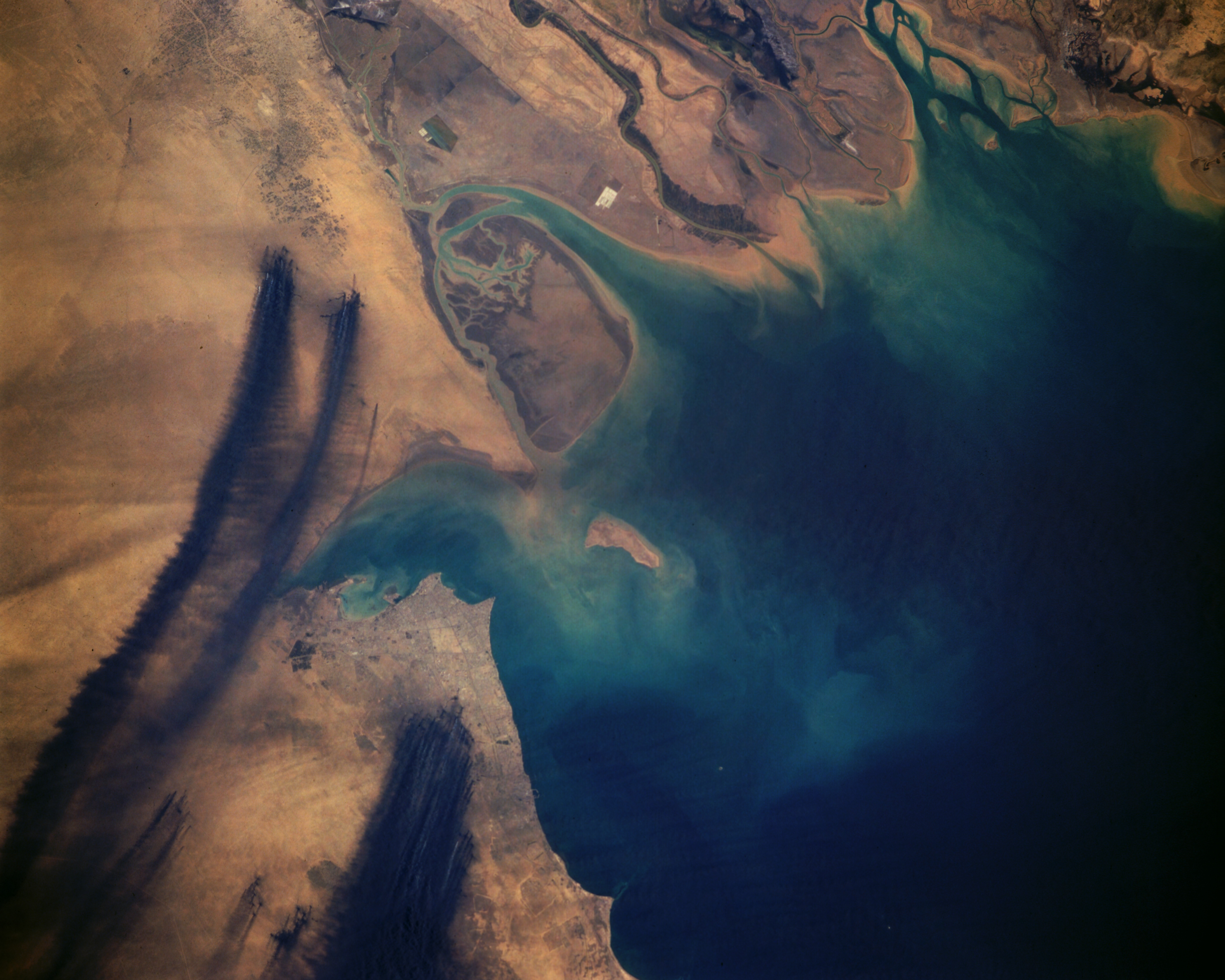
Smoke plumes from a few of the Kuwaiti Oil Fires on April 7, 1991, as seen from Space Shuttle Atlantis during STS-37.

The Kuwaiti oil fires were caused by the Iraqi military setting fire to a reported 605 to 732 oil wells along with an unspecified number of oil-filled low-lying areas, such as oil lakes and fire trenches while retreating from Kuwait in 1991 due to the advances of US-led coalition forces in the Gulf War. The fires were started in January and February 1991, and the first oil well fires were extinguished in early April 1991, with the last well capped on November 6, 1991.

== Motives ==
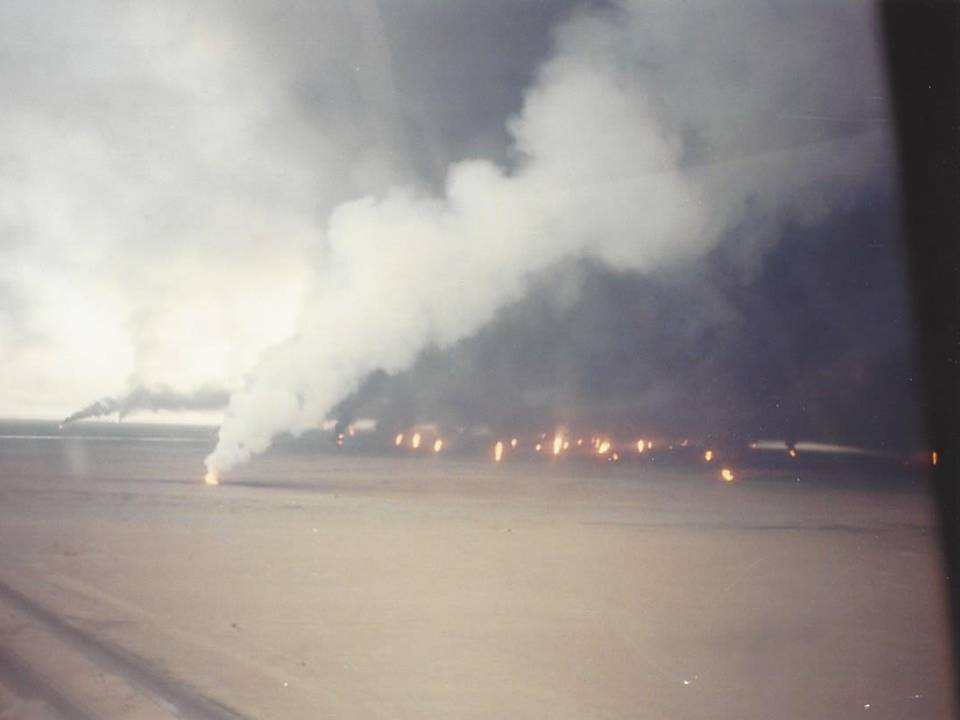
Oil well fires, south of Kuwait City. (Photo taken from UH-60 Blackhawk)

The dispute between Iraq and Kuwait over alleged slant-drilling in the Rumaila oil field was one of the reasons for Iraq's invasion of Kuwait in 1990.

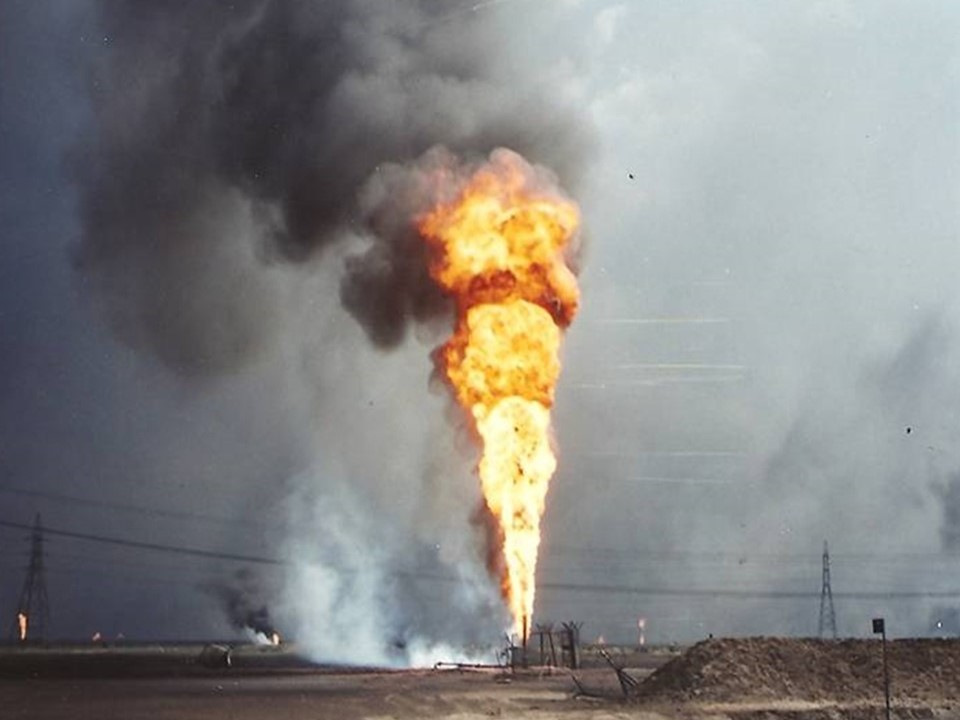
Kuwaiti oil well fire, south of Kuwait City, March, 1991

In addition, Kuwait had been producing oil above treaty limits established by OPEC. By the eve of the Iraqi invasion, Kuwait had set production quotas to almost 1.9 million barrels per day (300,000 m^{3}/d), which coincided with a sharp worldwide drop in the price of oil. By the summer of 1990, Kuwaiti overproduction had become a serious point of contention with Iraq.

Some analysts have speculated that one of Saddam Hussein's main motivations in invading Kuwait was to punish the ruling al-Sabah family in Kuwait for not stopping its policy of overproduction, as well as his reasoning behind the destruction of said wells.

It is also hypothesized that Iraq decided to destroy the oil fields to achieve a military advantage, believing the intense smoke plumes serving as smoke screens created by the burning oil wells would inhibit Coalition offensive airstrikes, foil allied precision guided weapons and spy satellites, and could screen Iraq's military movements. Furthermore, it is thought that Iraq's military leaders may have regarded the heat, smoke, and debris from hundreds of burning oil wells as presenting a formidable area denial obstacle to Coalition forces. The onset of the oil well destruction supports this military dimension to the sabotage of the wells; for example, during the early stage of the Coalition air campaign, the number of oil wells afire was relatively small but the number increased dramatically in late February with the arrival of the ground war.

The Iraqi military combat engineers also released oil into low-lying areas for defensive purposes against infantry and mechanized units along Kuwait's southern border, by constructing several "fire trenches" roughly one kilometre (0.62 mi) long, and three metres (9.8 ft) wide and deep to impede the advance of Coalition ground forces.

The military use of the land based fires should also be seen in context with the coinciding, deliberate, sea based Gulf War oil spill, the apparent strategic goal of which was to foil a potential amphibious landing by U.S. Marines.

== Extent ==
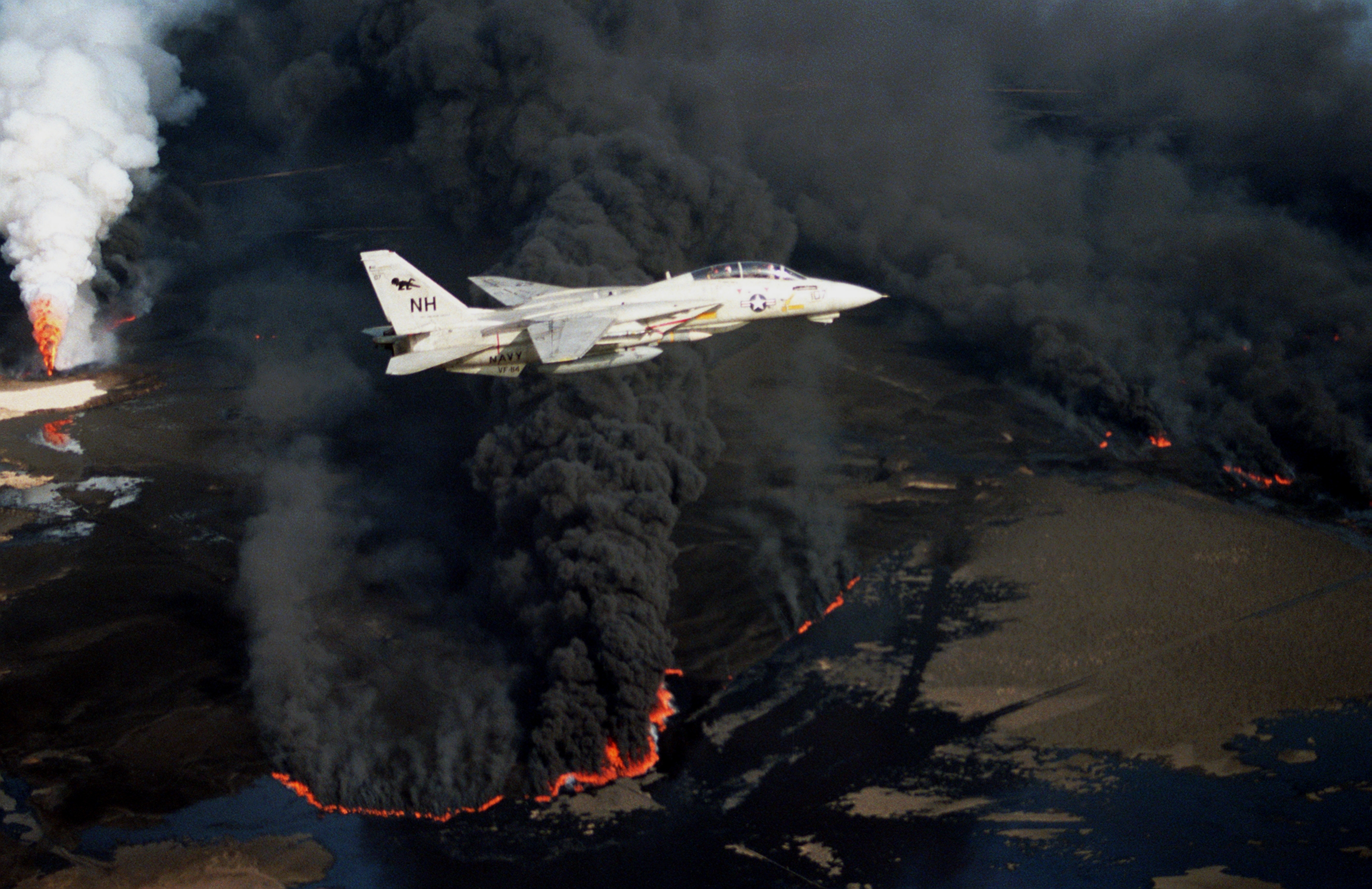
The Kuwaiti oil fires were not just limited to burning oil wells, one of which is seen here in the background, but burning "oil lakes", seen in the foreground, also contributed to the smoke plumes, particularly the sootiest/blackest of them (1991).

As an international coalition under United States command assembled in anticipation of an invasion of Iraqi-occupied Kuwait, the Iraqi regime decided to destroy as much of Kuwait's oil reserves and infrastructure as possible before withdrawing from the country. As early as December 1990, Iraqi forces placed explosive charges on Kuwaiti oil wells. The wells were systematically sabotaged beginning on January 16, 1991, when the allies commenced air strikes against Iraqi targets. On February 8, satellite images detected the first smoke from burning oil wells. The number of oil fires peaked between February 22 and 24, when the allied ground offensive began.

According to the U.S. Environmental Protection Agency's report to Congress, "the retreating Iraqi army set fire to or damaged over 700 oil wells, storage tanks, refineries, and facilities in Kuwait." Estimates placed the number of oil well fires from 605 to 732. A further thirty-four wells had been destroyed by heavy coalition bombing in January. The Kuwait Petroleum Company's estimate as of September 1991 was that there had been 610 fires, out of a total of 749 facilities damaged or on fire along with an unspecified number of oil filled low-lying areas, such as "oil lakes" and "fire trenches". These fires constituted approximately 50% of the total number of oil well fires in the history of the petroleum industry, and temporarily damaged or destroyed approximately 85% of the wells in every major Kuwaiti oil field.

Concerted efforts to bring the fires and other damage under control began in April 1991. During the uncontrolled burning phase from February to April, various sources estimated that the ignited wellheads burnt through between four and six million barrels of crude oil, and between seventy and one hundred million cubic meters of natural gas per day. Seven months later, 441 facilities had been brought under control, while 308 remained uncontrolled. The last well was capped on November 6, 1991. The total amount of oil burned is generally estimated at one billion barrels or just below one percent of Kuwait's entire supply of 104 billion barrels. Daily global oil consumption in 2022 is about 99.4 million barrels; the oil lost to combustion would last 10 days at modern usage rates.

=== Financial losses ===
In March 1991 the accumulated financial losses were estimated to be as much as 10% of 90 billion barrels of Kuwait oil reserves based on a statement made by a Kuwait Oil Company official. With the world prices at the time, the damages would amount to US$157.5 billion.

== Military effects ==
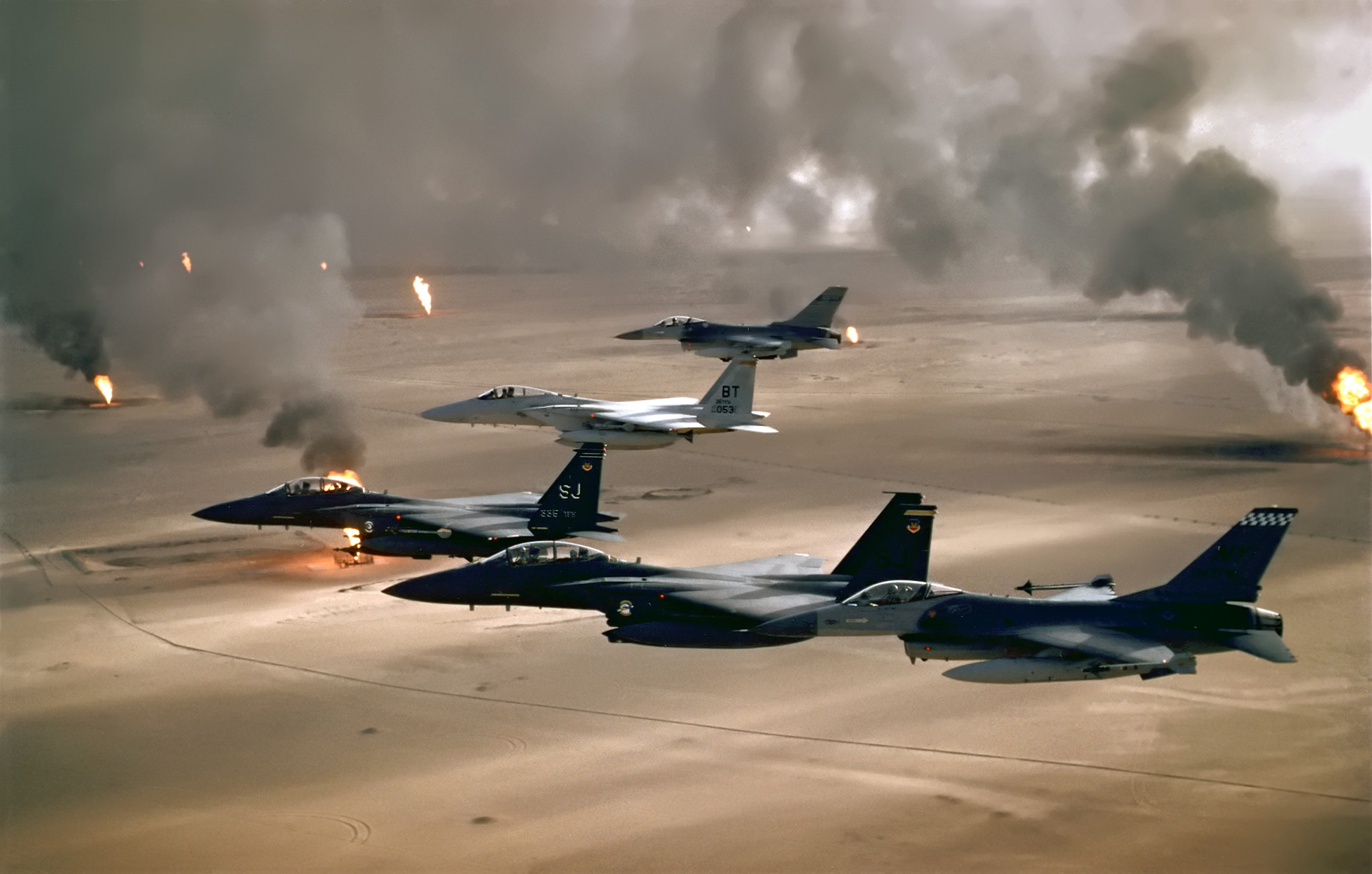
USAF aircraft fly over burning Kuwaiti oil wells (1991).

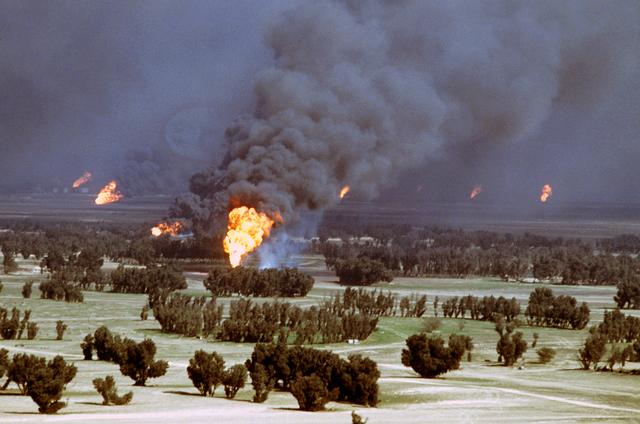
The oil fires caused a dramatic decrease in air quality, causing respiratory problems for many soldiers on the ground without gas masks (1991).

United States Marines approach burning oilfields during ground war of the Gulf War (1991).

On March 21, 1991, a Royal Saudi Air Force C-130H crashed in heavy smoke due to the Kuwaiti oil fires on approach to Ras Mishab Airport, Saudi Arabia. 92 Senegalese soldiers and 6 Saudi crew members were killed, the largest accident among Coalition forces.

The smoke screening was also used by Iraqi anti-armor forces to a successful extent in the Battle of Phase Line Bullet, having aided in achieving the element of surprise against advancing Bradley IFVs, along with increasing the general fog of war.

The fires burned out of control because of the dangers of sending in firefighting crews during the war. Land mines had been placed in areas around the oil wells and military demining was necessary before the fires could be put out. Around 5 million barrels (790,000 m^{3}) of oil were lost each day. Eventually, privately contracted crews extinguished the fires, at a total cost of US$1.5 billion to Kuwait. By that time, however, the fires had burned for approximately ten months, causing widespread pollution.

The fires have been linked with what was later deemed Gulf War syndrome, a chronic disorder afflicting military veterans and civilian workers that include fatigue, muscle pain, and cognitive problems; however, studies have indicated that the firemen who capped the wells did not report any of the symptoms that the soldiers experienced. The cause of Gulf War syndrome has since been ascribed to Sarin nerve agent.

From the perspective of ground forces, apart from the occasional "oil rain" experienced by troops very close to spewing wells, one of the more commonly experienced effects of the oil field fires were the ensuing smoke plumes which rose into the atmosphere and then precipitated or fell out of the air via dry deposition and by rain. The pillar-like plumes frequently broadened and joined up with other smoke plumes at higher altitudes, producing a cloudy grey overcast effect, as only about 10% of all the fires corresponding with those that originated from "oil lakes" produced pure black soot filled plumes, 25% of the fires emitted white to grey plumes, while the remainder emitted plumes with colors between grey and black. For example, one Gulf War veteran stated:

It was like a cloudy day all day long, in fact, we didn’t realize it was smoke at first. The smoke was about 500 feet above us, so we couldn’t see the sky. However, we could see horizontally for long distances with no problem. We knew it was smoke when the mucous from our nostrils started to look black..."

A paper published in 2000 analyzed the degree of exposure by troops to particulate matter, including soot. However, the paper focused more-so on silica sand, which can produce silicosis. The paper included troop medical records, and in its conclusion: "A literature review indicated negligible to nonexistent health risk from other inhaled particulate material (other than silica) during the Gulf War".

== Extinguishing efforts ==
The burning wells needed to be extinguished as, without active efforts, Kuwait would lose billions of dollars in oil revenues. It was predicted by experts that the fires would burn for between two and five years before losing pressure and going out on their own.

The companies responsible for extinguishing the fires initially were Bechtel, Red Adair Company (now sold to Global Industries of Louisiana), Boots and Coots, and Wild Well Control. Safety Boss was the fourth company to arrive but ended up extinguishing and capping the most wells of any other company: 180 of the 600. Other companies including Cudd Well/Pressure Control, Neal Adams Firefighters, and Kuwait Wild Well Killers were also contracted.

According to Larry H. Flak, a petroleum engineer for Boots and Coots International Well Control, 90% of all the 1991 fires in Kuwait were put out with nothing but sea water, sprayed from powerful hoses at the base of the fire. The extinguishing water was supplied to the arid desert region by re-purposing the oil pipelines that prior to the arson attack had pumped oil from the wells to the Persian Gulf. The pipeline had been mildly damaged but, once repaired, its flow was reversed to pump Persian gulf seawater to the burning oil wells. The extinguishing rate was approximately 1 every 7–10 days at the start of efforts but then with experience gained and the removal of the mine fields that surrounded the burning wells, the rate increased to 2 or more per day.

The use of gas turbines to blast a large volume of high velocity water proved popular with firefighters for stubborn fires. A Hungarian team used a converted T-34 tank with two MiG-21 engines mounted to the turret to extinguish 9 fires in 43 days. The machine was known as Big Wind.

In fighting a fire at a directly vertical spewing wellhead, high explosives, such as dynamite were used to create a blast wave that pushes the burning fuel and local atmospheric oxygen away from the well. (This is a similar principle to blowing out a candle.) The flame is removed and the fuel can continue to spill out without igniting. Generally, explosives were placed within 55 gallon drums, the explosives surrounded by fire retardant chemicals, and then the drums are wrapped with insulating material with a horizontal crane being used to bring the drum as close to the burning area as possible.

The firefighting teams titled their occupation as "Operation Desert Hell" after Operation Desert Storm.

== Atmospheric pollution and aerosol hazards ==
=== Predicted consequences ===
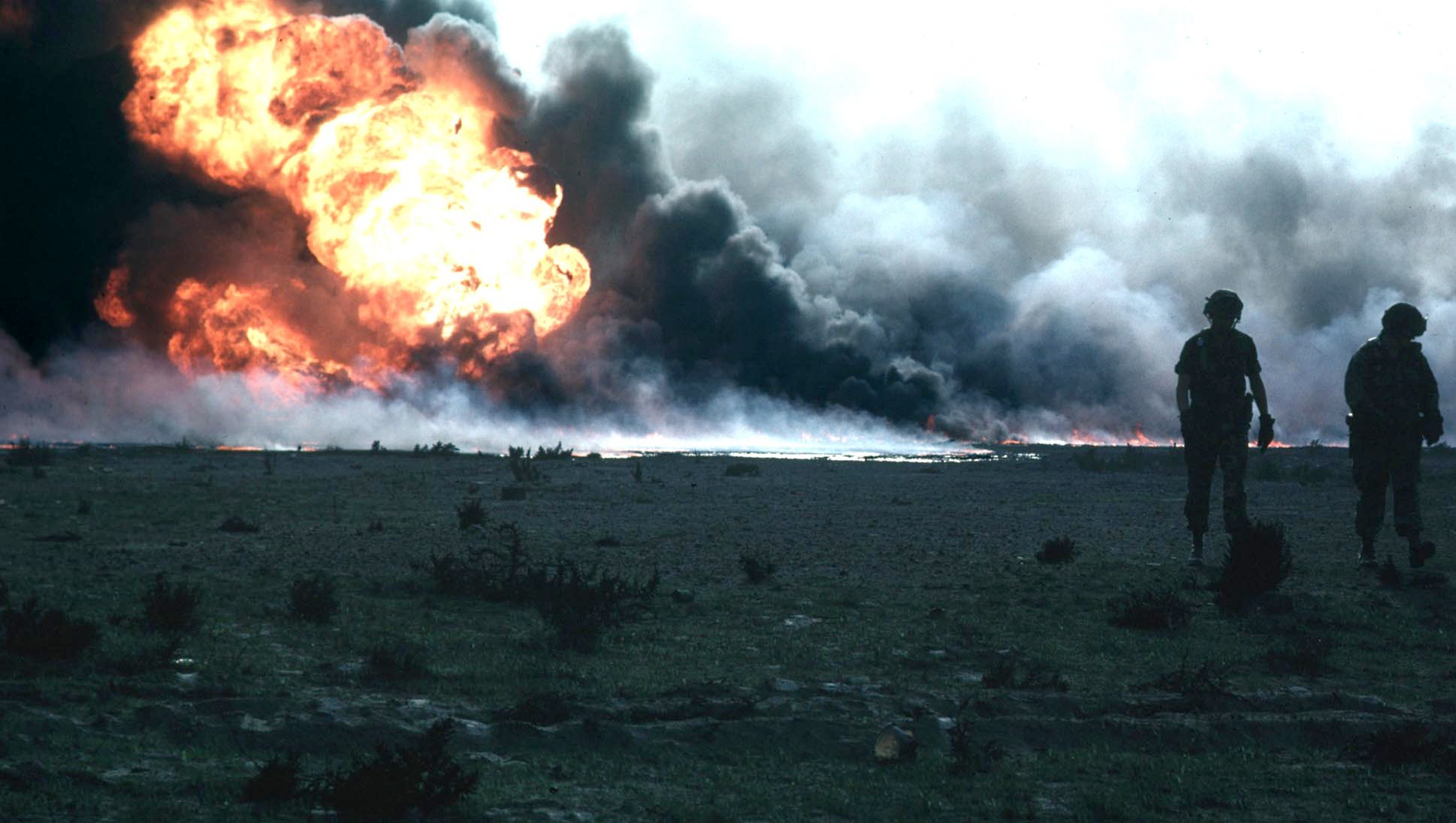
An oilfield on fire (1991)

Immediately following Iraq's invasion of Kuwait, predictions were made of an environmental disaster stemming from Iraqi threats to blow up captured Kuwaiti oil wells. Speculation ranging from a nuclear winter type scenario, to heavy acid rain and even short term immediate global warming were presented at the World Climate Conference in Geneva that November.

On January 10, 1991, a paper appearing in the journal Nature stated Paul Crutzen's calculations predicting that the oil well fires would produce a cloud of smoke covering half the Northern Hemisphere, resulting in widespread cooling similar to nuclear winter; temperatures beneath the cloud would be reduced by 5–10 degrees Celsius after 100 days. This was followed by articles printed in the Wilmington Morning Star and the Baltimore Sun newspapers in mid to late January 1991, with the popular television scientist personality of the time, Carl Sagan, who was also the co-author of the first few nuclear winter papers along with Richard P. Turco, John W. Birks, Alan Robock and Paul Crutzen together collectively stated that they expected catastrophic nuclear winter-like effects with continental sized impacts of "sub-freezing" temperatures as a result if the Iraqis went through with their threats of igniting 300 to 500 pressurized oil wells and they burned for a few months.

Later when Operation Desert Storm had begun, S. Fred Singer and Carl Sagan discussed the possible environmental impacts of the Kuwaiti petroleum fires on the ABC News program Nightline. Sagan again argued that some of the effects of the smoke could be similar to the effects of a nuclear winter, with smoke lofting into the stratosphere, a region of the atmosphere beginning around 43,000 feet (13,000 m) above sea level at Kuwait, resulting in global effects and that he believed the net effects would be very similar to the explosion of the Indonesian volcano Tambora in 1815, which resulted in the year 1816 being known as the Year Without a Summer. He reported on initial modeling estimates that forecast impacts extending to south Asia, and perhaps to the northern hemisphere as well.

Singer, on the other hand, said that calculations showed that the smoke would go to an altitude of about 3,000 feet (910 m) and then be rained out after about three to five days and thus the lifetime of the smoke would be limited. Both height estimates made by Singer and Sagan turned out to be wrong, albeit with Singer's narrative being closer to what transpired, with the comparatively minimal atmospheric effects remaining limited to the Persian Gulf region, with smoke plumes, in general, lofting to about 10,000 feet (3,000 m) and a few times as high as 20,000 feet (6,100 m).

Along with Singer's televised critique, Richard D. Small criticized the initial Nature paper in a reply on March 7, 1991, arguing along similar lines as Singer.

Sagan later conceded in his book The Demon-Haunted World that his prediction did not turn out to be correct: "it was pitch black at noon and temperatures dropped 4–6 °C over the Persian Gulf, but not much smoke reached stratospheric altitudes and Asia was spared."

At the peak of the fires, the smoke absorbed 75 to 80% of the sun's radiation. The particles rose to a maximum of 20,000 feet (6,100 m), but were scavenged by cloud condensation nuclei from the atmosphere relatively quickly.

Sagan and his colleagues expected that a "self-lofting" of the sooty smoke would occur when it absorbed the sun's heat radiation, with little to no scavenging occurring, whereby the black particles of soot would be heated by the sun and lifted/lofted higher and higher into the air, thereby injecting the soot into the stratosphere where it would take years for the sun blocking effect of this aerosol of soot to fall out of the air, and with that, catastrophic ground level cooling and agricultural impacts in Asia and possibly the Northern Hemisphere as a whole.

=== Actual consequences ===
In retrospect, it is now known that smoke from the Kuwait oil fires only affected the weather pattern throughout the Persian Gulf and surrounding region during the periods that the fires were burning in 1991, with lower atmospheric winds blowing the smoke along the eastern half of the Arabian Peninsula, and cities such as Dhahran and Riyadh, and countries such as Bahrain experienced days with smoke filled skies and carbon soot rainout/fallout.

Thus the immediate consequence of the arson sabotage was a dramatic regional decrease in air quality, causing respiratory problems for many Kuwaitis and those in neighboring countries.

According to the 1992 study from Peter Hobbs and Lawrence Radke, daily emissions of sulfur dioxide (which can generate acid rain) from the Kuwaiti oil fires were 57% of that from electric utilities in the United States, the emissions of carbon dioxide were 2% of global emissions and emissions of soot reached 3400 metric tons per day.

In a paper in the DTIC archive, published in 2000, it states that "Calculations based on smoke from Kuwaiti oil fires in May and June 1991 indicate that combustion efficiency was about 96% in producing carbon dioxide. While, with respect to the incomplete combustion fraction, Smoke particulate matter accounted for 2% of the fuel burned, of which 0.4% was soot." (With the remaining 2% being oil that did not undergo any initial combustion).

== Damage to coastline and soil ==
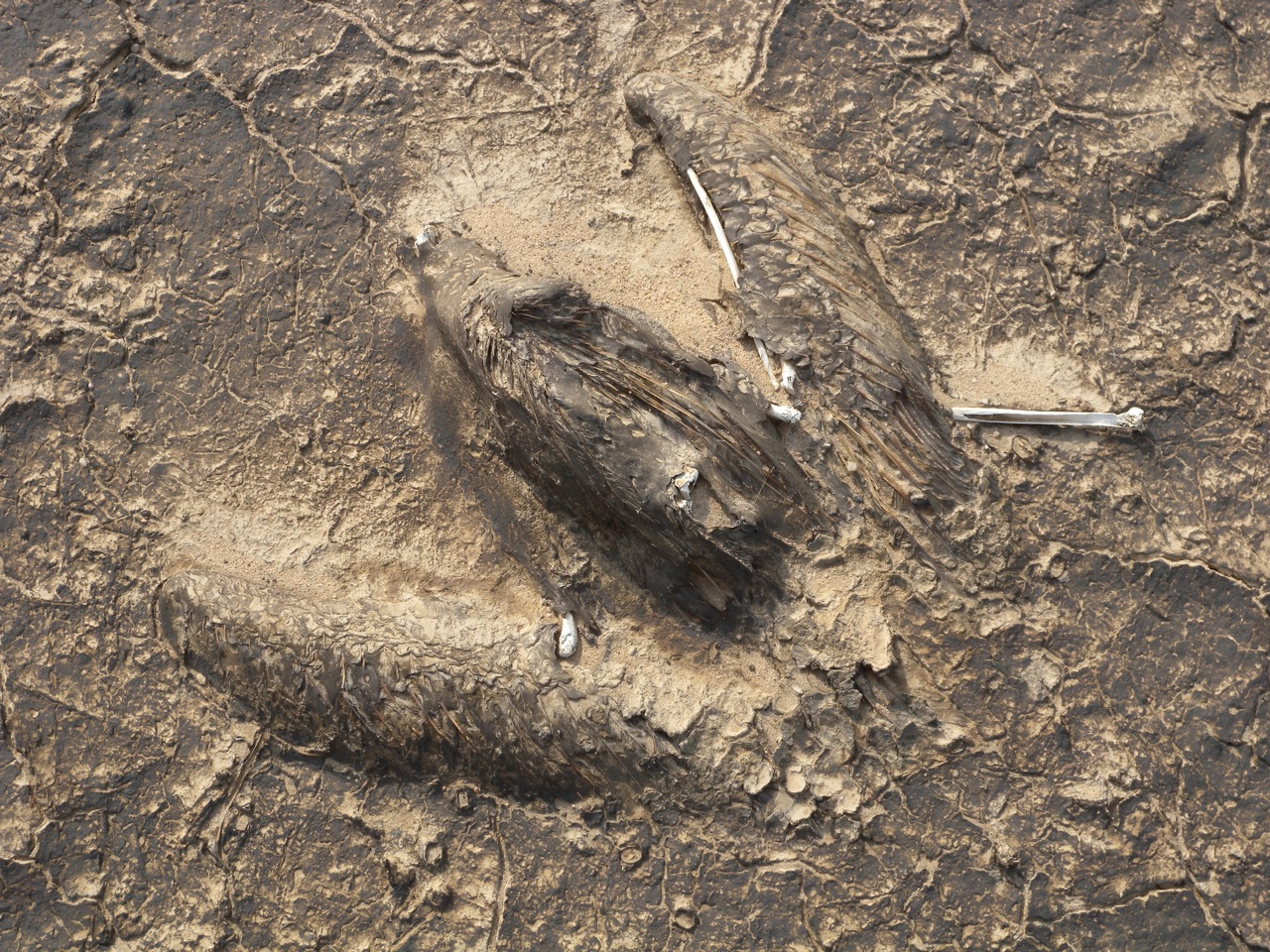
A 2008 picture of the mummified remains of a bird, encrusted within the top hard layer of a dry oil lake in the Kuwaiti desert.

Although scenarios that predicted long-lasting environmental impacts on a global atmospheric level due to the burning oil sources did not transpire, long-lasting ground level oil spill impacts were detrimental to the environment regionally.

Forty-six oil wells are estimated to have gushed, and before efforts to cap them began, they were releasing approximately 300,000–400,000 barrels of oil per day, with the last gusher being capped occurring in the latter days of October 1991.

The Kuwaiti Oil Minister estimated between twenty-five and fifty million barrels of unburned oil from damaged facilities pooled to create approximately 300 oil lakes, that contaminated around 40 million tons of sand and earth. The mixture of desert sand, unignited oil spilled and soot generated by the burning oil wells formed layers of hard "tarcrete", which covered nearly five percent of Kuwait's land mass.

Cleaning efforts were led by the Kuwait Institute for Scientific Research and the Arab Oil Co., who tested a number of technologies including the use of petroleum-degrading bacteria on the oil lakes.

Vegetation in most of the contaminated areas adjoining the oil lakes began recovering by 1995, but the dry climate has also partially solidified some of the lakes. Over time the oil has continued to sink into the sand, with potential consequences for Kuwait's small groundwater resources.

The land based Kuwaiti oil spill surpassed the Lakeview Gusher, which spilled nine million barrels in 1910, as the largest oil spill in recorded history.

Six to eight million barrels of oil were directly spilled into the Persian Gulf, which became known as the Gulf War oil spill.

== Documentaries ==
The fires were the subject of a 1992 documentary film, Fires of Kuwait, which was nominated for an Academy Award. The film includes footage of the Hungarian team using their jet turbine extinguisher.

Lessons of Darkness is a 1992 film by director Werner Herzog that explores the ravaged oil fields of post-Gulf War Kuwait.

Bechtel Corporation produced a short documentary titled Kuwait: Bringing Back the Sun that summarizes and focuses upon the fire fighting efforts, which were dubbed the Al-Awda (Arabic for "The Return") project.

Peter V. Hobbs also narrated a short amateur documentary titled Kuwait Oil Fires that followed the University of Washington's Cloud and Aerosol Research Group as they flew through, around, and above the smoke clouds and took samples, measurements, and videos of them in their Convair C-131.

== Comparable incidents ==
During the 2003 invasion of Iraq, approximately 40 oil wells were set on fire in the Persian Gulf within Iraq by Iraqi forces, ostensibly to hinder the invasion. The Kuwait Wild Well Killers, who successfully extinguished 41 of the Kuwait oil well fires in 1991, used their experience to tackle blazes in the Iraqi Rumaila oilfields in 2003.

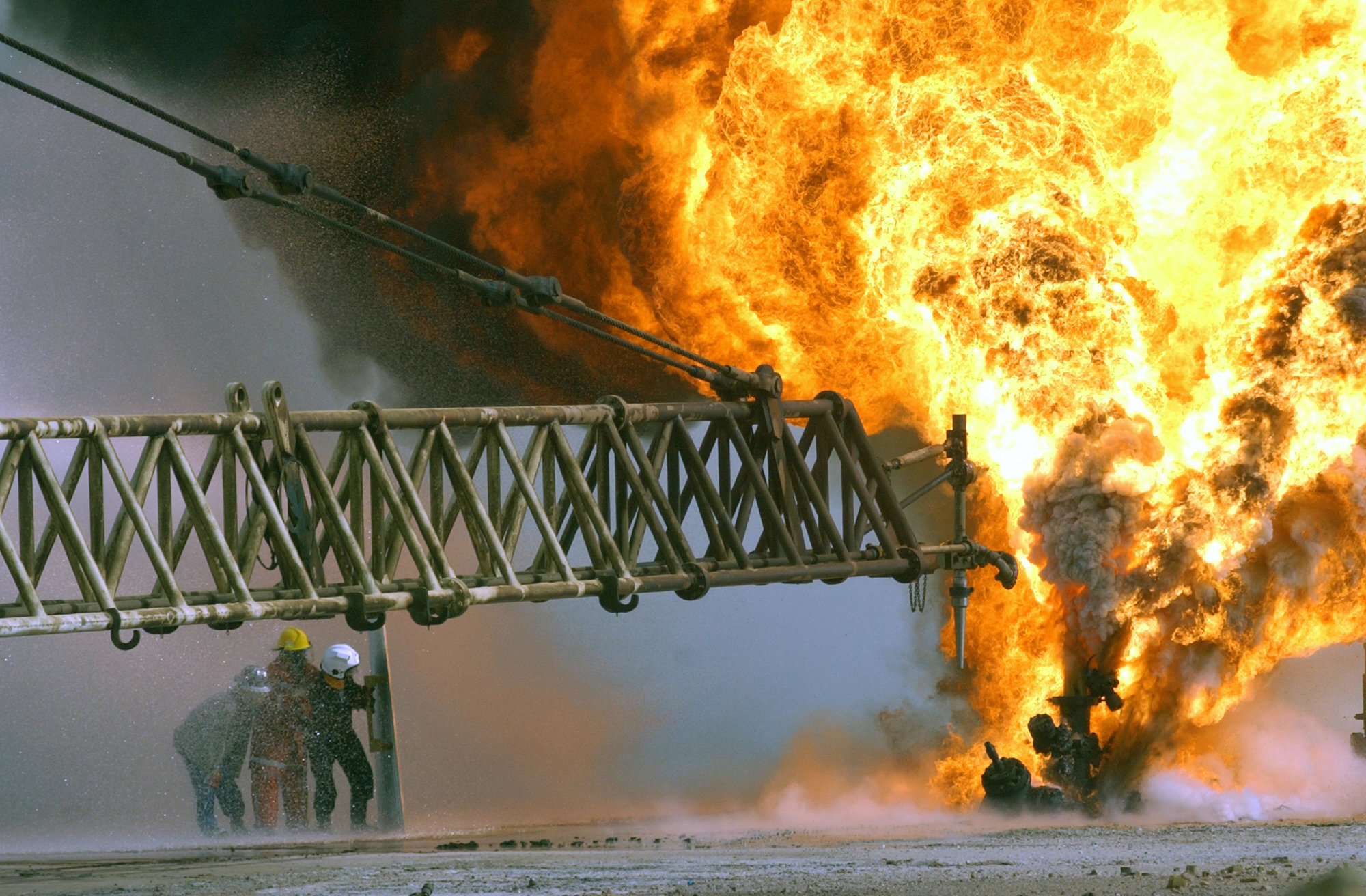
Firefighters fight to secure a burning oil well in the Iraqi Rumaila oilfields in 2003.

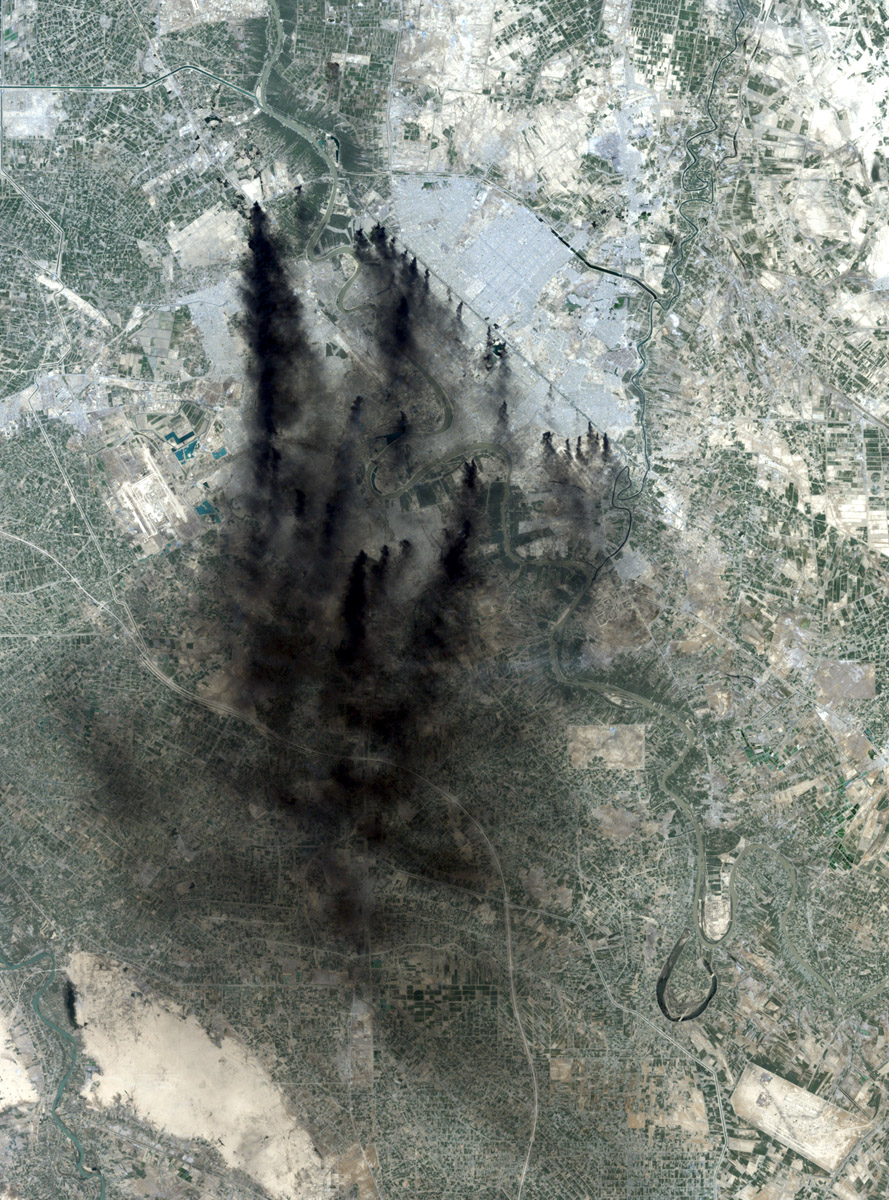
Landsat 7 CGI image of Baghdad, April 2, 2003. Fires set in an attempt to hinder attacking air forces.

== See also ==
- Devil's Cigarette Lighter – a gas well fire that consumed 16 million cubic meters of gas per day.
- Environmental impact of war
- Gulf War oil spill
- Nuclear winter#Kuwait wells in the first Gulf War
