= Children of Fire Initiative =

Kurdish arsonist group

The Children of Fire Initiative (Kurdish: Înîsiyatîfa Zarokên Agir; Turkish: Ateşin Çocukları İnisiyatifi), is a Kurdish arsonist group active in Turkey.

== History ==
Although they had committed arson many times before, the group was not widely recognized before 2020. The group committed 28 arson attacks in 2019. They burnt cars, boats, yachts, offices, and homes. They have no ideology or structure and are a plain "revenge" group. They also burnt military bases of Turkish troops stationed in northern Syria. The group claims that they are not Anti-Turkish, nor do they target ordinary Turkish civilians who mind their own business, and that their only targets are Turkish governmental buildings, and people they accuse of persecuting Kurds, such as AKP or MHP politicians, offices, and supporters.

The fires in Hatay in October 2020 were attributed to the group, and it was when they were recognised in the media. Turkish sources that it is a PKK proxy group, although it denies those claims and the PKK denied them too.
