= Gulf War oil spill =

1991 Iraqi action in the Persian Gulf

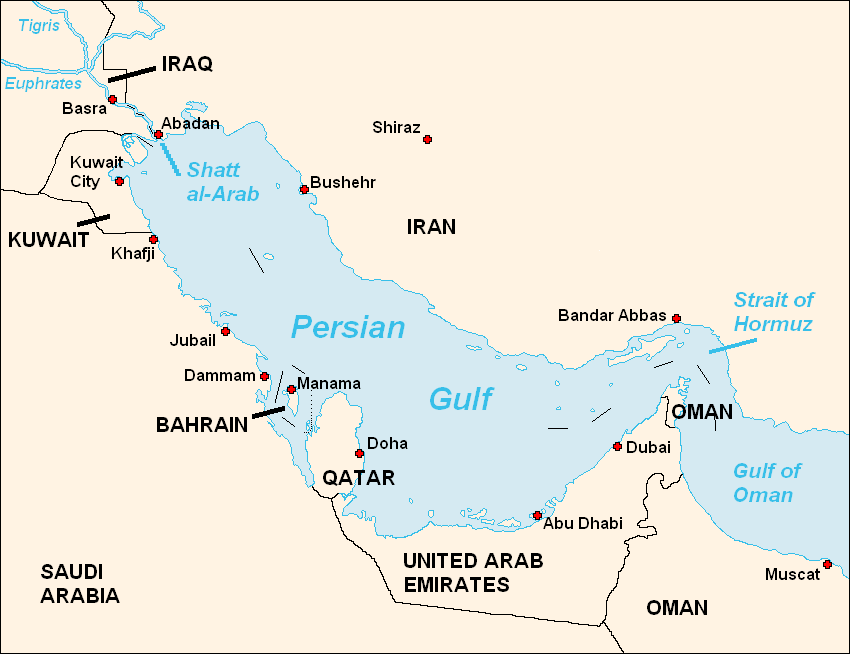
Map of the Persian Gulf and the countries around it

The Gulf War oil spill (or Persian Gulf oil spill) was the second largest oil spill in history, resulting from the Persian Gulf War in 1991. Iraqi forces allegedly began dumping oil into the Persian Gulf in January 1991 to stop a U.S. coalition-led water landing on their shores. Despite quite high initial estimates, the amount of oil spilled was likely about 4,000,000 US barrels (480,000 m^{3}). In the months following the spill, most clean-up was targeted at recovering oil, and very little clean-up was done on Saudi Arabia’s highly affected beaches. An initial study in 1993 found that the spill will not have long-term environmental consequences, but many studies since 1991 have concluded the opposite, claiming that the spill is responsible for environmental damage to coastline sediments and marine species and ecosystems. Considered an act of environmental terrorism, the spill was a heated political move that had implications for the larger Persian Gulf War and temporarily damaged Kuwait and Saudi Arabia.

== Background ==
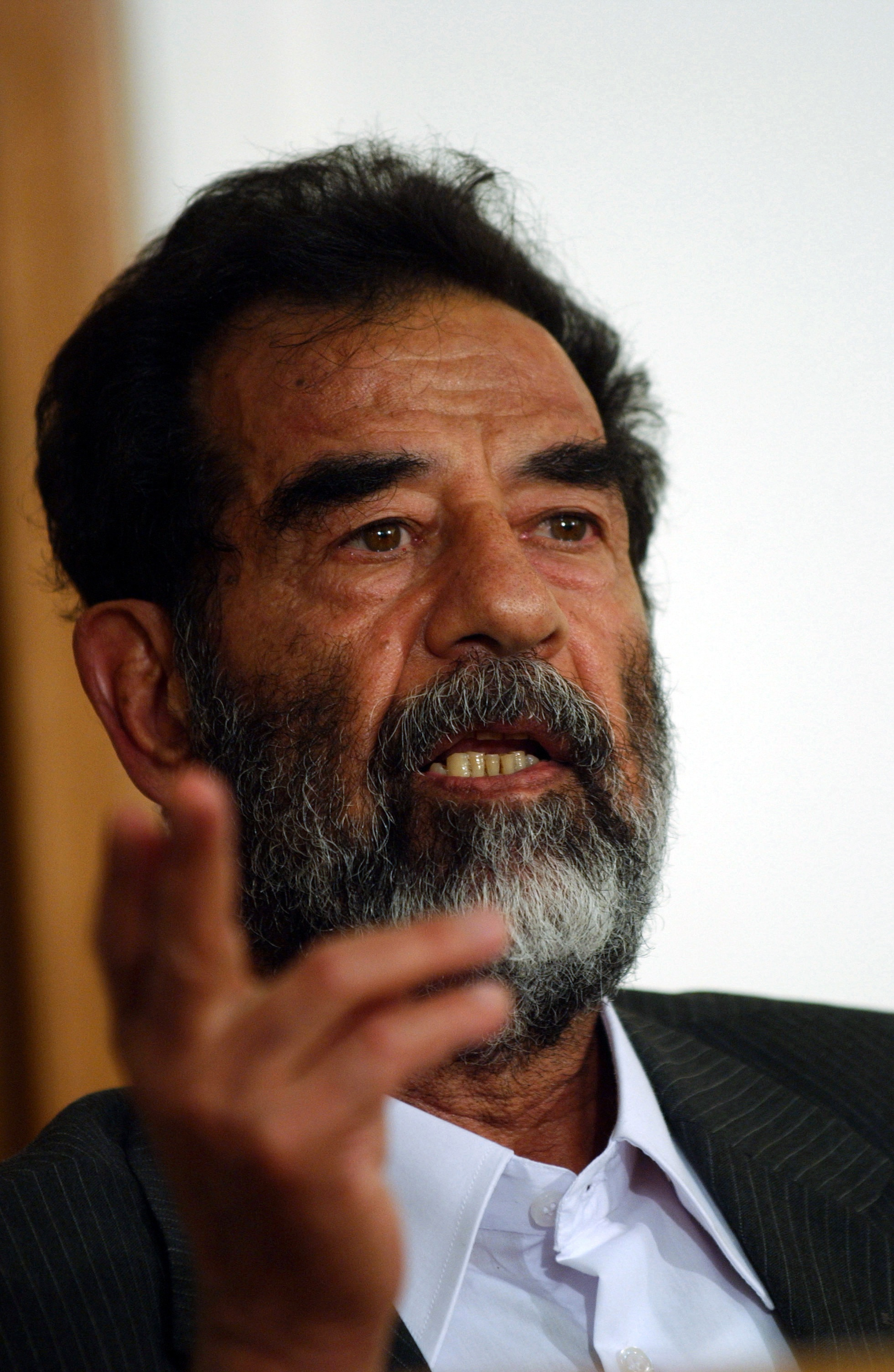
Saddam Hussein, shown here in 2004, was the leader of the Iraqi government at the time of the spill.

The Persian Gulf War oil spill came out of the Persian Gulf War that took place from 1990-1991. The war—fought between Iraq, under Saddam Hussein, and the Coalition forces—started with Iraq’s invasion and occupation of Kuwait on August 2, 1990. The invasion was a result of long-standing territorial and oil disputes. Several months into the war, Coalition forces led attacks on Iraqi military in Iraq and Kuwait on January 16, 1991. Nearly a week later, Iraqi forces countered these attacks by dumping oil into the Persian Gulf, ultimately resulting in the massive Persian Gulf War oil spill. According to Energy Secretary James D. Watkins, the US military had already prepared for such a move, as Saddam Hussein had previously threatened to dump oil into the Persian Gulf.

== The spill ==
At the end of January 1991, Iraq began to deliberately spill massive amounts of oil into the Persian Gulf, in an apparent attempt to foil a potential landing by US Marines on Kuwait's coast. It also made commandeering oil reserves dangerous for US and Coalition forces as visibility and movement were inhibited. Joyner and Kirkhope also posit that the spill could have been an attempt by Iraqi forces to cut off important water supplies for Coalition forces in Saudi Arabia. In a complaint to the United Nations, Iraq refuted allegations that they had intentionally caused the spill, claiming that American airstrikes had caused a discharge of oil from two Iraqi tankers.

Coalition forces determined the main source of oil to be the Sea Island Oil Terminal in Kuwait, which spilled approximately 70,000 to 80,000 tons of oil each day for a week. On January 27, four US F-111 fighter-bombers destroyed pipelines to prevent further spillage into the Persian Gulf. Several other sources of oil were found to be active: tankers and a damaged Kuwaiti oil refinery near Mina Al Ahmadi, tankers near Bubiyan Island, and Iraq's Mina Al Bakr terminal.

Early estimates from the Pentagon on the volume spilled hovered around 11,000,000 US barrels (1,300,000 m^{3}). These numbers were significantly adjusted downward by later, more-detailed studies; government researchers placed the volume of oil spilled between 4,000,000 US barrels (480,000 m^{3}) and 6,000,000 US barrels (720,000 m^{3}), while private researchers placed it between 2,000,000 US barrels (240,000 m^{3}) and 4,000,000 US barrels (480,000 m^{3}).

The slick reached a maximum size of 101 miles (160 km) by 42 miles (68 km) and was 5 inches (13 cm) thick in some areas. Despite the uncertainty surrounding the size of the spill, figures place it several times the size (by volume) of the Exxon Valdez oil spill, making it one of the—if not the—largest oil spills in history.

== Clean-up ==
After the spill’s occurrence, most clean-up efforts went into recovering the oil by skimming it from the water’s surface. By April 1991, it is estimated that hundreds of thousands of barrels of oil had already been recovered. However, the clean-up process was impeded by a lack of funding and equipment as well as by the ongoing Persian Gulf War. With these obstructions and most clean-up efforts being focused on oil recovery, very little clean-up was done on Saudi Arabia’s beaches. In a Wall Street Journal article written 14 months after the spill, Ken Wells reported that an estimated 375 miles (604 km) of shoreline remained covered in oil. The lack of attention given to Saudi Arabia’s beaches and other sensitive environments, such as mangrove forests and marshes, brought the Saudi government under attack by environmentalist groups concerned about the lasting effects of the oil.

== Environmental impact ==
From the first reports of the spill in January 1991, the possible environmental damage it could cause was at the forefront of many minds. Lippman and Booth, reporting for The Washington Post on January 26, 1991, cited multiple experts who had high concerns about the spill and its impacts on the environment, calling it an “ecological disaster.” Despite the industry that skirts the Persian Gulf, the area still supports a diverse ecosystem, including endangered and endemic species. Following the spill, researchers and environmentalists had serious concerns about the mortality of the Persian Gulf’s ecosystem. Research on the spill’s impacts on the environment began as soon as possible after the spill, with the National Oceanic and Atmospheric Administration (NOAA) already having preliminary results in April 1992, as reported by Ken Wells for The Wall Street Journal. Such research has continued through 2020.

In 1993, The New York Times reported that a study sponsored by UNESCO, Bahrain, Iran, Iraq, Kuwait, Oman, Qatar, Saudi Arabia, the United Arab Emirates and the United States found the spill did "little long-term damage" to the environment, with about half the oil evaporating, 1,000,000 US barrels (120,000 m^{3}) getting recovered, and 2,000,000 US barrels (240,000 m^{3}) to 3,000,000 US barrels (360,000 m^{3}) washing ashore, mainly in Saudi Arabia. Linden and Husain similarly estimated in 2002 that about 30-40% of the oil was removed by evaporation.

However, more recent scientific studies have tended to disagree with the 1993 assessment of the long-term ecological damage. US geochemist Dr. Jacqueline Michel asserted in 2010 that the oil spill had dramatic long-term effects on the environment, explaining that her research found that a large amount of the oil remained after 12 years due to its abnormally high ability to penetrate Gulf sediments. Linden and Husain found that in 2002, on average, oil penetrated about 10 cm, but in some circumstances, oil penetrated almost 50 cm, a depth that lengthens the natural degradation process significantly. In 2001, having studied Gulf sediments along with small crustaceans that live in the sediments known as ostracods, Mostafawi found that offshore sediments and the organisms in them were still affected by the 1991 spill. In 2017, Joydas et al. concluded that, while open water areas had low concentrations of hydrocarbons in the sediment, secluded bay areas had “alarming levels” that threatened the quality of life of organisms in such areas.

Researchers have focused on the health of the unique habitats of the Persian Gulf, including coral reefs, salt marshes, mud flats, and mangrove forests (Booth). Linden and Husain in 2002, as well as Issa and Vempatti in 2018, found that coral reefs were relatively unaffected by the oil spill. Some researchers found that marshlands and mud tidal flats continued to contain large quantities of oil, over nine years later, and full recovery is likely to take decades. In 2001, German geographer Dr. Hans-Jörg Barth found that salt marshes still suffered significantly from the spill while rocky shores and mangroves showed a full recovery. He attributes the delayed recovery of the salt marshes to the lack of wave action/physical energy and oxygen in the environment, important factors to the natural degradation of oil. Issa and Vempatti also found that mangrove forests had mostly recovered by 1995. Michel et al. found that salt marshes had a low recovery rate after the oil spill but found that mangrove forests had not recovered in 2003.

Linden and Husain in 2002, as well as Issa and Vempatti in 2018, reported that the oil had largely lost its toxicity by the time it reached shore; however, the oil coated vegetation and blocked light and air, damaging it. Both groups of researchers also found that the spill caused the death of many seabirds, including almost 30,000 grebes and cormorants, by coating the birds’ feathers. Linden and Husain found that marine turtles were relatively unaffected by the spill, except the Hawksbill sea turtle had a lower hatching rate that could have been caused by the 1991 spill. They also concluded that fish species in the northern Gulf were relatively unaffected by the spill.

== Political and economic impacts ==
In the first days of the spill, President George Bush was quoted as calling the spill strategy a “sick” act by Saddam Hussein. In January 1991, Andrew Rosenthal for The New York Times observed the US government’s eagerness to utilize the act to further demonize Saddam Hussein and to solidify Hussein as deeply immoral. A representative of the Pentagon Pete Williams described the spill as “environmental terrorism,” and Roger E. McManus of the Center for Marine Conservation stated Hussein “should be held accountable for his despicable crimes against the environment." The Persian Gulf War oil spill is considered “the world's first known act of large-scale eco-terrorism."

The Persian Gulf War oil spill caused significant economic damage to the fishing and oil industries around the Persian Gulf. Because of the war, and particularly because of the spill, fish and prawn fishing in the Gulf were halted in 1991. The spill also led to damage of fishing equipment and infrastructure. According to Issa and Vempatti, the spill caused a 1.5–2% loss of Kuwait’s oil reserves – a $12.3 billion to $38.4 billion loss.

== See also ==
- Kuwaiti oil fires
- Environmental impact of war
