= Volume and extent of the Deepwater Horizon oil spill =

The Deepwater Horizon oil spill was discovered on the afternoon of 22 April 2010 when a large oil slick began to spread at the former rig site. According to the Flow Rate Technical Group, the leak amounted to about 4.9 million barrels (210 million US gal; 780,000 m^{3}) of oil, exceeding the 1989 Exxon Valdez oil spill as the largest ever to originate in U.S.-controlled waters and the 1979 Ixtoc I oil spill as the largest spill in the Gulf of Mexico. BP has challenged this calculation saying that it is overestimated as it includes over 810,000 barrels (34 million US gal; 129,000 m^{3}) of oil which was collected before it could enter the Gulf waters.

== Spill flow rate ==
In its permit to drill the well, BP estimated the worst-case flow at 162 thousand barrels per day (25,800 m^{3}/d). Immediately after the explosion the USCG did not estimate any oil leaking from the sunken rig or from the well. On 24 April, USCG Rear Admiral Mary Landry announced that a damaged wellhead was indeed leaking. She stated that "the leak was a new discovery but could have begun when the offshore platform sank . . . two days after the initial explosion." Initial estimates by USCG and BP officials, based on remotely operated vehicles as well as the oil slick size, indicated the leak was as much as 1,000 barrels per day (160 m^{3}/d). Outside scientists quickly produced higher estimates, which presaged later increases in official numbers. Official estimates increased from 1,000 to 5,000 barrels per day (160 to 790 m^{3}/d) on 29 April, to 12 to 19 thousand barrels per day (1,900 to 3,000 m^{3}/d) on 27 May, to 25 to 30 thousand barrels per day (4,000 to 4,800 m^{3}/d) on 10 June, and to between 35 and 60 thousand barrels per day (5.6×10^{3} and 9.5×10^{3} m^{3}/d), on 15 June. Internal BP documents, released by Congress, estimated the flow could be as much as 100 thousand barrels per day (16×10^{3} m^{3}/d), if the blowout preventer and wellhead were removed and if restrictions were incorrectly modeled.

Progression of oil spill flow rate estimates
Source	Date	Barrels per day	Gallons per day	Cubic metres per day
BP estimate of hypothetical worst-case scenario (assumes no blowout preventer)	Permit	162,000	6,800,000	25,800
United States Coast Guard	23 April (after sinking)	0	0	0
BP and United States Coast Guard	24 April	1,000	42,000	160
Official estimates	29 April	1,000 to 5,000	42,000 to 210,000	790
Official estimates	27 May	12,000 to 19,000	500,000 to 800,000	1,900 to 3,000
Official estimates	10 June	25,000 to 30,000	1,100,000 to 1,300,000	4,000 to 4,800
Flow Rate Technical Group	19 June	35,000 to 60,000	1,500,000 to 2,500,000	5,600 to 9,500
Internal BP documents hypothetical worst case (assumes no blowout preventer)	20 June	up to 100,000	up to 4,200,000	up to 16,000
Official estimates	2 August	62,000	2,604,000	9,857

Official estimates were provided by the Flow Rate Technical Group—scientists from the National Oceanic Atmospheric Administration (NOAA), United States Geological Survey (USGS), Bureau of Ocean Energy Management, Regulation and Enforcement (BOEMRE), U.S. Department of Energy (DOE), and outside academics, led by USGS director Marcia McNutt. The later estimates were believed to be more accurate because it was no longer necessary to measure multiple leaks, and because detailed pressure measurements and high-resolution video had become available. According to BP, estimating the oil flow was very difficult as there was no underwater metering at the wellhead and because of the natural gas in the outflow. The company had initially refused to allow scientists to perform more accurate, independent measurements, saying that it was not relevant to the response and that such efforts might distract from efforts to stem the flow. Former EPA Administrator Carol Browner and Congressman Ed Markey (D-MA) both accused BP of having a vested financial interest in downplaying the size of the leak in part due to the fine they will have to pay based on the amount of leaked oil.

The final estimate reported that 53,000 barrels per day (8,400 m^{3}/d) were escaping from the well just before it was capped on 15 July. It is believed that the daily flow rate diminished over time, starting at about 62,000 barrels per day (9,900 m^{3}/d) and decreasing as the reservoir of hydrocarbons feeding the gusher was gradually depleted.

In a 3 December 2010, statement, BP claimed the government overestimated the size of the spill by between 20% and 50%. A document submitted by BP to the commission, NOAA, and The Justice Department says that "they rely on incomplete or inaccurate information, rest in large part on assumptions that have not been validated, and are subject to far greater uncertainties than have been acknowledged. Representative Markey, a member of the House energy panel that is investigating the spill, said in a statement that BP has done whatever it could to avoid revealing the true flow rate of the spill. "With billions of dollars at stake, it is no surprise that they are now litigating the very numbers which they sought to impede." A BP spokesperson said that BP "fully intends to present its own estimate as soon as the information is available to get the science right."

== Spill area and thickness ==
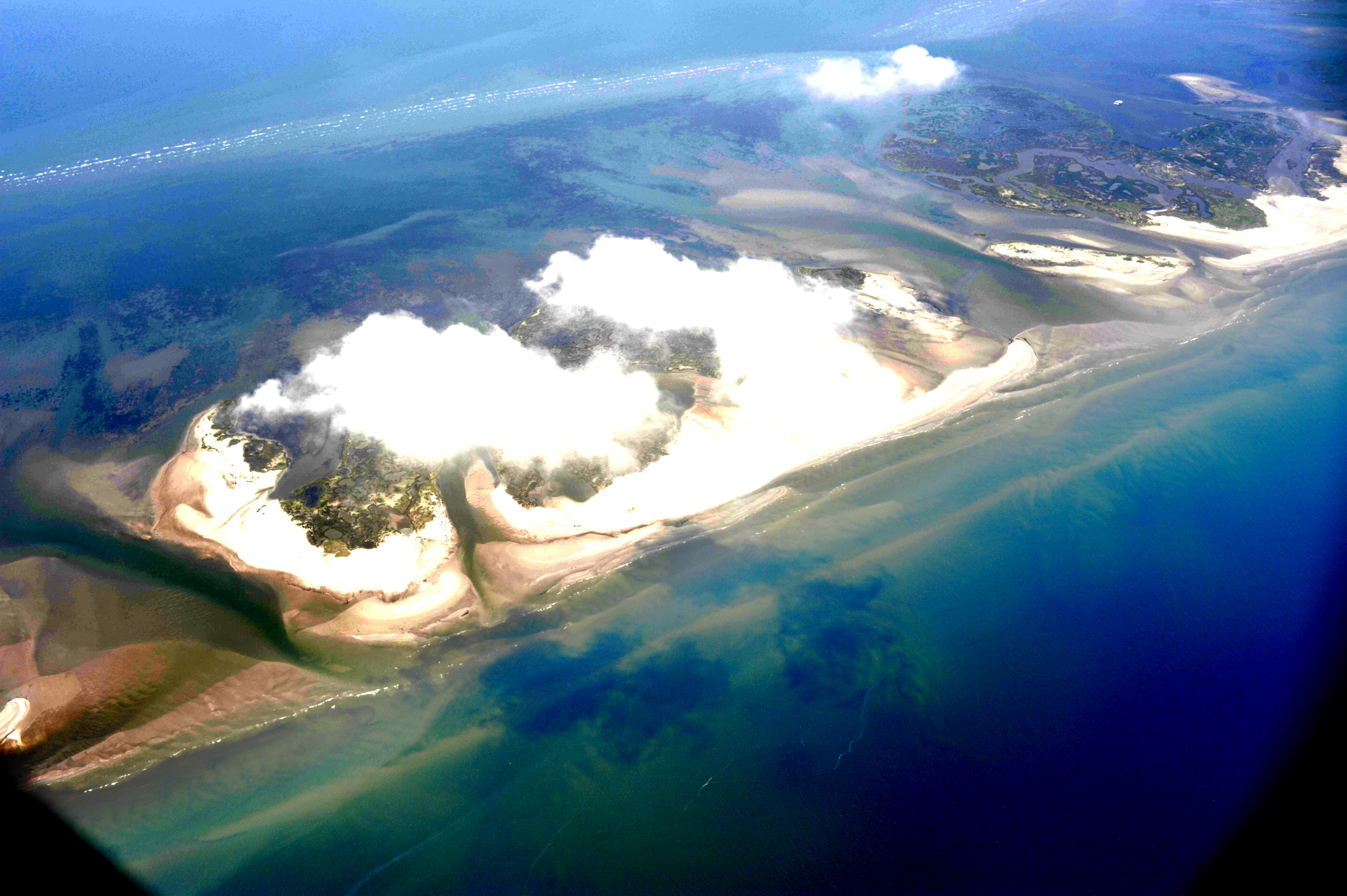
Oil slicks surround the Chandeleur Islands, Louisiana, in this aerial photo.

The oil's spread was initially increased by strong southerly winds caused by an impending cold front. By 25 April 2010, the spill covered 580 square miles (1,500 km^{2}) and was only 31 miles (50 km) from the ecologically sensitive Chandeleur Islands. A 30 April 2010 estimate placed the total spread of the oil at 3,850 square miles (10,000 km^{2}). The spill quickly approached the Delta National Wildlife Refuge and Breton National Wildlife Refuge. On 19 May 2010, both NOAA and other scientists monitoring the spill with the European Space Agency Envisat radar satellite stated that oil had reached the Loop Current, which flows clockwise around the Gulf of Mexico towards Florida and then joins the Gulf Stream along the U.S. east coast. On 29 June 2010, NOAA determined that the oil slick was no longer a threat to the loop current and stopped tracking offshore oil predictions that include the loop currents region. The omission is noted prominently on the ongoing nearshore surface oil forecasts that are posted daily on NOAA's website.

On 14 May 2010, the Automated Data Inquiry for Oil Spills model indicated that about 35% of a hypothetical 114,000-barrel (18,100 m^{3}) spill of light Louisiana crude oil released in conditions similar to those found in the Gulf would evaporate, that 50% to 60% of the oil would remain in or on the water, and the rest would be dispersed in the ocean. That means that over 100 million US gallons (2.4 Mbbl) of oil remained in the Gulf.

The wellhead was capped on 15 July 2010, and by 30 July, the surface oil appeared to have dissipated more rapidly than expected. Some scientists believe that the rapid dissipation of the surface oil may have been due to a combination of factors that included the natural capacity of the region to break down oil (petroleum normally leaks from the ocean floor by way of thousands of natural seeps and certain bacteria can consume it.); winds from storms appeared to have aided in rapidly dispersing the oil, and the cleanup response by BP and the government helped control surface slicks. As much as 40% of the oil may have simply evaporated at the ocean surface, and an unknown amount remains below the surface.

However, many scientists dispute the report's methodology and figures. Scientists said much oil was still underwater and could not be detected. According to the NOAA report released on 4 August 2010, about half of the oil leaked into the Gulf remains on or below the Gulf's surface. Some scientists are calling the NOAA estimates "ludicrous." According to USF chemical oceanographer David Hollander, while 25% of the oil can be accounted for by burning, skimming, etc., 75% is still unaccounted for. The federal calculations are based on direct measurements for only 430,000 barrels (68,000 m^{3}) of the oil spilled – the oil burned and skimmed. According to Bill Lehr, an author of the NOAA report, the other numbers are "educated scientific guesses," because "it is impossible to measure oil that is dispersed". FSU oceanography professor Ian MacDonald called it "a shaky report" and is unsatisfied with the thoroughness of the presentation and "sweeping assumptions" involved. John Kessler of Texas A&M, who led a National Science Foundation on-site study of the spill, said the report that 75% of the oil is gone is "just not true" and that 50% to 75% of the material that came out of the well remains in the water in a "dissolved or dispersed form". On 16 August 2010, UGA scientists said their analysis of federal estimates show that 80% of the oil the government said was gone from the Gulf of Mexico is still there. The Georgia team said "it is a misinterpretation of data to claim that oil that is dissolved is actually gone".

== Oil sightings ==
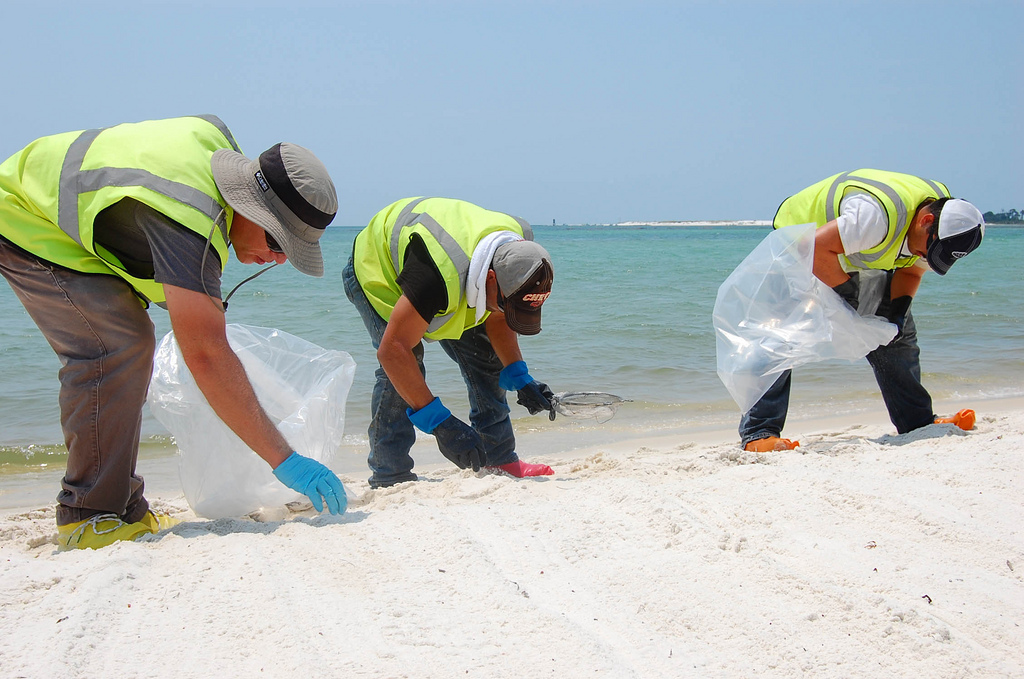
Workers picking up tar balls from the beach at Pensacola Naval Air Station, Florida.

Oil began washing up on the beaches of Gulf Islands National Seashore on 1 June 2010. By 4 June 2010, the spill had landed on 125 miles (201 km) of Louisiana's coast, had washed up along the Mississippi–Alabama barrier islands, and was found for the first time on a Florida barrier island at Pensacola Beach. On 9 June 2010, oil sludge began entering the Intracoastal Waterway through Perdido Pass after floating booms across the opening of the pass failed to stop the oil. On 23 June 2010, oil appeared on Pensacola Beach and in Gulf Islands National Seashore, and officials warned against swimming for 33 miles (53 km) east of the Alabama line. On 27 June 2010, tar balls and small areas of oil reached Gulf Park Estates, the first appearance of oil in Mississippi. Early in July 2010, tar balls reached Grand Isle, but 800 volunteers were cleaning them up. On 3 and 4 July 2010, tar balls and other isolated oil residue began washing ashore at beaches in Bolivar and Galveston, though it was believed a ship transported them there, and no further oil was found 5 July. On 5 July 2010, strings of oil were found in the Rigolets in Louisiana, and the next day tar balls reached the shore of Lake Pontchartrain. The amount of Louisiana shoreline affected by oil grew from 287 miles (462 km) in July to 320 miles (510 km) in late November 2010.

On 10 September 2010, it was reported that a new wave of oil suddenly coated 16 miles (26 km) of Louisiana coastline and marshes west of the Mississippi River in Plaquemines Parish. The Louisiana Department of Wildlife and Fisheries confirmed the sightings. On 23 October 2010, it was reported that miles-long stretches of weathered oil had been sighted in West Bay, Texas between Southwest Pass, the main shipping channel of the Mississippi River, and Tiger Pass near Venice, Louisiana. The sightings were confirmed by Matthew Hinton of The Times-Picayune.

At the end of October 2010, two research vessels studying the spill's effect on sea life found substantial amounts of oil on the seafloor. Kevin Yeager, a USM assistant professor of marine sciences found oil in samples dug up from the seafloor in a 140-mile (230 km) radius around the site of the Macondo well. The oil ranged from light degraded oil to thick raw crude. The sheer abundance of oil and its proximity to the well site, though, makes it "highly likely" that the oil is from the Macondo well. A second research team turned up traces of oil in sediment samples as well as evidence of chemical dispersants in blue crab larvae and long plumes of oxygen-depleted water emanating from the well site 50 miles (80 km) off Louisiana's coast.

In late November 2010, Plaquemine Parish, Louisiana coastal zone director P.J. Hahn reported that more than 32,000 US gallons (120 m^{3}) of oil had been sucked out of nearby marshes in the previous 10‑day period. In Barataria Bay, Louisiana, photos and firsthand accounts show oil still reaching high into the marshes, baby crabs and adult shrimp covered by crude and oil slicks on the surface of the water.

In January 2011, a spill commissioner reported that tar balls continue to wash up, oil sheen trails are seen in the wake of fishing boats, wetlands marsh grass remains fouled and dying, and crude oil lies offshore in deep water and in fine silts and sands onshore. On 26 May 2011, the Louisiana Department of Environmental Quality extended the state of emergency related to the spill. In April 2012, oil was found dotting 200 miles (320 km) of Louisiana's coast. As of December 2012, 339 miles (546 km) of coastline remain subject to evaluation and/or cleanup operations.

== Underwater oil plumes ==
On 15 May 2010, researchers from the National Institute for Undersea Science and Technology, aboard the research vessel RV Pelican, identified oil plumes in the deep waters of the Gulf of Mexico, including one as large as 10 miles (16 km) long, 3 miles (4.8 km) wide and 300 feet (91 m) thick in spots. The shallowest oil plume the group detected was at about 2,300 feet (700 m), while the deepest was near the seafloor at about 4,593 feet (1,400 m)4,593. Other researchers from the UGA found that the oil may have occupied multiple layers.

By 27 May 2010, marine scientists from the USF had discovered a second oil plume, stretching 22 miles (35 km) from the leaking wellhead toward Mobile Bay, Alabama. The oil had dissolved into the water and was no longer visible. Undersea plumes may have been the result of the use of wellhead chemical dispersants. NOAA conducted an independent analysis of the water samples provided from the 22–28 May 2010, research mission of the USF's Weatherbird II vessel. The samples from all undersea plumes were in very low concentrations, less than 0.5 parts per million. NOAA indicated that one of the plumes was unrelated to the BP wellhead leak, while the other plume samples were in concentrations too low or too highly fractionated to determine their origin. In a report released on 8 June 2010, NOAA stated that one plume was consistent with the oil from the leak, one was not consistent, and that they were unable to determine the origin of two samples.

On 23 June 2010, NOAA released a report which confirmed deepwater oil plumes in the Gulf and that they did originate from BP's well, stating, "The preponderance of evidence based on careful examination of the results from these four different cruises leads us to conclude that DWH-MC252 oil exists in subsurface waters near the well site in addition to the oil observed at the sea surface and that this oil appears to be chemically dispersed. While no chemical "fingerprinting" of samples was conducted to conclusively determine origin, the proximity to the well site and the following analysis support this conclusion". Reporting on a study that ended on 28 June 2010, scientists published conclusive evidence of a deep plume 22 miles (35 km) long linked directly to the Deepwater Horizon well. They reported that it did not appear to be degrading quickly and that it may pose a long-lasting threat for marine life deep in the ocean. On 23 July 2010, USF researchers and NOAA released two separate studies confirming subsea plumes of oil resulting from the Deepwater Horizon well.

Researchers from NOAA and Princeton University concluded that the deep plumes of dissolved oil and gas would likely remain confined to the northern Gulf of Mexico and that the peak impact on dissolved oxygen would be delayed (several months) and long lasting (years). David Valentine of UCSB believes that the oil plumes had been diluted in the ocean faster than they had biodegraded, suggesting that the LBNL researchers had overestimated the rate of biodegradation. In October 2010, scientists reported a continuous plume of over 22 miles (35 km) in length at a depth of about 3,600 ft (1,100 m). That plume persisted for several months without substantial degradation.

NOAA's research vessels later found evidence of the multiple undersea plumes, and NOAA chief Jane Lubchenco subsequently warned that these plumes might be the source of some of the 'most significant impacts' due to the effect on juvenile Bluefin Tuna and other fish.

When scientists initially reported the discovery of undersea oil plumes, BP stated its sampling showed no evidence that oil was massing and spreading in the gulf water column. Lubchenco urged caution, calling the reports "misleading, premature and, in some cases, inaccurate." Scientists from the USF and the USM said that when they brought the evidence of deep sea plumes to NOAA and the USCG, the government tried to suppress their findings. According to Vernon Asper, oceanographer at USG, "We expected that NOAA would be pleased because we found something very, very interesting ... NOAA instead responded by trying to discredit us".

== Oil on seafloor ==
On 10 September 2010, Samantha Joye, a professor in the Department of Marine Sciences at the University of Georgia on a research vessel in the Gulf of Mexico announced her team's findings of a substantial layer of oily sediment stretching for dozens of miles in all directions suggesting that a lot of oil did not evaporate or dissipate but may have settled to the seafloor. She describes seeing layers of oily material covering the bottom of the seafloor, in some places more than 2 inches (51 mm) thick on top of normal sediments containing dead shrimp and other organisms. She speculates that the source may be organisms that have broken down the spilled oil and excreted an oily mucus that sinks, taking with it oil droplets that stick to the mucous. "We have to [chemically] fingerprint the oil and link it to the Deepwater Horizon," she says. "But the sheer coverage here is leading us all to come to the conclusion that it has to be sedimented oil from the spill, because it's all over the place."

By January 2011, USF researchers found layers of oil near the wellhead that were "up to 5 times thicker" than recorded by the team in August 2010. USF's David Hollander remarked, "Oil's presence on the ocean floor didn't diminish with time; it grew" and he pointed out, "the layer is distributed very widely," radiating far from the wellhead.

In 2013, some scientists at the Gulf of Mexico Oil Spill and Ecosystem Science Conference said that as much as one-third of the oil may have been mixed with deep ocean sediments and dragged to the bottom of the ocean floor where it remains, risking damage to ecosystems and commercial fisheries.

== Recurrent or continued leakage ==
Oil at or near the site of the spill following well closure has suggested to some that there is continued or recurrent leakage. NBC Nightly News reported the slick on March 22, 2011. In August 2011, oil and oil sheen covering several square miles of water were again reported surfacing not far from BP's Macondo well. Scientific analysis confirmed that the oil is a chemical match for Macondo 252. The USCG said the oil was too dispersed to recover and posed no threat to the coastline.

In March 2012, "persistent oil seep" near the Macondo well was again reported. More sightings in October 2012 prompted another investigation into the source of the continued oil seepage. The USCG again found the oil was a chemical match for Macondo, and sent a Notice of Federal Interest to BP and Transocean which warned they may be held financially responsible for clean-up related to the new oil. Congressman Ed Markey called on BP to come up with a plan to "remove all remaining oil from the dome and any other wreckage". He repeated his request for the release of underwater ROV footage taken during the sheen investigation, which the USCG had promised but failed to provide.

The USCG suggested the sheen "could be residual oil associated with wreckage and/or debris left on the seabed" like the riser pipe, but said that no one yet knows its origin for sure. Marcia McNutt, director of the U.S. Geological Survey, calculated that if the riser pipe was full of oil, it could hold at most 1,000 barrels (160 m^{3}) because it's open on both ends. She said it's unlikely to hold the amount of oil being observed.

Commenting on the ongoing leakage, oceanographer Ian MacDonald said, "it's possible that the wreckage in 2010 somehow opened up a new fault on the seafloor". In May 2010, BP admitted they had "discovered things that were broken in the sub-surface" during the 'top kill' effort. Environmental groups share MacDonald's concern, fearing that the drilling of relief wells or the original well failure may have fractured the sea floor, allowing oil to escape.

In January 2013, the sheen grew to more than seven-miles long and one-mile wide according to aerial observations made by former NASA physicist Bonnie Schumaker, who observed "patches of rainbow and weathered mousse" in the sheen. Samples of the sheen on several occasions "have consistently found the presence of alpha olefiens, which is a chemical bond signature of a man-made chemical you would not find in pure crude form."

== Independent monitoring ==
Wildlife and environmental groups accused the White House and BP of holding back information about the extent and impact of the growing slick, and urged the White House to order a more direct federal government role in the spill response. Greenpeace Executive Director Phil Radford used a preliminary report from the National Commission on the BP Deepwater Horizon Oil Spill and Offshore Drilling to claim that the White House had blocked efforts by federal scientists to publicly reveal how high the oil spill rate was. However, the preliminary report's findings were strongly disputed by the White House, which issued statements that disproved several of the report's most controversial claims as inaccurate. In prepared testimony for a congressional committee, National Wildlife Federation President Larry Schweiger claimed that BP had failed to disclose results from its tests of chemical dispersants used on the spill, and that BP had tried to withhold video showing the true magnitude of the leak. On 19 May 2010, BP established a live feed, popularly known as spillcam, of the spill after hearings in Congress accused the company of withholding data from the ocean floor and blocking efforts by independent scientists to come up with estimates for the amount of crude flowing into the Gulf each day. On 20 May 2010, United States Secretary of the Interior Ken Salazar indicated that the U.S. government would verify how much oil had leaked into the Gulf of Mexico. United States Environmental Protection Agency (EPA) Administrator Lisa Jackson and United States Secretary of Homeland Security Janet Napolitano asked for the results of tests looking for traces of oil and dispersant chemicals in the waters of the gulf.

Journalists attempting to document the impact of the spill were repeatedly refused access to public areas, and photojournalists were prevented from flying over areas of the gulf to document the scope of the disaster. Meanwhile, Phil Radford documented BP's methods of escaping liability and keeping people hired to clean the oil spill out of areas affected by the oil spill. These accusations were leveled at BP, its contractors, local law enforcement, USCG, and other government officials. Scientists also complained about prevention of access to information controlled by BP and government sources. BP stated that its policy was to allow the media and other parties as much access as possible. On 30 June 2010, the USCG put new restrictions in place across the Gulf Coast that prevented vessels from coming within 20 meters (66 ft) "of booming operations, boom, or oil spill response operations". In a press briefing, USCG admiral Thad Allen said the new regulation was related to safety issues. On CNN's 360, host Anderson Cooper rejected the motivation for the restrictions outright. The Civil Air Patrol also monitored the spill on behalf of the USCG. 27 May 2010
