= Samantha Joye =

American oceanographer

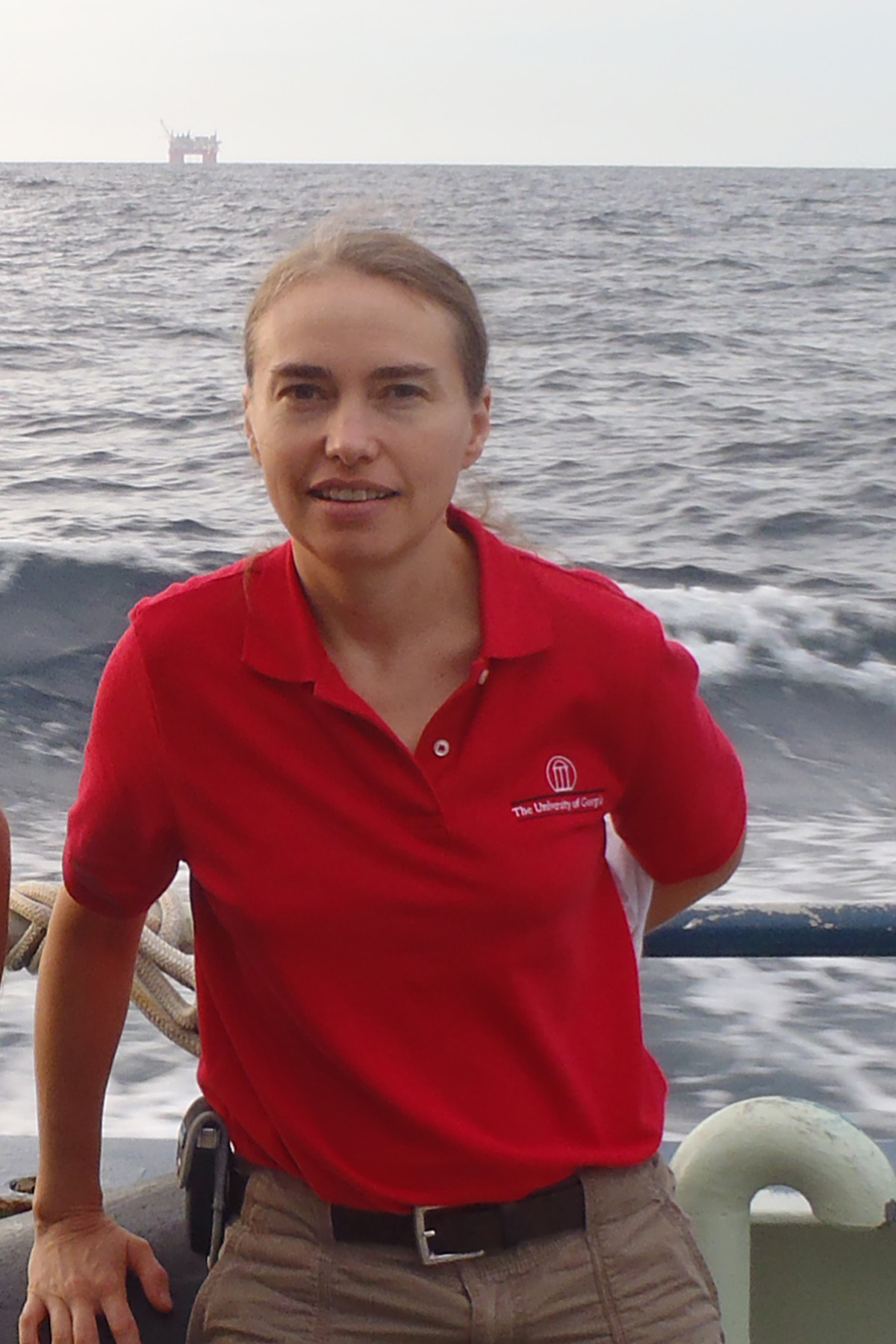
- Born: Samantha Benton Joye; August 16, 1965 (age 61); Laurinburg, North Carolina, U.S.
- Other name: Mandy Joye
- Education: The University of North Carolina
- Spouse: Christof Meile
- Children: 3
- Awards: Fellow of the AAAS, AGU, ASM/AAM and Sustaining Fellow of ASLO. She was elected to the National Academy of Engineering in February 2026.
- Scientific career
- Fields: Geobiology, Microbiology, Biogeochemistry, Biological Oceanography, Chemical Oceanography, Omics
- Workplaces: University of Georgia
- Website: joyelab.org

Samantha "Mandy" Joye is an American oceanographer who is well known for her work studying the Deepwater Horizon Oil Spill. She is a professor (Athletic Association Professor in Arts and Sciences) at the University of Georgia in the Department of Marine Sciences. Joye has made fundamental contributions in ocean biogeochemistry and microbial ecology, and is also regularly called upon by scientific and policy agencies as well as the media for expert commentary on ocean ecology. She was the expedition scientist and a lead science advisor for The Deep episode, part of the BBC's Blue Planet II, and is featured in production videos including Brine Pools: Exploring an Alien World for Blue Planet II and Future of the Oceans. She led the “Ecosystem Impacts of Oil and Gas in the Gulf” research consortium between 2014 and 2020 and conducts research to understand relationships between biogeochemical cycles (e.g. of hydrocarbons), microbial activity, and environmental factors in many diverse ocean environments.

== Early life and education ==
Joye was born in Laurinburg, North Carolina. She grew up in a small town along the North/South Carolina border. She worked on her father's crop farm, and in the summer, would often visit Myrtle Beach. She graduated as valedictorian of her class at Marlboro Academy in 1983. In an interview with Nature Research Microbiology, she said that her love for the ocean was sparked at a young age during the weeks she spent each summer exploring the South Carolina coast with her family. After receiving a microscope for a birthday present when she was 9, she became interested in microbiology. She enrolled at University of North Carolina at Chapel Hill as a pre-med / biology major, with aspirations of being a heart surgeon. While at university, she joined Kappa Alpha Theta. In her junior year, she took an elective course in marine science, and switched majors to oceanography. She graduated with a Bachelor of Science in 1987, a Master of Science in 1989, and a Ph.D. in Marine Sciences in 1993.

== Post-graduate and academic career ==
Known as “Mandy” to her friends and colleagues, Joye joined the faculty at the University of Georgia in 1997 after a short stint at Texas A&M University, where she was an assistant professor in oceanography from 1995 to 1997. Prior to serving as an assistant professor at Texas A&M, she was a post doc at the Romberg Center for Environmental Studies, San Francisco State University, in Tiburon, CA (1993–1995). Joye has authored 165 papers in peer-reviewed journals, and 16 peer-reviewed book chapters on topics including nearshore carbon and nitrogen cycling and geobiology of deep sea extreme environments. She has made fundamental contributions to our understanding of biogeochemistry and microbial ecology in marine environments, with a number of transformative advancements that led to high-profile publications. Her work has revealed unexpected connectivity between elemental cycles, unanticipated feedbacks between geological, elemental and microbial dynamics, and fundamental controls on microbial populations and their activity.

== Deepwater Horizon Oil Spill ==
On April 20, 2010, the Deepwater Horizon drilling platform suffered a loss of well control that resulted in a large explosion and fire, killing eleven men. Two days later, on April 22, 2010, the drilling platform sank, severing the riser pipe at the seabed and initiating an uncontrolled discharge of oil and gas from the broken wellhead. Joye began studying methane and hydrocarbon dynamics in the Gulf of Mexico in 1994, putting her in a strong position to contribute to the scientific response efforts during the 2010 Deepwater Horizon explosion. Joye was a member of the shore-based scientist team in the first academic expedition in response to the oil spill on board the R/V Pelican (May 5, 2010) that was led by Arne Diercks and Vernon Asper. She was the chief scientist on the second academic research expedition on board the F.G. Walton Smith, which sailed in late May 2010.

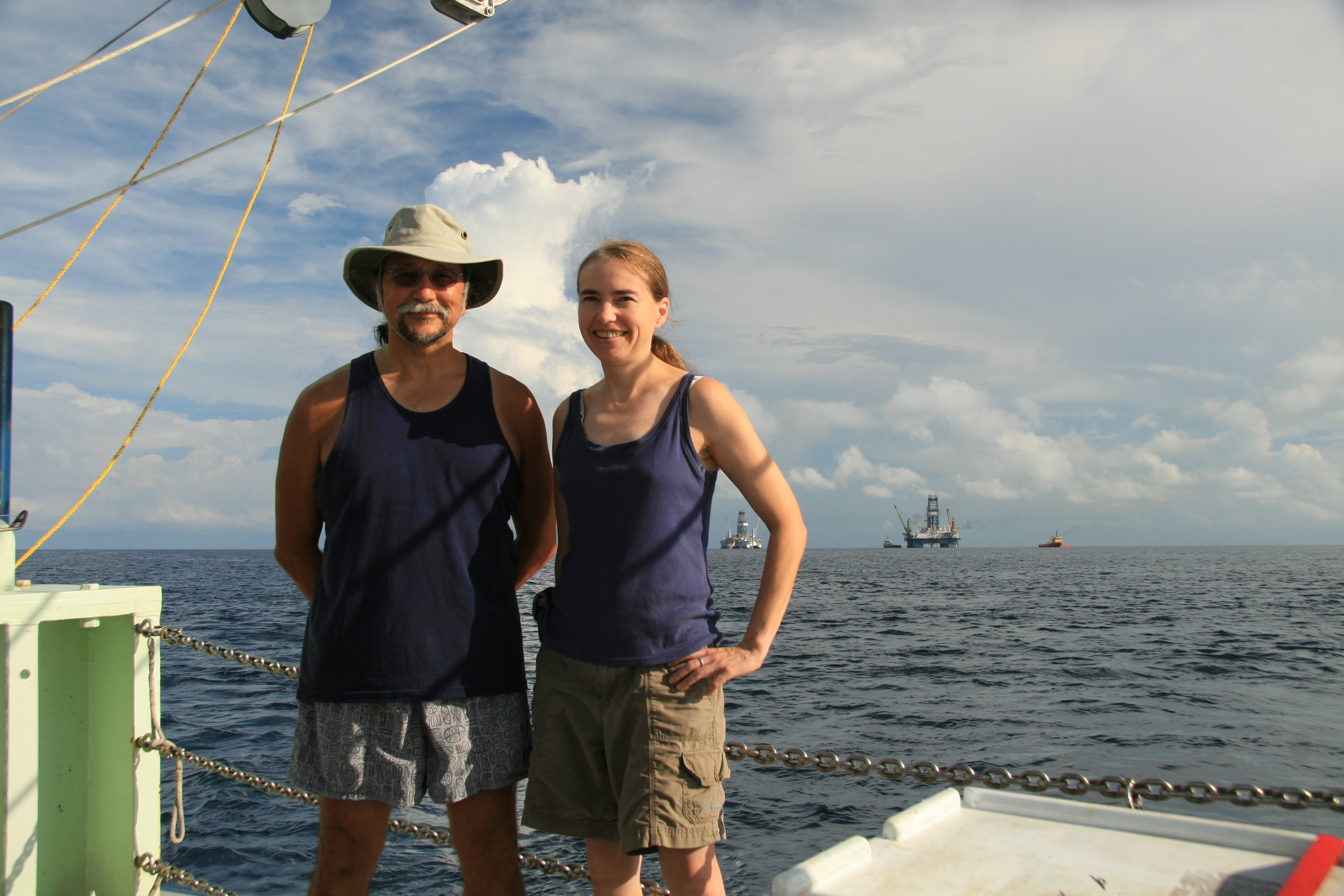
Dr. Samantha Joye and Dr. Joe Montoya (Georgia Tech) on a research expedition in the Gulf of Mexico in 2010.

Work conducted on the R/V Pelican expedition led to the discovery of deepwater oil plumes, hydrocarbon rich layers in the water column that were neutrally buoyant above the seafloor but well below the surface (at about 1050 m below the surface; about 450 m above the bottom). This finding was very controversial and was received initially with a great deal of skepticism. During the F.G. Walton Smith expedition, National Public Radio ran a story about the deepwater plumes that garnered more national attention. After the expedition, Joye testified before Congress in a hearing before the House Energy and Environment Committee to share evidence that the deepwater plumes did, in fact, exist. Shortly thereafter, the finding was confirmed by NOAA, leading to an effort to quantify the fate of the hydrocarbons hidden deep beneath the water's surface as part of the Natural Resources Damage Assessment.

Several months later, in mid-August 2010, Joye embarked on another mission to attempt to explore the fate of discharged oil and gas. On that expedition, Joye reported another controversial finding: the discovery of recently deposited oil-rich layers on the seabed, suggesting that some of the Deepwater Horizon oil may have been removed via sedimentation and was on the seabed. She returned to the area in late November 2010 with the research submersible ALVIN to dive to the seafloor and obtain a firsthand view of the situation. While this finding was also greeted initially with some degree of skepticism, it was ultimately proven correct. The discovery of oil sedimentation as a fate for discharged oil was immensely important. This event had a very negative effect on benthic fauna, including infauna and long-lived cold water coral, meaning that oil sedimentation represents a long-term impact on the benthic ecosystem.

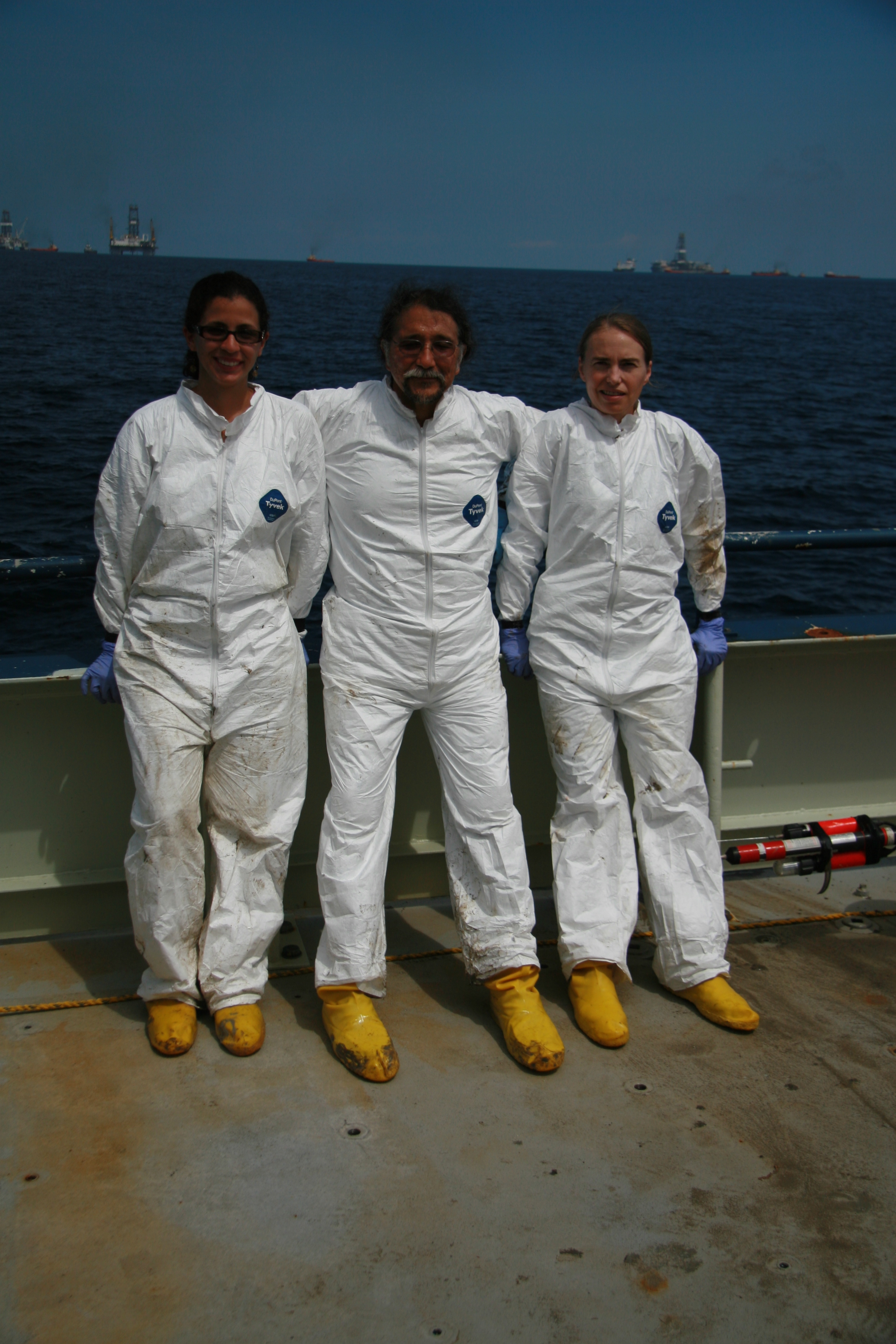
Dr Samantha Joye, Dr. Joe Montoya (Georgia Tech) and Dr. Melitza Crespo-Medina in the Gulf of Mexico, 2010. They are wearing tyvek suits to protect them from the hazardous conditions of working with the oil that was spilled during the Deepwater Horizon accident.

Joye's role in the Deepwater Horizon offshore scientific response transitioned into a leading role in the post spill assessment. She was the associate director of science of the first “Ecosystem Impacts of Oil and Gas in the Gulf” (ECOGIG) research consortium and the project director for the second program, “Ecosystem Impacts of Oil and Gas in the Gulf-2”. She continues to lead ECOGIG and her research is still tracking the impacts and fate of hydrocarbons derived from the Deepwater Horizon incident. She is also conducting studies of natural hydrocarbon seeps in the Gulf and elsewhere to foster advances in understanding how microbial populations process hydrocarbons.

== Press coverage of her work ==
Joye's research on the 2010 Deepwater Horizon oil spill received extensive media coverage and she continues to be a source for the media regarding the microbiological processing of hydrocarbons in the environment, the dynamics of extreme environments, and general oceanography. She has been interviewed, quoted, or featured in numerous news stories about her research in the Gulf of Mexico, including interviews by The New York Times, The Wall Street Journal, Discover, Science and Nature.

Joye's media appearances helped educate the media and general public about unique features of the Deepwater Horizon, including the deepwater plumes, marine oil snow and oil sedimentation, and the application of chemical dispersants, as well as highlighting the valuable ecosystem services provided by the Gulf's deepwater ecosystems. The Deepwater Horizon oil spill was an enormous environmental perturbation but it was also an opportunity to teach the public about the Gulf Ecosystem and the ocean in general.

Joye's oil spill research was the topic of two UGA-produced documentaries (Black and Blue: Beneath the Gulf Oil Disaster and Atlantis Revealed: Where the Oil Went). Black and Blue won a regional Emmy award. Her work was highlighted in the fall 2010 issue of the Georgia Magazine and the winter 2015 issue of the Georgia Magazine. Joye was featured in oil spill documentaries produced by National Geographic, Animal Planet, the CBC, and the BBC and was a major character in a book on the oil spill (Black Tide, authored by Antonia Juhasz and published in April 2011).

As of June 2024, Joye's efforts in researching the Gulf of California's hydrothermal vents with her team resulted in The Explorers Club featuring them in their Ocean Week conference for their discoveries in relation to the alterations of the vents. A BBC documentary will also feature video from their research.

== Advocacy ==
External videos
- “The Deep", Blue Planet II
- “Future of the Oceans", BBC Earth
- “Brine Pools", OceanX Media
- “Searching for Cures in the Deep Sea", OceanX Media

Joye has been involved in ocean education and outreach and advocacy work, but her advocacy efforts increased significantly after she became engaged as a scientific responder during the Deepwater Horizon oil spill. Locally and regionally, through the ECOGIG program, Joye initiated the “Science at the Stadium” program, which evolved into the “Ocean Discovery Zone”. The “Ocean Discovery Zone” portable platform has helped educate students and the general public in Georgia and up and down the East coast about the Gulf of Mexico ecosystem and ocean science in general

Nationally and internationally, Joye has held educational events to celebrate World Oceans Day and frequently speaks at EarthX (formerly Earth Day Texas). In 2015, she began working with BBC Earth and OceanX Media, formerly Alucia Productions, on the deep ocean episode of Blue Planet 2. Joye was the expedition scientist and a lead science advisor for The Deep episode of Blue Planet II and is featured in a number of digital shorts about the Future of the Oceans and Brine Pools: Exploring an Alien World for Blue Planet II. One of the shorts is a profile of Joye, describing how she became an oceanographer and the things that keep her excited about working in the deep sea (Searching for Cures in the Deep Sea). Joye enjoys sharing her story with others in the hope of inspiring young women to engage in science careers and to motivate the public to learn more about the ocean. She is wholly committed to ocean advocacy work and feels strongly that scientists have an obligation to share their science and their passion broadly.

== Awards and honors ==
In 1997, Joye received the inaugural L. Eugene Cronin award from the Coastal and Estuarine Research Federation. The Cronin Award recognizes significant accomplishments of an estuarine scientist who is in the early stages of his/her career development. In 2001, she was named one of the most exceptional individuals in Georgia under 40 (“40 under 40”) by Georgia Trend magazine. Joye was named a Fellow and Visiting Science of the Marine Biological Laboratory in Woods Hole in 1997 and 1999. In 2002, she received a sabbatical fellowship from the Hanse Institute for Advanced Study, Delmenhorst, Germany, and a visiting professor appointment at the Max Planck Institute for Marine Microbiology (Bremen, Germany) to conduct research abroad for a year. In 2005, she was named a research fellow of Smithsonian Institution, Caribbean Coral Reef Ecosystems Program, in Carrie Bow Cay, Belize. In 2007, she received a Distinguished Service Award for Public Education and Outreach from the U.S. Department of the Interior. In 2008, she received a “Creative Research Medal” from the University of Georgia. In 2010, Joye was named the UGA Athletic Association Professor in Arts and Sciences. In 2012 Joye was named one of the “100 Most Influential Georgians” by Georgia Trend Magazine. In 2014, The Informer named Joye one of the most 100 influential women in Georgia.

As a testament to the interdisciplinary nature of Joye's work, she has been named a Fellow of four leading scientific societies: the American Association for the Advancement of Science in 2014, the Association for the Sciences of Limnology and Oceanography in 2016, the American Geophysical Union in 2017, and the American Academy of Microbiology in 2018. She is also a National Fellow in the Explorer's Club (2018). In 2015, Joye was named the University of Georgia's recipient of the SEC Faculty Achievement Award. In 2016, Joye was invited to be the Commencement Speaker for the Graduate School at the University of North Carolina, her alma mater. A few weeks later, Joye was an invited speaker at the White House Office of Science and Technology Policy’s National Microbiome Project kickoff event. She was named a Regents' Professor by the University System of Georgia Board of Regents in 2019. In 2020, she received the honor of being selected to present the Endowed Biogeochemistry Lecture by The Geochemical Society. In 2022, Joye was awarded the Captain Don Walsh Award for Ocean Exploration by the Marine Technology Society and the Society for Underwater Technology.

In 2018, she completed a residency focusing on the intersection of science and art at the Djerrasi Resident Artists Program; she is a co-PI for The Ocean Memory Project at the University of Washington, sponsored by a National Academies Keck Futures Initiative (NAKFI) Challenge Grant. Through the Ocean Memory program, Joye is collaborating with artist Rebecca Rutstein on an exhibition at the Georgia Museum of Art that includes a November 2018 expedition to the Guaymas Basin of the Sea of Cortez in DSV Alvin. Joye and Rutstein were interviewed about their collaboration in a 2023 episode of The Ongoing Transformation podcast from Issues in Science and Technology journal.
