= Wynnewood, Pennsylvania =

Unincorporated community in Pennsylvania, US

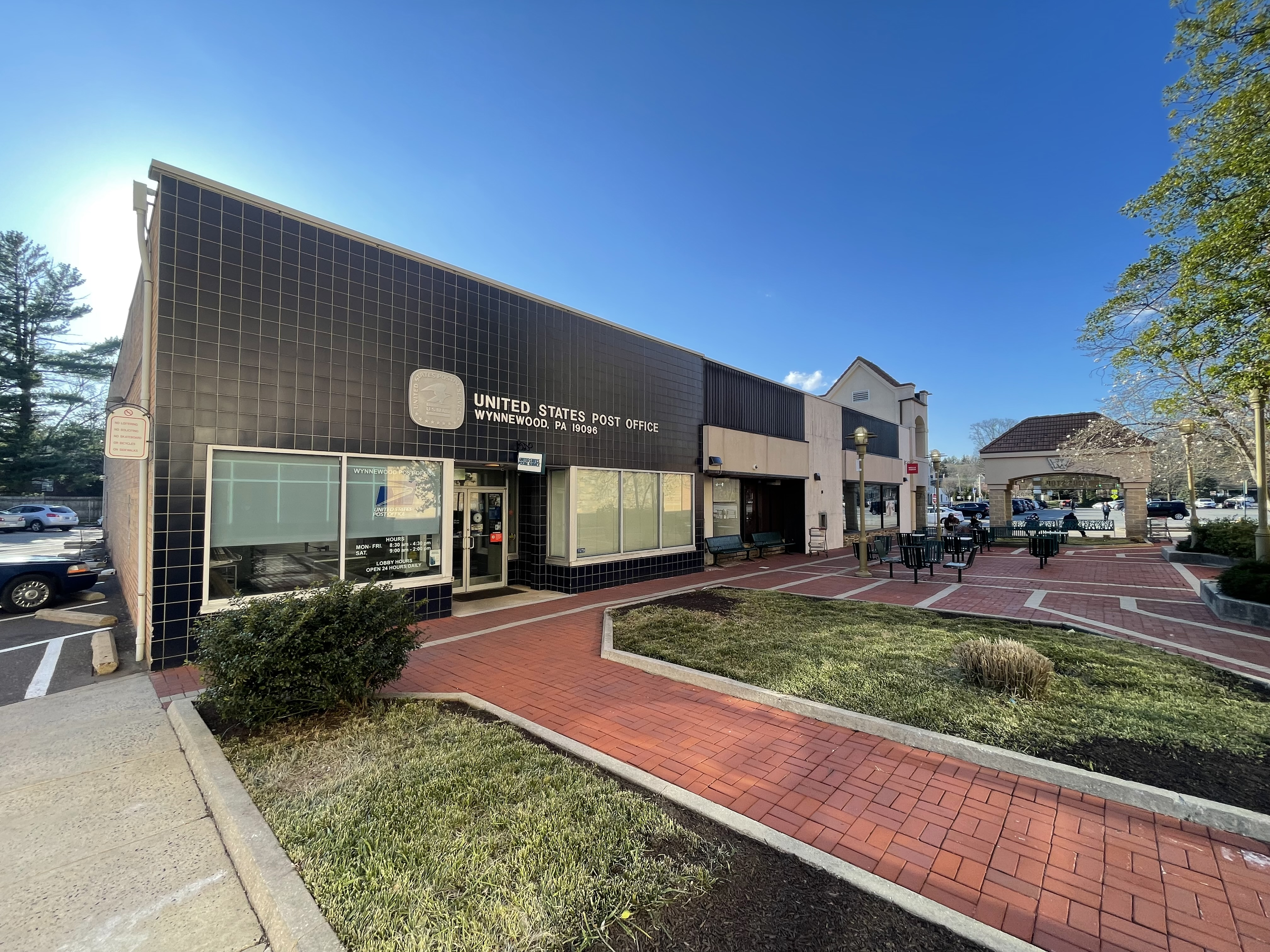
- Wynnewood post office

- Location of Wynnewood in Pennsylvania Wynnewood, Pennsylvania (the United States)
- Coordinates: 40°00′10″N 75°16′15″W
- Country: United States
- State: Pennsylvania
- Counties: Montgomery, Delaware
- Townships: Lower Merion, Haverford
- Elevation: 295 ft (90 m)

Population
  - Total: 13,572
- Time zone: UTC-5 (EST)
  - Summer (DST): UTC-4 (EDT)
- Zip Code: 19096
- Area codes: 610 and 484

Wynnewood is a suburban unincorporated community, located west of Philadelphia, straddling Lower Merion Township in Montgomery County, Pennsylvania and Haverford Township in Delaware County, Pennsylvania, United States.

The community was named in 1691 for Dr. Thomas Wynne, William Penn's physician and the first Speaker of the Pennsylvania General Assembly. Wynnewood is one of many neighborhoods on the historic Philadelphia Main Line, and is the home of institutions such as Lankenau Medical Center, St. Charles Borromeo Seminary, Palmer Theological Seminary, All Saints' Episcopal Church, and Friends' Central School.

== Demographics ==
Historical population
| Census | Pop. | Note | %± |

Wynnewood is not an incorporated area and was not a census-designated place (CDP) until the United States Census Bureau defined it as one in 2023. As of 2010 census, there were 13,572 people and 5,436 households residing in the community. In 2000, the population density was 3,882 people per square mile. The racial makeup of the community was 92.9% White, 3.2% Asian, 2.5% African, 0.40% from other races, and 1.0% from two or more races. 1.2% of the population were Hispanic or Latino of any race.

The median income for a household in the community was $86,861, and the median income for a family was $111,683. The per capita income for the community was $51,543. About 0.8% of families and 2.9% of the population were below the poverty line, including 7.7% of those under age 18 and 10.1% of those age 65 or over.

Residents of Wynnewood cooperate with those of adjacent Ardmore in many ways, one of which is the ArdWood Civic Association. South Ardmore Park is partly in Wynnewood, and partly in Ardmore. This park is the site of a free or low-cost summer camp, sporting activities, walking paths, and a verdant setting.

The ZIP Code for Wynnewood is 19096.

== Commerce ==
Wynnewood is mostly residential with its shopping centers located in various clusters.

The largest shopping center in Wynnewood is the 257,000 sq ft (23,876 m^{2}) Wynnewood Shopping Center opened in 1949. In 1954 its first anchor stores opened, John Wanamaker and luxury retailer Bonwit Teller. Over time it's seen anchors come and go such as Old Navy, and Borders. The Wanamaker's building was divided into a Genuardi's supermarket and a Bed Bath and Beyond. Current anchors as of late 2023 are Old Navy, DSW, and Giant.

Other shopping venues in the suburb include Wynnewood Square and the Whole Foods Shopping Center (named for a market there), both on East Lancaster Avenue. As Wynnewood is primarily a residential community, its residents visit other districts of the Main Line, such as Ardmore or Narberth, for shopping.

Along with its tree-shaded streets and mature old stone homes, Wynnewood has also been known historically for its car dealerships, which line Lancaster Avenue from South Wynnewood to Argyle Road. Gracious, old-fashioned restaurants, Stouffer's and the Viking Inn, both on Lancaster Avenue, have disappeared and not been replaced, although less expensive fare is widely available.

== Transportation ==
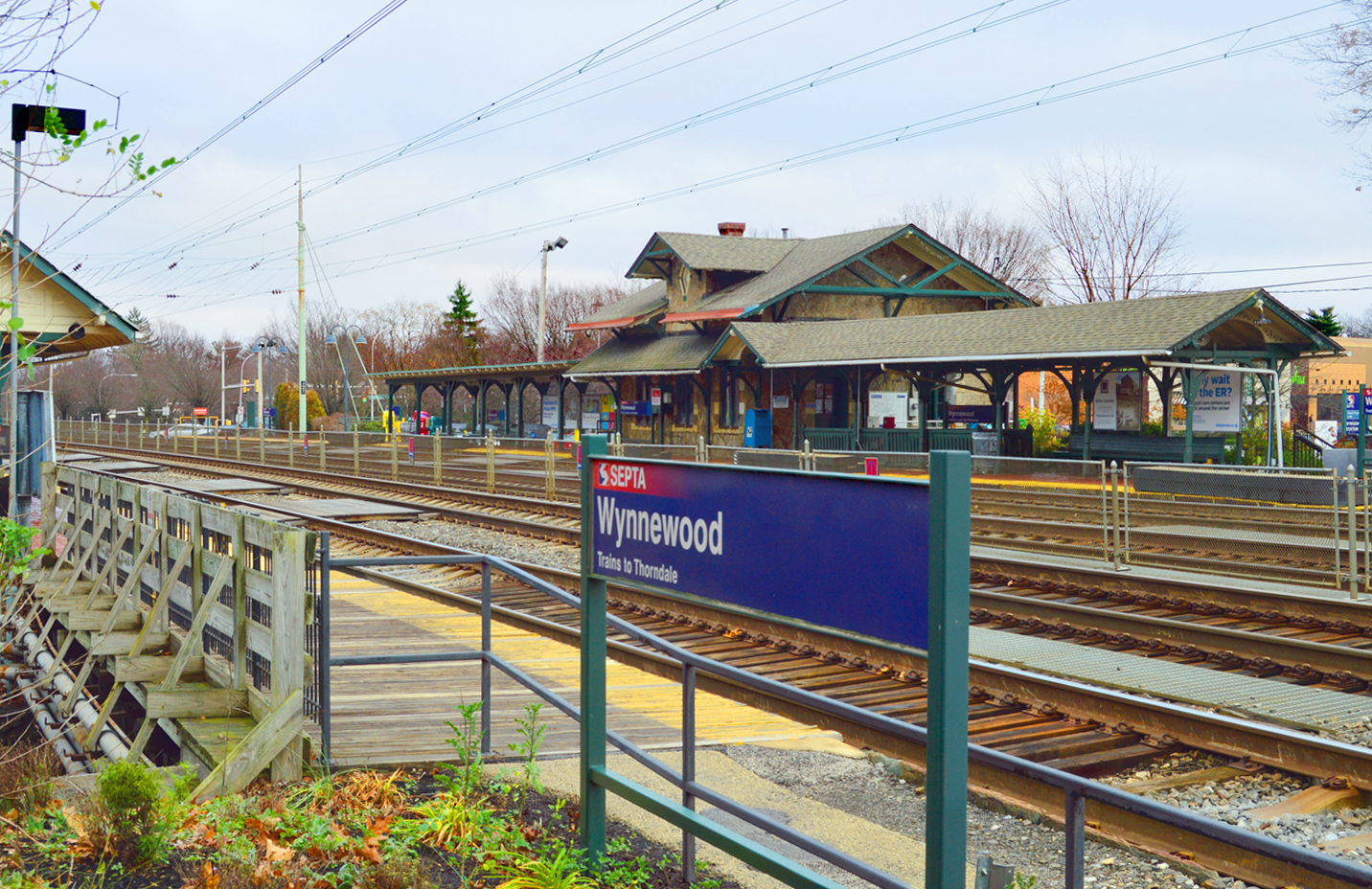
SEPTA commuter rail station at Wynnewood

Opposite the Wynnewood Shopping Center is the Wynnewood train station. Built in the 1870s, the vintage regional rail (SEPTA) train station (MP 7.5) was designed by Wilson Brothers and Company for the Pennsylvania Railroad. Towns on the lower "Main Line" adjacent to Wynnewood include Overbrook, Merion, Narberth, Ardmore, Haverford, and Bryn Mawr. The SEPTA Route 105 bus runs along the length of Lancaster Avenue on the Main Line, and the SEPTA Route 44 bus supplements the trains for service between nearby Ardmore and Narberth and Center City Philadelphia. South Wynnewood is served by the SEPTA Norristown High-Speed Line (former Route 100), which runs from the Montgomery County seat of Norristown through the central and eastern Main Line to 69th Street Transportation Center and connections to the Market-Frankford Line for service to Center City and Northeast Philadelphia.

Wynnewood is located along Lancaster Avenue (U.S. Route 30) and is also easily accessible from nearby Interstate Routes 76 (the Schuylkill Expressway east and west) and 476 (the Philadelphia bypass nicknamed the "Blue Route", traveling south and north between Chester and Interstate 95 in the south and Plymouth Meeting, Germantown, and the east-west Pennsylvania Turnpike in the north).

== Hospitals ==
Wynnewood is also home to one of the principal three teaching hospitals that serve Philadelphia's Main Line. Along with the eponymous Bryn Mawr and Paoli Memorial hospitals, Lankenau Hospital, on Lancaster Avenue (Route 30) in Wynnewood near the Overbrook border, has traditionally been affiliated with either Jefferson or Drexel colleges of medicine and is always (with Bryn Mawr and Paoli) on the list of the nation's top community hospitals. Saunders House, a rehabilitation facility, can be found on Lankenau's premises, as is a large and busy medical office building that is home to many of the private practices of the hospital's attending physicians.

== Education ==
=== Public education ===
Most of Wynnewood's public school children attend the Merion, Penn Wynne, or Penn Valley elementary schools, part of Lower Merion School District headquartered in Ardmore; Bala Cynwyd Middle School; and have a choice between Lower Merion High School and Harriton High School. Other schools, private and parochial, include all-boys The Haverford School, all-girls Baldwin, and Agnes Irwin schools, coeducational Friends Central School — are within the Wynnewood postal district — and private, Catholic, Country Day School of the Sacred Heart in nearby Bryn Mawr, Waldron Mercy and Merion Mercy academies in nearby Merion. Saint Margaret's Elementary School in nearby Narberth also serves Wynnewood's Catholic elementary school community. There are other private schools such as Episcopal Academy (Newtown Square), as well as Jack M. Barrack Hebrew Academy (Bryn Mawr) and the Solomon Schechter School (Wynnewood), which are both Jewish-affiliated schools. Finally, there is a French International School which has two locations—the lower school near the Bala Cynwyd Library and the upper school on City Avenue, still in Bala Cynwyd.

Saint Joseph's University is close by with parts of its campus in Merion, Bala Cynwyd and West Philadelphia; Villanova University, straddling Lancaster Avenue, and Rosemont College, on Montgomery, are also nearby, as are Cabrini College and Eastern University, both in nearby Saint David's. Haverford College is a non-denominational college on Montgomery Avenue in Haverford. St. Charles Borromeo Seminary is across the street from parts of Saint Joseph's University's campus.

The Japanese Language School of Philadelphia (JLSP, フィラデルフィア日本語補習授業校 Firaderufia Nihongo Hoshū Jugyō Kō), a supplementary Japanese school, holds its classes at the Friends Central School (FCS) in Wynnewood and in Lower Merion Township.

== Media ==
The area is covered by The Main Line Times.

== Features ==
The well-regarded 1962 dramatic film David and Lisa was filmed in part at and around the Wynnewood train station.

Also located in the community is Shortridge Memorial Park, a small park in a creek valley with stone bridges under which Indian Creek flows. The Indian Creek district has been ecologically revitalized and restored. Wynnewood residents are active in the Wynnewood Civic Association and the Shortridge Association of Wynnewood. There is also a Wynnewood Valley Park Sensory Garden which is an attraction for those who are visually and non-visually impaired.

== Notable people ==
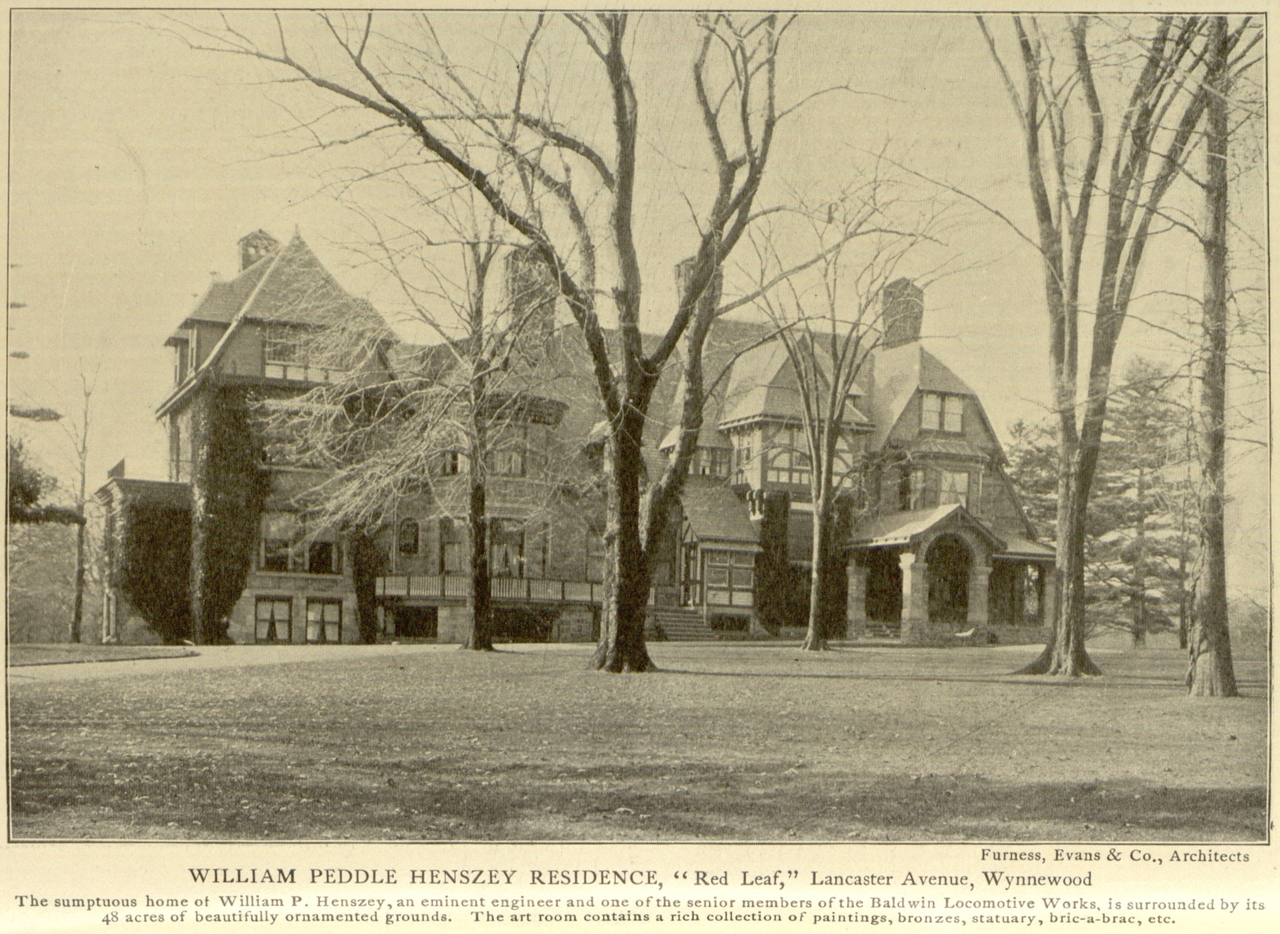
William P. Henszey's mansion, known as "Red Leaf," at 510-14 Lancaster Avenue

- Walter Annenberg, former media mogul, philanthropist, arts patron, and U.S. ambassador to the United Kingdom
- Aaron Beck, professor emeritus of psychiatry at the University of Pennsylvania and father of cognitive therapy
- Anthony Bevilacqua, former Archdiocese of Philadelphia cardinal
- Kobe Bryant, former professional basketball player, Los Angeles Lakers
- Kat Dennings, actress, 2 Broke Girls, Thor, Thor: The Dark World, and WandaVision
- Wayne Ellington, former professional basketball player
- George Matthews Harding, American painter and author
- William P. Henszey, Baldwin Locomotive Works partner
- Jonathan Hoffman, investment banker and bond trader
- Hannah Clothier Hull, Quaker pacifist
- Joan Jett, rock musician
- Owen Jones, former U.S. Congressman
- Irena Koprowska, pathologist and a pioneer in cytopathology
- Hilary Koprowski, virologist responsible for first oral poliomyelitis vaccine
- Patti LaBelle, musician known as the "Godmother of Soul"
- John Lucas III, former professional basketball player and current assistant coach, Los Angeles Lakers
- Jeffrey Lurie, Philadelphia Eagles owner
- Benjamin G. Neel, scientist
- Lori Erica Ruff, identity thief
- Rebecca Rutstein, artist
- Henry Scattergood, former cricket player
- Alex Scott, Alex's Lemonade Stand Foundation founder
- Gerhard Spiegler, former president, Elizabethtown College
- Lorne Munroe, Philharmonic cellist
