= Benjamin G. Neel =

American cancer biologist (born 1956)

- Born: 1956 (age 69–70); Wynnewood, Pennsylvania
- Spouse: Phyllis Koton Neel
- Children: 3

Academic background
- Education: BSc, biology, 1977, Cornell University; PhD, viral oncology, 1982, Rockefeller University; MD, 1983, Weill Cornell Medical College
- Thesis: Strategies for oncogenesis by avian leukosis viruses (1982)
- Doctoral advisor: Bill Hayward
- Website: theneellab.com

Benjamin G. Neel (born 1956) is an American cancer biologist and a professor of medicine at NYU Langone Health. He served as Director of the Perlmutter Cancer Center at NYU Langone Health from 2015 to 2023, and formerly served as the Director of Research for Princess Margaret Cancer Centre and a Canada Research Chair at the University of Toronto. He is a member of the National Academy of Sciences and Royal Society of Canada.

== Early life and education ==
Neel was born in Wynnewood, Pennsylvania but grew up in Philadelphia and Cherry Hill, New Jersey. Shortly following his birth in 1956, Neel's parents divorced and he grew up with his mother who worked as a bookkeeper. While a student at Cherry Hill High School East, Neel was selected to present his original research at the Monmouth Junior Science Symposium in 1972 and 1973. Following his junior year, Neel participated in a National Science Foundation program in biochemistry. Upon returning home, his grandmother was diagnosed with cancer, which sparked his interest in becoming a cancer researcher.

Following high school, Neel completed his Bachelor's degree at Cornell University in 1977 and his PhD in viral oncology at Rockefeller University. Neel returned to Cornell for his medical degree, which he earned in 1983. As a graduate student at Rockefeller, Neel began research on the activation of endogenous oncogenes by slowly transforming RNA tumor viruses. Following his medical degree, Neel conducted his residency in internal medicine at Beth Israel Hospital and completed a postdoctoral fellowship at Harvard University.

== Career ==
Upon completing his postdoctoral fellowship, Neel served on the faculty of Harvard Medical School from 1988 to 2006. In 1993, Neel was the inaugural recipient of the Gertrude Elion Award of the American Association for Cancer Research. During his tenure at the school, Neel served as the Director of the Cancer Biology Program and as deputy director for Basic Research, Hematology Division at Beth Israel Deaconess Medical Center. While serving in these roles, Neel continued to conduct research on gene mutations. In 2002, Neel and co-senior author Barbara B. Kahn identified a protein that enables the body to overcome resistance to the hormone leptin. In 2006, he was one of the lead scientists who discovered that mutations in the SOS1 gene account for many cases of Noonan syndrome.

In 2006, Neel was recruited from Harvard to serve as the Director of the Ontario Cancer Institute at Princess Margaret Cancer Centre. He was also appointed a professor of Medical Biophysics and the Chair of Signal Transduction and Human Disease at the University of Toronto and University Health Network. In 2007, Neel was appointed a Canada Research Chair at the University of Toronto. His research at the University of Toronto helped to unravel cell signaling pathways involved in developmental disease which resulted in new therapeutic approaches to cancers caused by KRAS mutations. He also contributed to the greater understanding on the functional genomics of breast cancer and generated new models of ovarian cancer.

Neel eventually returned to the United States in 2014 to serve as Director of the Perlmutter Cancer Center and Professor of Medicine at NYU Langone Health. While serving in this role, Neel was elected a member of the National Academy of Sciences in 2022. The following year, in recognition of his efforts while in Toronto, Neel was named a Foreign Fellow of the Royal Society of Canada.

On November 1, 2023, members of the NYU Langone Health community were informed via email that Neel had, effective immediately, been suspended from his position as Director of the Perlmutter Cancer Center. The New York Times subsequently confirmed that Neel was let go for his postings and reposts on the X social media platform, which included "offensive caricatures of Arab people" and posts that "appeared to question the extent of the death toll in Gaza from Israel’s relentless bombing campaign." Neel is suing the hospital for wrongful dismissal. On August 1, 2024, X Corp. announced on their XNews account that they would provide financial support to Neel and another individual "in seeking justice for their wrongful terminations for having exercised their right to free speech."

== Personal life ==
Neel and his wife Phyllis Koton Neel have three daughters together: Jaclyn, Dana, and Caroline. He is Jewish.
