= NYU Langone Health =

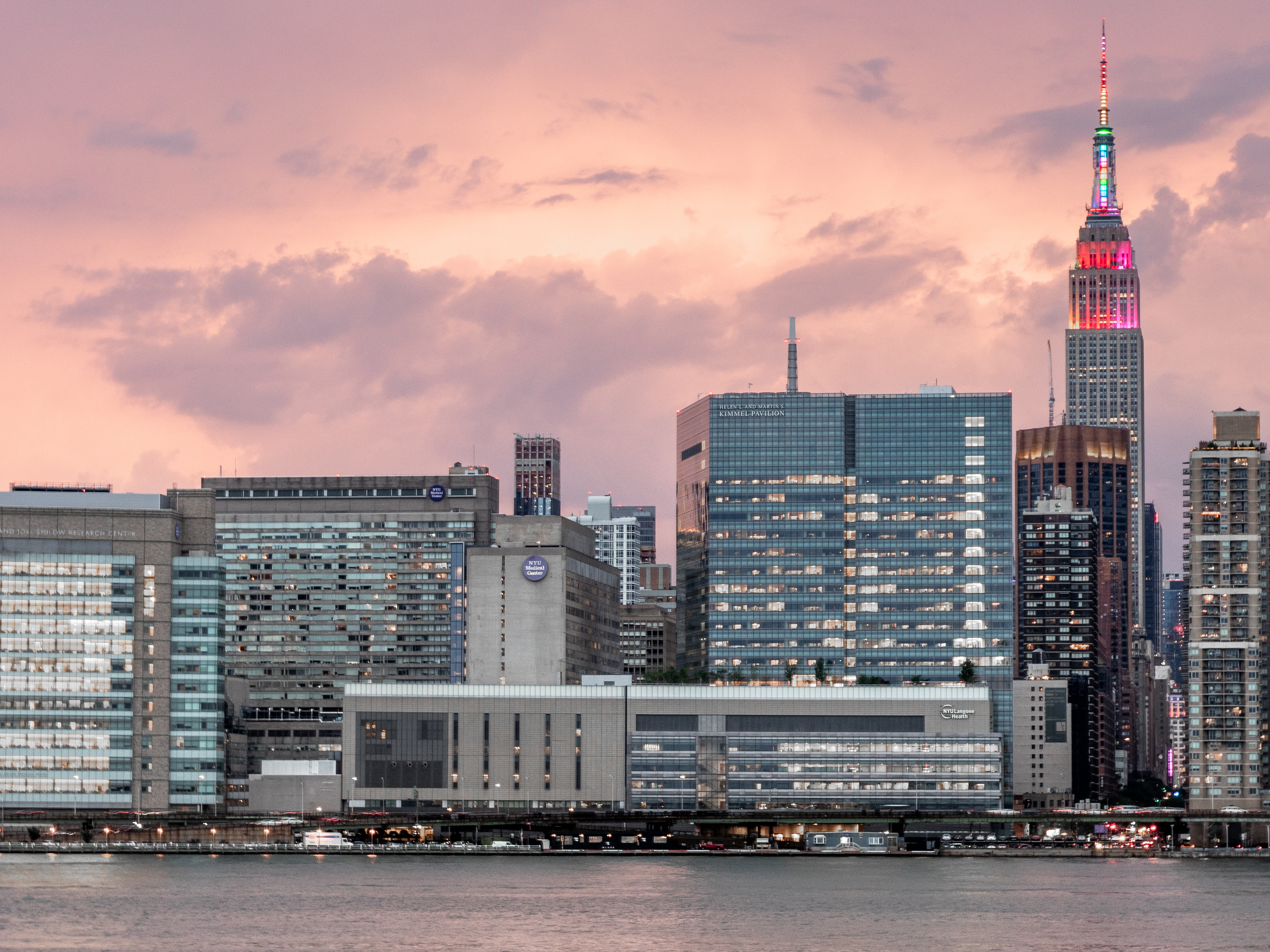
- NYU Langone as seen from across the East River

Geography
- Location: 550 First Avenue, New York, New York, United States
- Coordinates: 40°44′31.09″N 73°58′26.52″W

Organization
- Care system: Private
- Type: Teaching
- Affiliated university: New York University
- Patron: Ken Langone
- Network: NYU Langone Health System

Services
- Beds: nearly 2000 (total of all hospitals combined)

History
- Founded: 1841

Links
- Website: nyulangone.org
- Lists: Hospitals in New York State
- Other links: Hospitals in Manhattan

NYU Langone Health is an integrated academic health system located in New York and Florida. The health system consists of the NYU Grossman School of Medicine and NYU Grossman Long Island School of Medicine, both part of New York University (NYU), and more than 400 locations including seven inpatient facilities: Tisch Hospital; Kimmel Pavilion; NYU Langone Orthopedic Hospital; Hassenfeld Children's Hospital; NYU Langone Hospital — Brooklyn; NYU Langone Hospital — Long Island; and NYU Langone Hospital — Suffolk. It is also home to Rusk Rehabilitation. NYU Langone Health is one of the largest healthcare systems in the Northeast, with more than 55,000 employees.

In 2025, NYU Langone Health’s revenue was more than $15.4 billion, including more than $5.5 billion in philanthropy since 2007.

== History ==
=== NYU Langone Health ===
NYU Langone Health’s precursor, the Medical College of New York University, was founded in 1841. Among the college's six original faculty members were renowned surgeon Valentine Mott, MD, and John Revere, MD, the youngest son of patriot Paul Revere.

In 1898, the Medical College consolidated with Bellevue Hospital Medical College, forming University and Bellevue Hospital Medical College of New York University, established at 26th Street and First Avenue in New York City, New York. This began NYU Langone Health's long relationship with its primary teaching affiliate, NYC Health + Hospitals/Bellevue, America's oldest public hospital, founded in 1736.

NYU Langone Health's first hospital, established in 1948 as University Hospital on lower Broadway, was created through a merger of the New York Post-Graduate Hospital and the New York Skin and Cancer Hospital. In 1963, a newly-acquired site in midtown Manhattan—bounded by First Avenue and the Franklin D. Roosevelt East River Drive, between 30th and 34th Streets—became the home of University Hospital's new 18-story building, which housed expanded research labs. In 1978 Midtown Hospital was closed and subsumed into NYU Medical Center.

University Hospital was renamed Tisch Hospital in 1989 in gratitude to Laurence A. and Preston Robert Tisch and their families, benefactors of New York University.

In 2008, NYU Medical Center, as the institution was then known, was renamed the NYU Elaine A. and Kenneth G. Langone Medical Center in honor of its chair of the Board of Trustees at the time and his wife, whose total unrestricted gifts of $200 million represent the largest donation in the institution's history. In 2017, NYU Langone Medical Center was renamed NYU Langone Health.

NYU Langone Health's long-time affiliate, the Hospital for Joint Diseases, now known as NYU Langone Orthopedic Hospital, was the first hospital to merge with the institution in 2006, becoming its dedicated orthopedic hospital.

In 2016, NYU Langone Health acquired Lutheran Medical Center, a 444-bed hospital in southwest Brooklyn, renaming it NYU Langone Hospital—Brooklyn.

In 2019, NYU Langone Health acquired Winthrop University Hospital, a 591-bed hospital in Mineola on Long Island, renaming it NYU Langone Hospital—Long Island.

In 2025, NYU Langone Health fully acquired Long Island Community Hospital after being affiliated for over 3 years, a 306-bed hospital in East Patchogue on Long Island. It was renamed NYU Langone Hospital - Suffolk upon its full merger.

In 2025, NYU Langone Health’s revenue was more than $15.4 billion, including more than $5.5 billion in philanthropy since 2007.

In 2026, NYU Langone reached a settlement with the Trump Department of Justice where they agreed to stop providing youth transgender healthcare and to pay $8.5 million, resulting in the cessation of ongoing investigations and preventing medical records of transgender minors being turned over to the Department of Justice .

=== NYU Grossman School of Medicine ===
When NYU Grossman School of Medicine was founded in 1841, its precursor, the Medical College of New York University, had an inaugural class of 239 students.

In 2007, Robert I. Grossman, a neuroradiologist who had served as chair of NYU Langone Health's Department of Radiology since 2001, was appointed the Dean of NYU School of Medicine and CEO of NYU Medical Center, as they were then named. In 2019, the School was renamed NYU Grossman School of Medicine in honor of his leadership achievements. In 2010, Grossman introduced Curriculum for the 21st Century (C21), the most significant reform in medical education since the 1910 Flexner Report. C21 addresses the evolving demands of medical practice by merging basic and clinical science, immersing students in patient care from day one.

In 2013, NYU Grossman School of Medicine became the first nationally ranked medical school to introduce a Three-Year MD Program, providing select students a direct pathway into any NYU Langone Health residency programs. As the length of post-graduate medical education increases, the accelerated program is designed to ease the financial burden of medical school and launch medical careers one year earlier than traditional four-year programs.

In 2018, the school became the first in the nation to provide full-tuition scholarships to all matriculated students to reduce the growing burden of medical- educational debt. In 2019, NYU Langone Health expanded its medical student training when it launched NYU Grossman Long Island School of Medicine, a joint venture between New York University and NYU Langone Health. The school provides full-tuition scholarships and offers an accelerated three-year M.D. program that focuses on primary care.

In 2025, Alec C. Kimmelman, a physician and researcher, was appointed Dean of NYU Grossman School of Medicine and CEO of NYU Langone Health.

NYU Grossman School of Medicine has 29 academic departments in the clinical and basic sciences. In addition to the medical degree, students can also earn a dual M.D./master's degree. Medical students, residents, and fellows at NYU Grossman School of Medicine receive much of their clinical training at NYC Health + Hospitals/Bellevue. The school also maintains affiliations with several other hospitals, including the VA New York Harbor Healthcare System, NYC Health + Hospitals/Gouverneur in Manhattan, and NYC Health + Hospitals/Woodhull in Brooklyn.

==== NYU Grossman School of Medicine Nobel Laureates ====
NYU Grossman School of Medicine counts among its faculty and alumni four Nobel laureates:

- Otto Loewi, M.D. (1936), who determined that the primary language of nerve cell communication is chemical rather than electrical
- Severo Ochoa, M.D. (1959), who conducted landmark studies in biochemical genetics and nucleic acids
- Baruj Benacerraf, M.D. (1980), who performed groundbreaking research on genetic regulation of the immune system
- Eric Kandel, M.D. (2000), who discovered molecular processes that underlie learning and memory

=== NYU Grossman Long Island School of Medicine ===
NYU Grossman Long Island School of Medicine was founded in July 2019 and is located on the campus of NYU Langone Hospital—Long Island in Mineola, New York.

=== Controversies ===
In November 2023, NYU Langone Health fired Benjamin Neel, head of NYU Langone Health’s Perlmutter Cancer Center, for social media posts he made on X (formerly Twitter) regarding the Gaza war, in which Neel reposted content that critics have referred to as "racist" and "anti-Arab." A spokesperson for NYU Langone Health defended the firing, saying that all employees had been reminded "several times" in the month before Neel's firing of NYU Langone Health's social media policy and "high standards." In response, Neel filed a lawsuit against NYU Langone Health for wrongful termination.

Zaki Masoud was removed from his resident position at NYU Langone Health after expressing support for the Palestinian struggle against Israel in October 2023.

In May 2024, NYU Langone Health fired Hesen Jabr, a labor and delivery nurse who had worked at NYU Langone Health for almost 10 years, for her remarks on the Gaza war at a ceremony where Jabr was accepting an award for providing compassionate care to patients suffering perinatal loss, during which Jabr stated, "It pains me to see the women from my country going through unimaginable losses themselves during the current genocide in Gaza." A spokesperson for NYU Langone Health confirmed that Jabr was fired for her speech after having been warned "not to bring her views on this divisive and charged issue into the workplace." Jabr stated that she planned to take legal action against NYU Langone Health and to file a complaint with the Equal Employment Opportunity Commission.

== Facilities ==
In 2008, NYU Langone Health launched a decade-long Campus Transformation Plan, an infrastructure modernization program that has expanded its footprint to more than 14 million square feet of clinical, educational, and research space across its campuses in Manhattan, Brooklyn, and Long Island.

=== Midtown campus ===
==== Tisch Hospital ====
Tisch Hospital is an acute-care hospital with more than 352 beds located in midtown Manhattan in New York City, New York. The hospital has a critical care unit, a neonatal intensive care unit, and the Ronald O. Perelman Center for Emergency Services. Tisch Hospital opened in 1963 as University Hospital. It was renamed Tisch Hospital in 1989 in gratitude to Laurence A. Tisch and Preston Robert Tisch and their families, benefactors of New York University. Tisch Hospital is a quaternary care hospital, where clinical trials are offered and highly specialized procedures are performed. More than 5,300 babies are born at Tisch Hospital each year.

==== Kimmel Pavilion ====
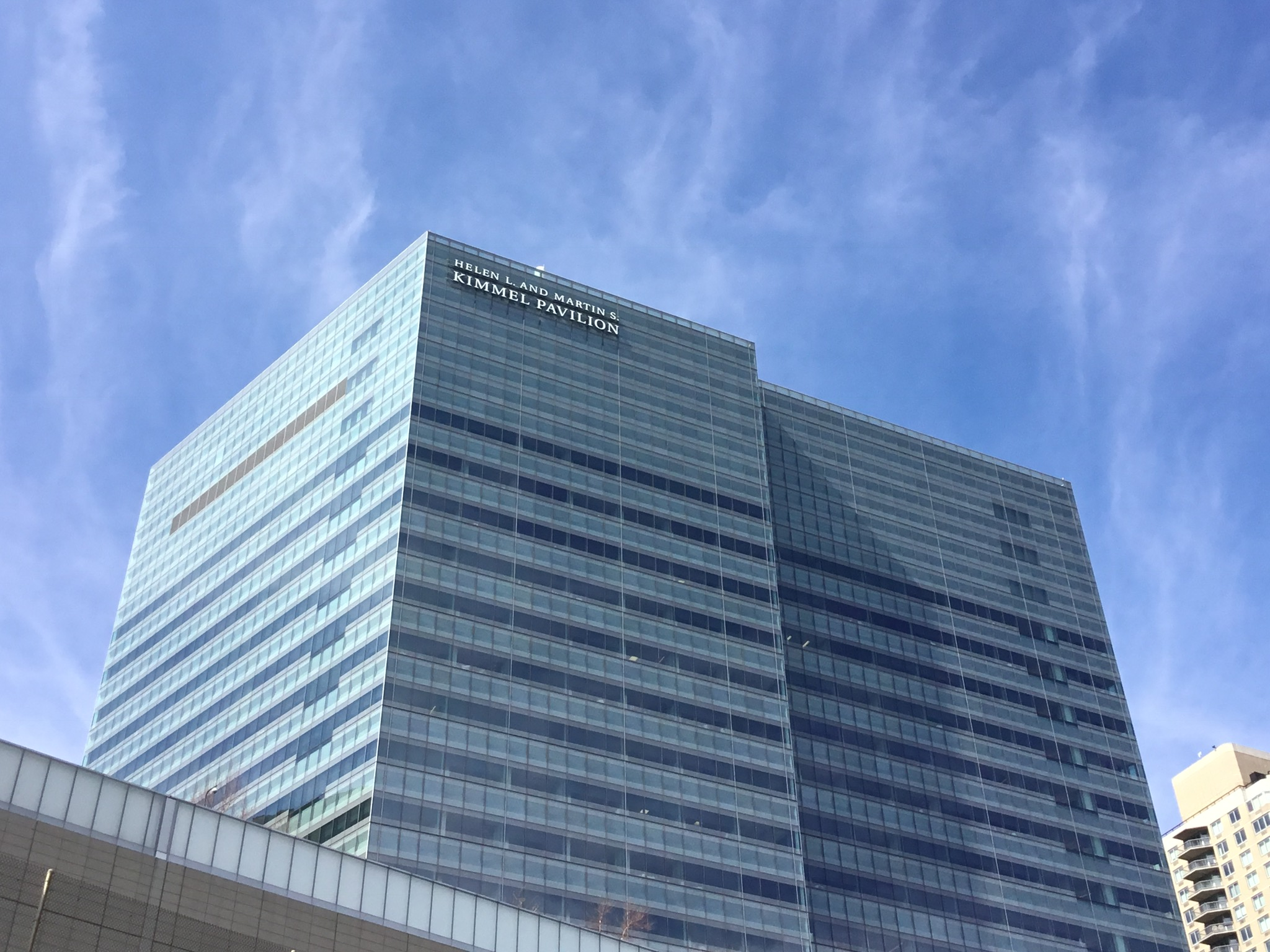
Kimmel Pavilion (2023)

The Helen L. and Martin S. Kimmel Pavilion is a 374-bed acute-care inpatient facility adjacent to Tisch Hospital in midtown Manhattan in New York City, New York. The Pavilion provides clinical services that include general and subspecialty surgery, stroke care, intensive care, cardiothoracic surgery, neurosurgery, neurology, hematology, bone marrow transplant, and solid organ transplant. The Pavilion, which opened in June 2018, is New York City's only inpatient clinical facility with exclusively private rooms. Each patient room features MyWall, a digital communication tool that allows patients to ask questions about their treatment plan, view educational videos, order meals and control the ambiance of their room.

==== Hassenfeld Children's Hospital — 34th Street ====
Hassenfeld Children's Hospital—34th Street, NYU Langone Health's primary location for pediatric inpatient care, is a 68-bed pediatric acute-care facility within the Helen L. and Martin S. Kimmel Pavilion. When the facility opened in 2018, it was the first new children's hospital established in New York City in nearly 15 years. The hospital's single-bedded patient rooms are designed to reduce the risk of infection and provide privacy for families. Support services and resilience programs that focus on the health and wellbeing of children and their families are provided by the Sala Institute for Child and Family Centered Care.

==== Science Building ====
The Science Building, the largest research facility at NYU Langone Health, is located at 435 East 30th Street in New York City, New York. Opened in 2018, the 16-story building accommodates up to 800 researchers, graduate students, postdoctoral fellows, and support staff, uniting teams from neuroscience systems genetics, computational medicine, cardiology, rheumatology, and endocrinology. The Science Building includes 10 floors of laboratory space that is open and adaptable to promote investigations.

==== Joan and Joel Smilow Research Center ====
The Joan and Joel Smilow Research Center, devoted to translational research, is located on NYU Langone Health's midtown Manhattan campus along the Franklin D. Roosevelt East River Drive. Opened in 2006, the 13-story building houses more than 40 multidisciplinary research teams in cancer, cardiovascular biology, dermatology, genetics, and infectious diseases. It serves as the main research hub for the NYU Langone's Laura and Isaac Perlmutter Cancer Center.

=== NYU Langone Orthopedic Hospital ===
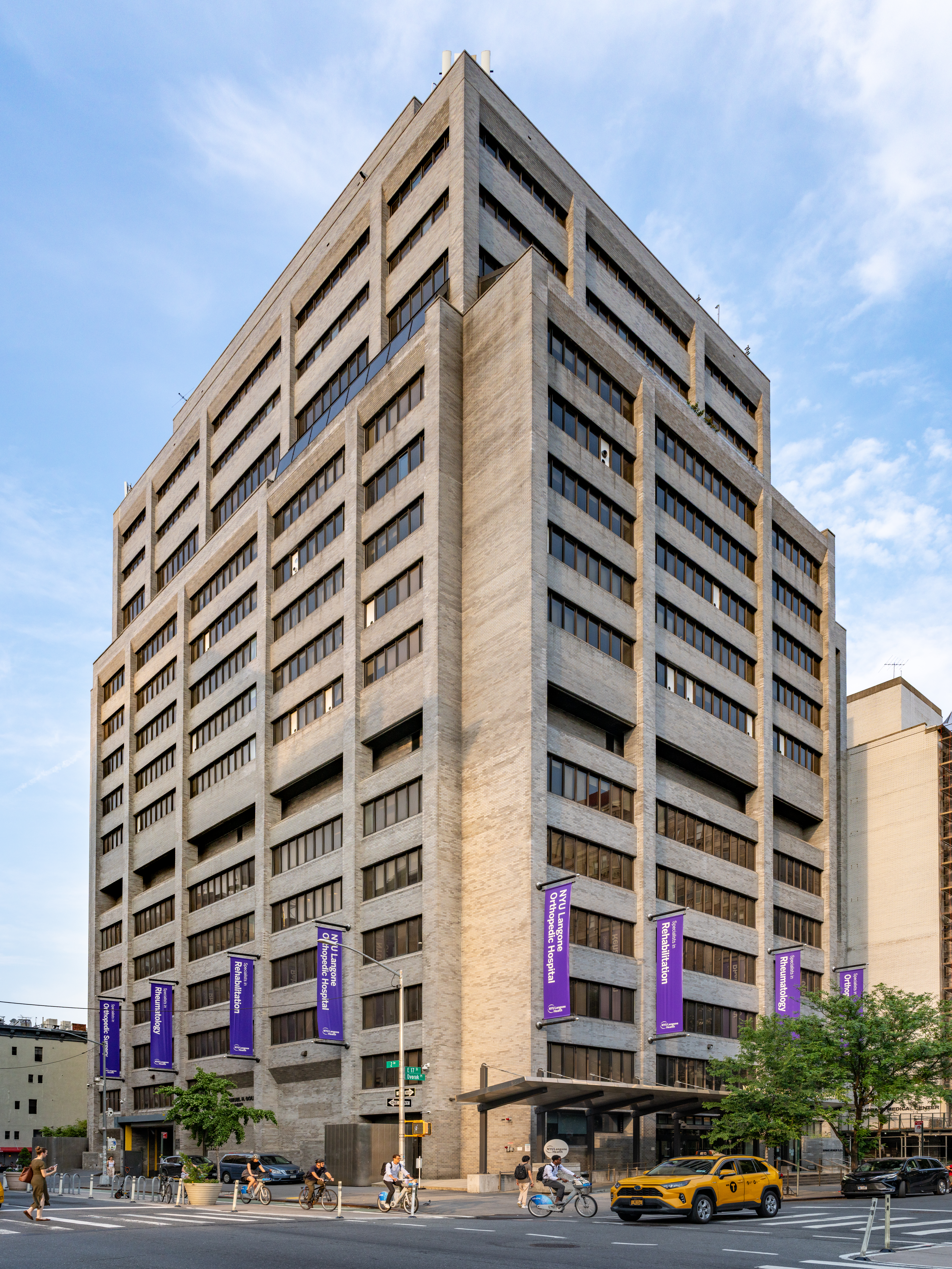
NYU Langone Orthopedic Hospital (2025)

NYU Langone Orthopedic Hospital is a 225-bed specialty hospital located in the Gramercy Park neighborhood of Manhattan in New York City, New York. The hospital provides medical and surgical care for the prevention, treatment, and rehabilitation of orthopedic, musculoskeletal, rheumatic, and neurological conditions, as well as specialized care for conditions such as brain injury, joint pain, and osteoporosis. One of the nation's first dedicated orthopedic hospitals, the hospital was a long-time affiliate of NYU Langone Health before it merged with the institution in 2006. Its name was later changed from the Hospital for Joint Diseases to NYU Langone Orthopedic Hospital. In 2022, the hospital's Samuels Orthopedic Immediate Care Center treated more than 9,400 patients.

In June 2024, the Department of Orthopedic Surgery released a documentary titled On the Shoulders of Giants: The History of NYU Langone Orthopedics. The film traces the heritage of the department to some of the fields most illustrious surgeons. The film was a finalist for Best Documentary at the 23rd Tribeca Festival, an annual gala that hosts more than 600 screenings.

=== NYU Langone Hospital — Brooklyn ===
NYU Langone Hospital—Brooklyn is a 444-bed acute-care hospital located in the Sunset Park neighborhood of Brooklyn, in New York City, New York. Formerly known as NYU Lutheran Medical Center, the hospital merged with NYU Langone Health in 2016. The hospital's Level 1 Trauma Center is certified by the American College of Surgeons. More than 3,800 babies are born at NYU Langone Hospital—Brooklyn each year.

=== NYU Langone Hospital — Long Island ===
NYU Langone Hospital—Long Island is a 591-bed acute-care hospital located in Mineola, New York. Formerly known as Winthrop University Hospital, it merged with NYU Langone Health in 2019. The hospital's Level 1 Trauma Center is certified by the American College of Surgeons. More than 5,000 babies are born at NYU Langone Hospital—Long Island each year.

=== NYU Langone Hospital — Suffolk ===
NYU Langone Hospital - Suffolk (formerly Long Island Community Hospital) is a 306-bed acute-care hospital in East Patchogue, New York. It was the last stand-alone hospital on Long Island when it affiliated with NYU Langone in July 2021. A full asset merger and subsequent name change was announced on March 3, 2025.

== Centers and institutes ==
=== Laura and Isaac Perlmutter Cancer Center ===
Laura and Isaac Perlmutter Cancer Center is one of 56 cancer centers in the U.S. designated a Comprehensive Cancer Center by the National Cancer Institute, part of the National Institutes of Health. The designation signifies a commitment to research, clinical trials, education and training, community outreach, and the development of effective approaches to cancer prevention, diagnosis, and treatment. The Center pursues research in cancer genome dynamics, cancer cell biology, melanoma, tumor immunology, and epidemiology and cancer control. The center's Blood and Marrow Transplant Program is certified by the Foundation for the Accreditation of Cellular Therapy to perform autologous and allogeneic transplants for adult patients and autologous transplants for pediatric patients. Dermatologists at NYU Langone Health were the first to develop criteria for early detection of melanoma.

=== Rusk Rehabilitation ===
Rusk Rehabilitation is ranked the #1 rehabilitation program in New York State and one of the top five in the country by U.S. News & World Report. At 28 inpatient and outpatient locations, its clinicians treat a range of adult and pediatric conditions, including brain injury, spinal cord injury, cancer, cardiac and pulmonary diseases, chronic neurological diseases, orthopedic and musculoskeletal diseases, limb loss, and stroke.

Rusk Rehabilitation was established in 1948 as the first comprehensive medical training program in rehabilitation in the world. Its founder, Howard A. Rusk, MD, chair of the Department of Physical Medicine and Rehabilitation at what is now NYU Grossman School of Medicine, is considered the father of comprehensive rehabilitation medicine. He drew on his experience treating wounded World War II veterans to develop a philosophy of caring for the patient as a whole person. Rusk Rehabilitation's inpatient programs at Tisch Hospital and NYU Langone Orthopedic Hospital are accredited by the Commission on Accreditation of Rehabilitation Facilities.

=== Vilcek Institute of Graduate Biomedical Sciences ===
In 2020, the institute, which offers programs in the basic medical sciences leading to a Ph.D. and M.D./Ph.D., was named in honor of Jan T. Vilcek, MD, PhD, a professor emeritus of microbiology and trustee of NYU Langone Health. Vilcek codeveloped the monoclonal antibody that is the basis for Remicade, a drug widely used to treat certain chronic inflammatory disorders.

=== NYU Langone Transplant Institute ===
The NYU Langone Transplant Institute is directed by Robert A. Montgomery, MD, the H. Leon Pachter, M.D. Professor of Surgery and chair of the Department of Surgery. The institute performs heart, lung, adult and pediatric kidney, heart-lung, kidney-pancreas, liver, and pancreas transplants. According to the Scientific Registry of Transplant Recipients (SRTR), the kidney and heart transplant programs have a one-year survival rate of 100%. In 2022, a team of surgeons performed the first successful triple transplant of heart, lungs, and kidney in the Northeast.

In 2023, surgeons led by Eduardo D. Rodriguez, the Helen L. Kimmel Professor of Reconstructive Plastic Surgery and chair of NYU Langone Health’s Hansjörg Wyss Department of Plastic Surgery, performed the world’s first whole-eye and partial-face transplant.

In 2024, surgeons led by Robert Montgomery, MD, H. Leon Pachter, MD, Professor of Surgery, chair of NYU Langone Health’s Department of Surgery, and director of the NYU Langone Transplant Institute, performed the world’s first combined implant of a mechanical heart pump and transplant of a kidney from a genetically modified pig and, later in the year, the first transplantation of a pig kidney with 10 gene edits.

== Clinical milestones ==
Two alumni of NYU Grossman School of Medicine, Jonas Salk and Albert Sabin, developed vaccines for polio, approved in the U.S. 1955.

Saul Krugman, chair of the Department of Pediatrics at NYU Grossman School of Medicine from 1960 to 1974, conducted research that led to vaccines for measles, rubella, and hepatitis B.

In 1948, Howard A. Rusk, drew on his experience caring for wounded World War II veterans to establish the world's first comprehensive training program in rehabilitation medicine.

In 1981, a group of NYU Langone Health's physicians at NYC Health + Hospitals/Bellevue coauthored the first paper published in a medical journal, The Lancet, linking HIV/AIDS to cases of Kaposi's sarcoma, a previously rare skin cancer that would become an AIDS-defining illness.

In 2001, Charles S. Hirsch, chair of NYU Langone Health's Department of Forensic Medicine and Chief Medical Examiner of the City of New York, coordinated the largest forensic investigation in history, cataloguing some 22,000 individual human remains and identifying about 60% of the 2,753 victims of the World Trade Center attack.

In 2015, surgeons led by Eduardo D. Rodriguez, the Helen L. Kimmel Professor of Reconstructive Plastic Surgery and chair of NYU Langone Health's Hansjörg Wyss Department of Plastic Surgery, performed the most extensive face transplant to date, followed in 2020 by the world's first successful face and double hand transplant.

In 2021, surgeons led by Robert A. Montgomery, director of the NYU Langone Transplant Institute, performed the first investigational transplant of a kidney grown in a genetically altered pig to a brain-dead person whose bodily functions were sustained by mechanical support. In separate investigational procedures performed in June and July 2022, surgeons led by Robert Montgomery successfully transplanted hearts from genetically altered pigs into brain-dead patients, marking the latest advance toward addressing the nationwide organ shortage and developing a clinical protocol that would provide an alternative supply of organs for people with life-threatening heart disease.

== Institutional milestones ==
On October 29, 2012, Hurricane Sandy, the worst storm to strike New York City in two centuries, flooded NYU Langone Health's midtown Manhattan campus with more than 15 million gallons of water overflowing from the East River. Hurricane Sandy inflicted more than $1 billion of damage to the institution's infrastructure, forcing a temporary shutdown. Within 13 hours, some 1,000 medical and professional personnel safely evacuated 322 patients and transferred them to 14 other hospitals. On December 27, major clinical units reopened, 59 days after the storm. U.S. Senator Charles Schumer helped secure more than $150 million of federal aid to repair and replace damaged facilities. Nurse Menchu de Luna Sanchez, who devised a plan to safely evacuate 20 at-risk infants from Tisch Hospital's neonatal intensive care unit, was one of the honored guests at President Obama's State of the Union Address on February 12, 2013. Lighting the way with flashlights and iPhones, clinicians carried the infants down eight flights of stairs and transferred them to local hospitals.

In 2021, NYU Langone Health was selected by the National Institutes of Health (NIH) to be the Clinical Science Core of the Researching COVID to Enhance Recovery (RECOVER) Initiative. RECOVER is a project aimed at understanding the long-term effects of COVID-19 to help develop new approaches to diagnosis and treatment. As part of the research, NYU Langone received a parent award of more than $450 million. The institution is charged with leading and integrating the research activities of 35 institutions and 100 researchers nationwide, to which it will make sub-awards. RECOVER is studying adults, children, and electronic health records to examine how many people are affected by COVID in the long term, which treatments contribute to recovery, and why some patients are vulnerable to lingering symptoms while others are not.

== Rankings and recognitions ==
In 2023, NYU Langone Health was awarded accreditation and the Gold Seal of Approval by The Joint Commission. The Joint Commission has also recognized NYU Langone for excellence in perinatal, palliative, and ventricular assist device care.

NYU Langone Health's four hospitals have all earned the Magnet designation for excellence in nursing and quality patient care from the American Nurses Credentialing Center.

NYU Langone Health's Comprehensive Stroke Center is recognized by The Joint Commission and the New York State Department of Health for providing advanced stroke care.

The Kidney Transplant Program at the NYU Langone Transplant Institute is one of the top kidney transplant centers in the U.S. Its one-year survival rate is higher than the national average, according to the Scientific Registry of Transplant Recipients. In 2022 NYU Langone transplanted 335 kidneys - the most of any center in New York State - and was the only high-volume program in the US to achieve top-tier measures in both one-year organ survival and time-to-transplantation. The kidney transplant program also had the lowest mortality rate in New York City among patients on the waitlist for a donor organ, and a 100 percent one-year survival rate for patients receiving new organs from living donors.

The Heart Transplant Program at the NYU Langone Transplant Institute is one of the top heart transplant centers in the U.S. It has the highest patient survival rate in the nation among programs that perform over 20 transplants per year and the highest survival rate in New York State, according to the Scientific Registry of Transplant Recipients. In 2022, NYU Langone transplanted 69 hearts and had the fastest transplant rate in the Northeast. The heart transplant team has performed more than 300 transplants since its inception in January 2018. It has innovated new methods to deliver life-saving heart transplants, such as a protocol for highly sensitized patients and new bridges to transplants for patients in end-stage heart failure.

The Lung Transplant Program at the NYU Langone Transplant Institute is rated the best in the nation, based on its one-year survival (93.45 percent), wait times, survival rate on the waitlist, and volume of transplants, according to the Scientific Registry of Transplant Recipients. In 2022, NYU Langone performed 81 lung transplants. NYU Langone Health has earned a three-star rating, the highest, from the Society of Thoracic Surgeons, for mitral valve replacement and repair, aortic valve repair, and coronary artery bypass.

The Liver Transplant Program at the NYU Langone Transplant Institute is one of the top programs in the US and the #1 program in New York. It has the highest transplant rate in New York with 100% living donor graft survival. In 2024, it performed 127 liver transplants.

The overall survival rate for pediatric cardiac surgery at Hassenfeld Children's Hospital at NYU Langone is 99%, compared with a national rate of 97.36%, according to the Society of Thoracic Surgeons. The pediatric cardiac surgery program has the highest risk-adjusted survival rate of any hospital in New York State, according to the state's Department of Health.

=== U.S. News & World Report ===
In 2026, U.S. News & World Report, named NYU Langone Health best in the nation for neurology and neurosurgery and cardiology, heart and vascular surgery. The institution was also included on the 2026-2027 “Best Hospitals” Honor Roll of the top 20 hospitals in the nation and among the No. 1 hospitals in the New York metro area.

U.S. News & World Report Rankings for NYU Langone Hospitals
Specialty	Rank (In the U.S.)
Cancer	#14
Cardiology, Heart & Vascular Surgery	#1
Diabetes & Endocrinology	#4
Gastroenterology & GI Surgery	#6
Geriatrics	#2
Neurology & Neurosurgery	#1
Obstetrics & Gynecology	#10 (tied)
Orthopedics	#2
Psychiatry	#8 (tied)
Pulmonology & Lung Surgery	#2
Rehabilitation	#6
Rheumatology	#9
Urology	#2
