= Rebecca Rutstein =

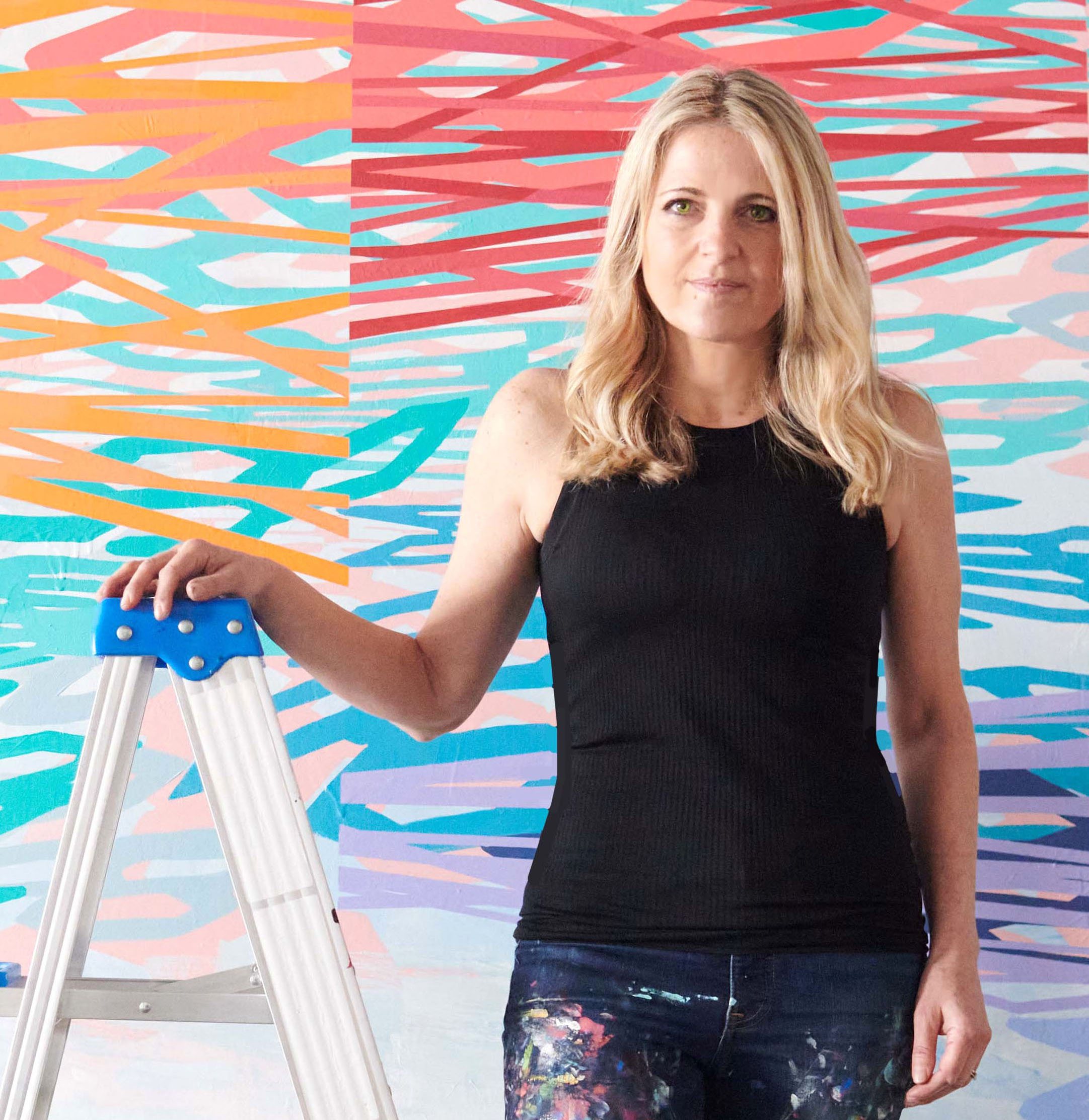
- Rutstein in 2022
- Born: 1971 (age 54–55); Wynnewood, Pennsylvania, U.S.
- Education: Bachelor of Fine Arts, Cornell University; Master of Fine Arts, University of Pennsylvania
- Known for: Public art, painting, sculpture
- Website: https://rebeccarutstein.com

Rebecca Rutstein (born 1971) is an American artist known for her multidisciplinary work and collaborations with oceanographers, ecologists, microbiologists, molecular scientists, and geologists. She is a full-time artist who works in her studio in Philadelphia.

== Early life and education ==
Rutstein was born in 1971 in Wynnewood, Pennsylvania. A graduate of Lower Merion High School, she earned a Bachelor of Fine Arts, graduating Magna Cum Laude, from Cornell University, Ithaca, NY, in 1993. She went on the earn a Master of Fine Arts from the University of Pennsylvania, Philadelphia in 1997.

== Career ==
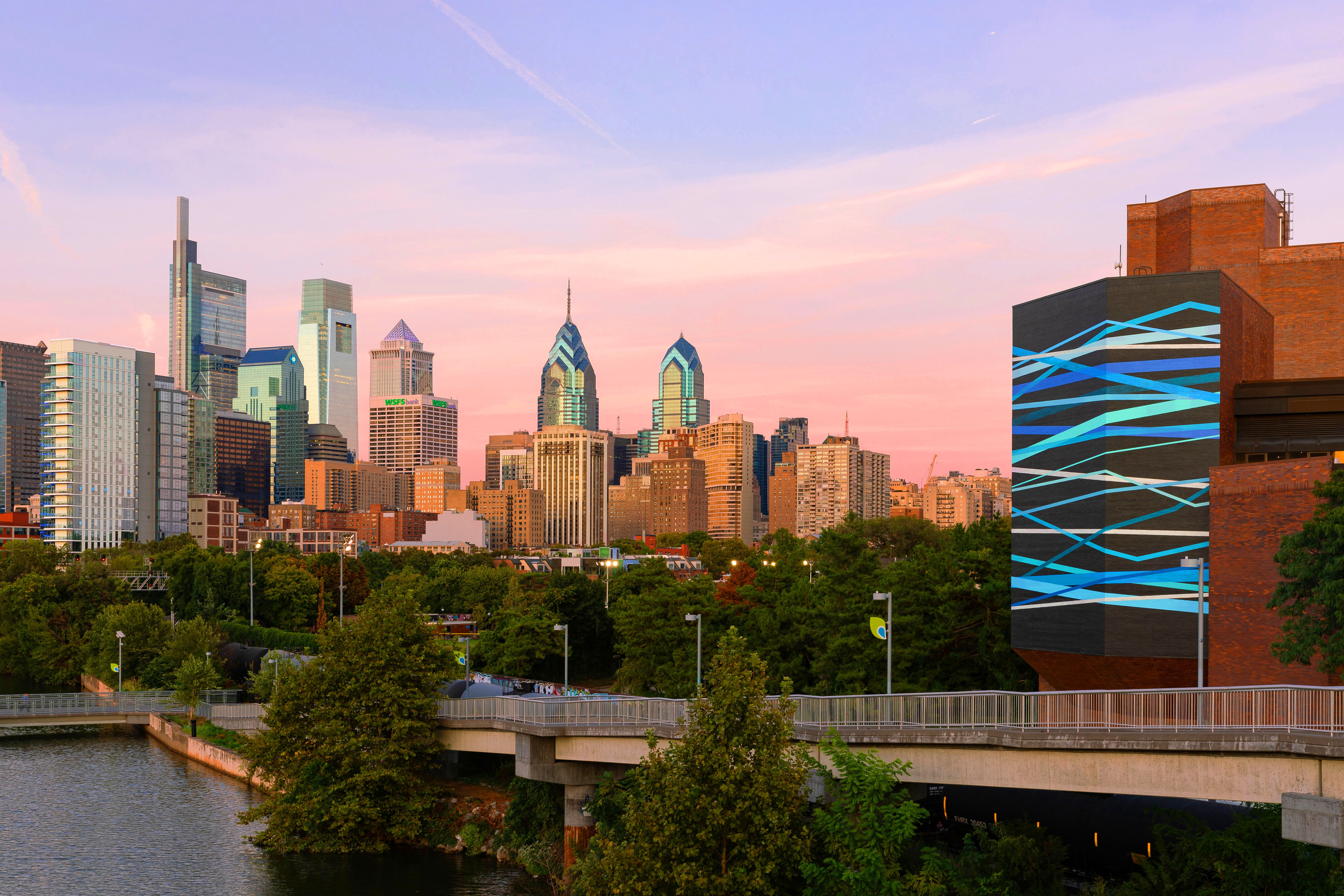
© Rebecca Rutstein, Convergence 2019 City of Philadelphia Mural Arts Program, 27th and South Street. Photo: Steve Weinik

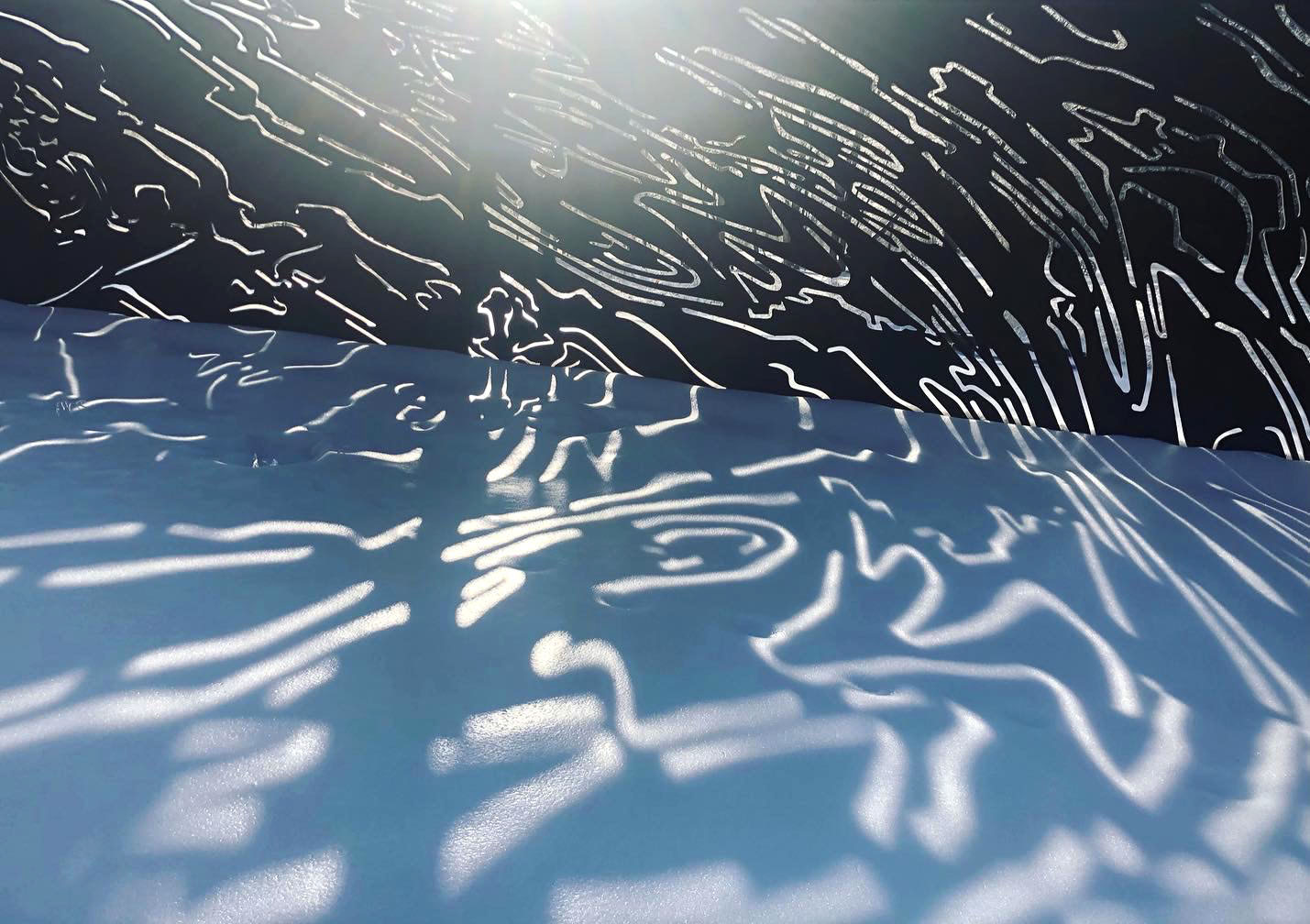
© Rebecca Rutstein, Ridge & Valley, 2020, Bower Sculpture Park & Native Garden, Shermans Dale, PA. Photo: Bill Allis

Since the early 2000s, Rutstein has created painting, sculpture, interactive installation, and public art inspired by the natural world. She has been an artist in residence on eight expeditions at sea, including aboard the R/V Falkor sailing from Vietnam to Guam, the R/V Atlantis in the Guaymas Basin, Mexico and off the coast of Costa Rica, and the R/V Rachel Carson in the Salish Sea, and three deep-sea dives to the ocean floor in the Alvin research submersible. She is a collaborator on The Ocean Memory Project, a transdisciplinary group of researchers exploring ways in which the ocean and its inhabitants are an interconnected system with agency and memory. She has collaborated with oceanographers, ecologists, microbiologists, molecular scientists, and geologists. Scientists with whom she has collaborated include Samantha "Mandy" Joye, Erik Cordes, Chris German, Jody Deming, and Julia Cartwright. Through visual and immersive experiences, her abstract work sheds light on the places, systems, and processes that are often hidden from view. Her goal is to foster a deeper connection with nature, and inspire wonder, empathy, and stewardship in the face of the climate crisis.

Her work can be found in the collections of the Philadelphia Museum of Art, Georgia Museum of Art, National Academy of Sciences, Pennsylvania Academy of the Fine Arts, U.S. Consulate in Thailand, U.S. Department of State, Yale University, University of Washington, University of Alabama, University of New Mexico, Albert Einstein College of Medicine, Johns Hopkins Hospital, Microsoft and AT&T.

== Talks ==
- Podcast with The Ongoing Transformation from Issues in Science and Technology journal
- National Academy of Sciences, May and Sept 2023
- Woods Hole Oceanographic Institution, May 2023
- Women Mind the Water Podcast, April 2023
- Georgetown University, March 2023
- Lehigh University, March 2023
- Montclair State University, Art Forum Series, March 2023
- Delaware County Community College, March 2023
- Artist & Place Podcast, Feb 2023
- University of Alabama, Sept 2022
- Dialogues for Artists in a Changing World, March 2022
- University of Washington, Seattle, WA, Nov 2021
- University of Alabama, Aug – Sept 2021
- Podcast Interview, Live at Radio Kismet, Aug 2021
- NPR/WITF Smart Talk Interview, June 3, 2021
- UC Science Center, Philadelphia, April 2021
- Mural Arts Philadelphia, March 2021
- Podcast Interview, Live at Radio Kismet, Feb 2021
- Stanford University, Laser Talk Series, Stanford, CA, Oct 2020
- Tyler School of Art, Temple University, Philadelphia, PA, April 2020
- St. Joseph’s University, Philadelphia, PA Sept 2019
- Pennsylvania Academy of the Fine Arts, Philadelphia, PA, Sept 2019
- University of Rhode Island, Narragansett, RI, April 2019
- “Technycal – Women in Technology” Podcast with Christiane Paul, Whitney Museum Curator of Digital Art, 2019
- Delta Visiting Chair for Global Understanding, University of Georgia, 2018-19
- Cornell University, Ithaca, NY, Sept 2017

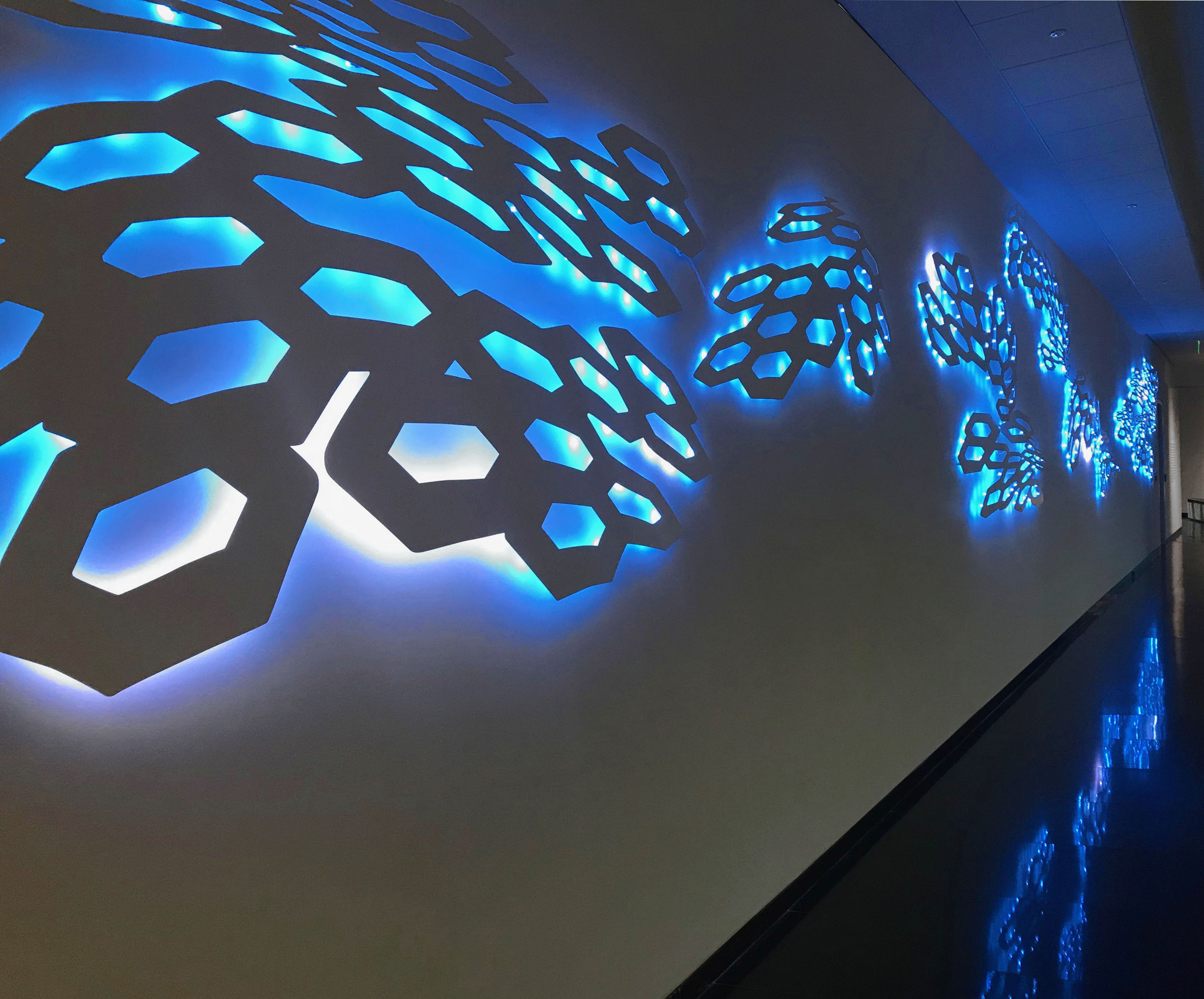
© Rebecca Rutstein, Shimmer, 2018, Permanent Collection Georgia Museum of Art, Athens, GA. Photo: Rebecca Rutstein

== Awards ==
- ·2022-23 National Academies Keck Futures Initiative - Ocean Memory Project Seed Grant
- 2020-21 National Academies Keck Futures Initiative - Ocean Memory Project Seed Grant
- 2018-2019 Delta Visiting Chair for Global Understanding (University of Georgia)
- 2018 MIT Ocean Discovery Fellow, MIT Media Labs, Ocean Exploration Forum
- 2016 Artist at Sea Residency Fellowship, Schmidt Ocean Institute
- 2015 Science Communication Fellowship, Ocean Exploration Trust
- 2009 Independence Foundation Fellowship
- 2007 Pew Professional Development Grant
- 2006 Pennsylvania Council on the Arts Grant
- 2004 Pew Fellowship in the Arts
