= William P. Henszey =

American industrialist and designer of locomotive engines (1832-1909)

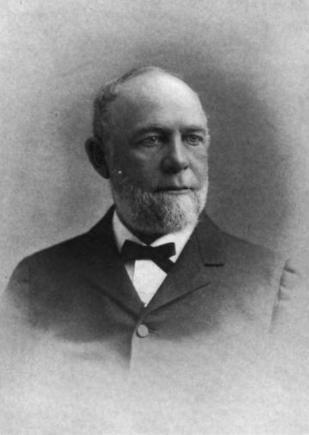
- Born: December 24, 1832; Philadelphia, Pennsylvania
- Died: March 23, 1909 (aged 76); Philadelphia, Pennsylvania
- Occupation: Engineer
- Spouse: Anna B. Hitchcock (m. 1857)

William P. Henszey (December 24, 1832 – March 23, 1909) was an American industrialist, partner and Chief Engineer of the Baldwin Locomotive Works. He was a notable designer of locomotive engines.

== Career at Baldwin ==
Henszey joined Baldwin in 1859 as a draftsman, served as an engine designer and as Chief Engineer, and became a partner in 1870. He eventually owned a 20% share in the firm. Because his ownership share was so large, at his death the other partners decided to reorganize the firm as a joint stock company.

== Childhood and personal life ==
Henszey as born in Philadelphia. He married in 1857 to Anna B. Hitchcock.

== Wynnewood mansion ==
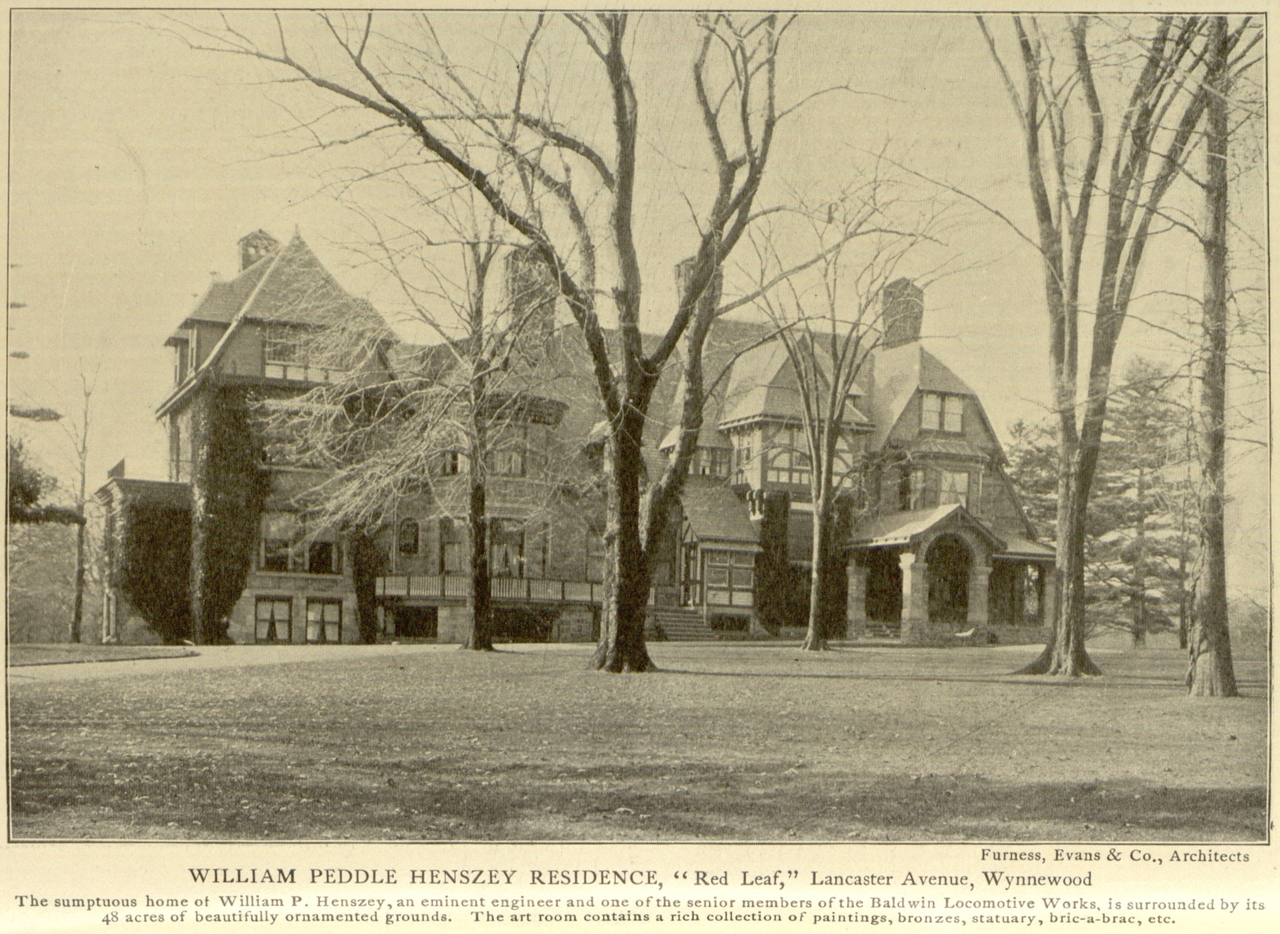
Henszey's home, "Redleaf" at Wynnewood, Pennsylvania

Henszey's mansion, Red Leaf, on 6 acres in Wynnewood, Pennsylvania, designed by Furness & Evans, was his family home from 1881 until his death in 1909. The original manor house burned in the 1890s, and was replaced with a home in Tudor Revival style about 1900. The mansion was converted into apartments in 1946.
