= RV Pelican =

American research vessel

History

United States
- Name: RV Pelican
- Completed: 1985
- Identification: IMO number: 8517009; MMSI number: 367652000; Callsign: WDD6114
- Status: in service

General characteristics
- Tonnage: 514.59 LTSW tons
- Length: 116 ft 4 in (35.46 m) (overall)
- Beam: 26 ft 6 in (8.08 m)
- Draught: 9 ft 6 in (2.90 m) (full load)
- Speed: 9.2 kts
- Range: 3,490 miles
- Notes: ship specifications.; In 2003, the RV Pelican underwent a refit upgrading most of the scientific equipment on board and adding another ten feet to the stern.

RV Pelican was built in 1985 as an oceanographic research vessel and is operated by the Louisiana Universities Marine Consortium (LUMCON). The vessel has four laboratories and can support 16 scientists for periods up to three weeks. In May 2010, it was one of the first scientific vessels to arrive at the site of the Deepwater Horizon oil spill in the Gulf of Mexico to begin the process of characterizing the extent and consequences of the spill.
