= Snubbing =

Type of heavy well intervention performed on oil and gas wells

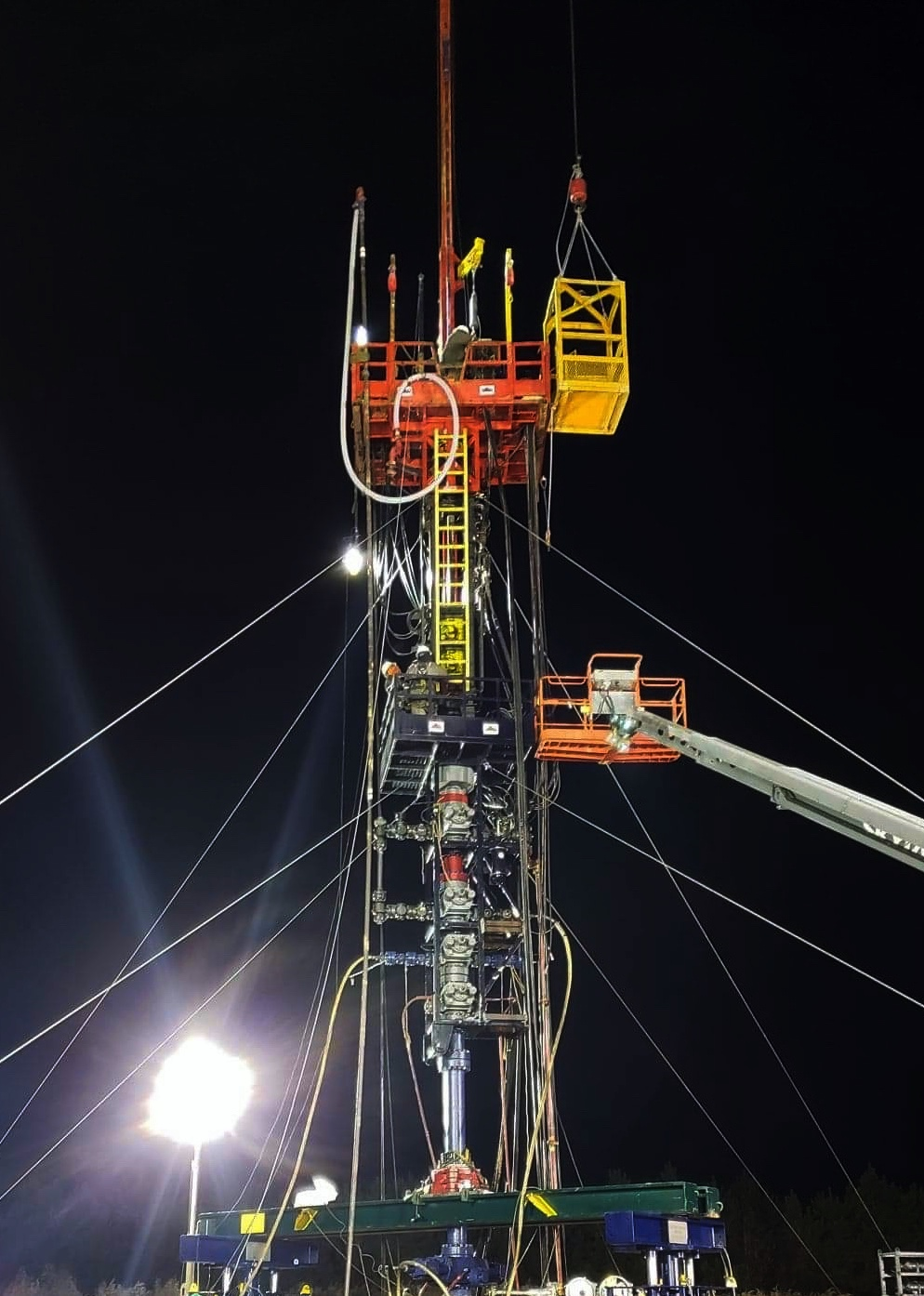
225k Snubbing Unit

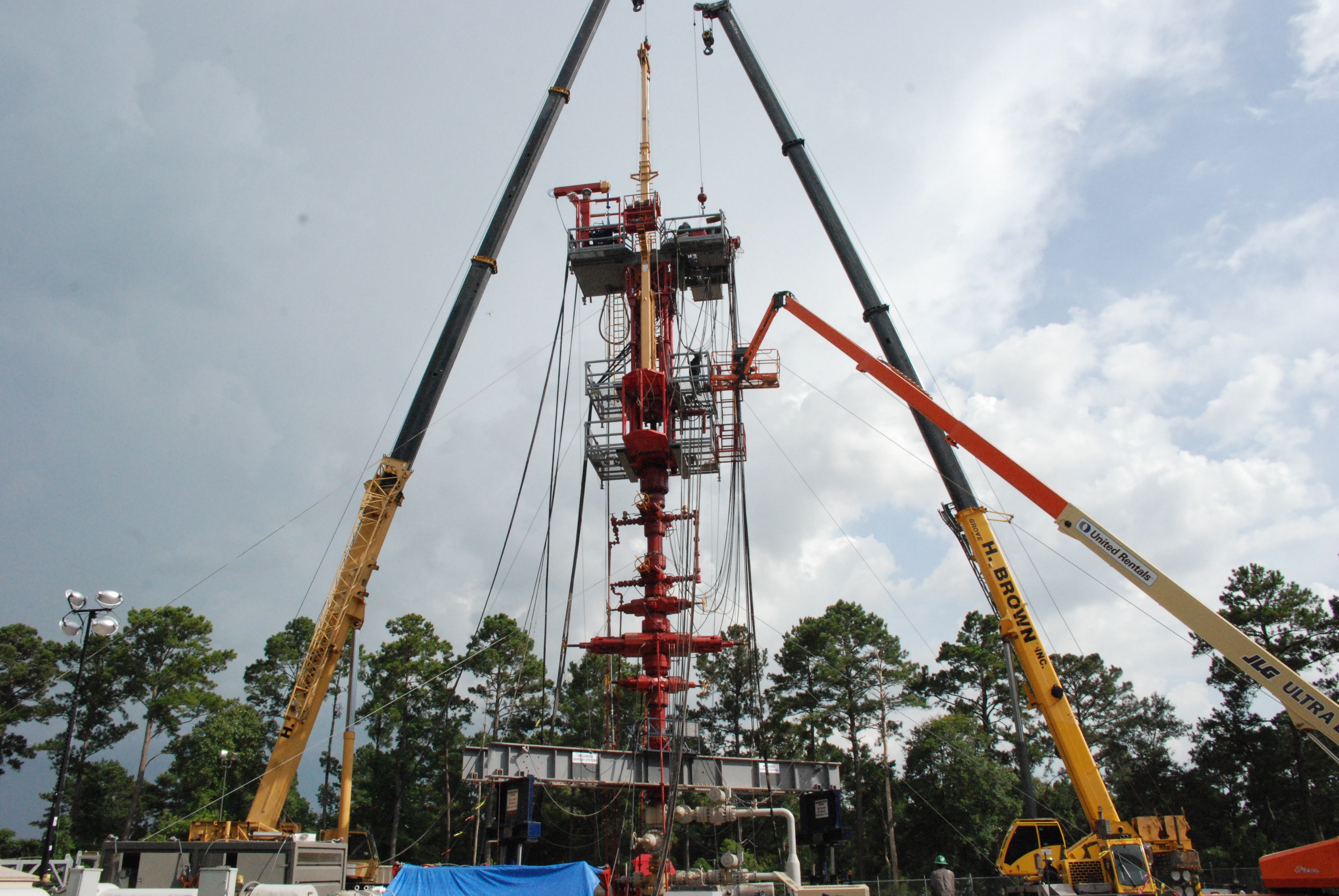
340k units are designed to perform live and dead well interventions on both land and offshore.

Snubbing is a type of heavy well intervention performed on oil and gas wells. It involves running the BHA on a pipe string using a hydraulic workover rig. Unlike wireline or coiled tubing, the pipe is not spooled off a drum but made up and broken up while running in and pulling out, much like conventional drill pipe. Due to the large rigup, it is only used for the most demanding of operations when lighter intervention techniques do not offer the strength and durability. The first snubbing unit was primarily designed to work in well control situations to "snub" drill pipe and or casing into, or out of, a well bore when conventional well killing methods could not be used. Unlike conventional drilling and completions operations, snubbing can be performed with the well still under pressure (not killed). When done so, it is called hydraulic workover. It can also be performed without having to remove the Christmas tree from the wellhead.

== Rigup ==
A snubbing rigup is a very tall structure. It consists of a hydraulically powered snubbing unit, which provides the force on a pipe, above a string of multi-layered pressure control components.

At the top of the snubbing unit is the basket, which serves as the control post for the rigup. Below the basket are the hydraulic jacks, which power the pipe into and out of the hole. It consists of two mechanisms for applying force to the pipe in either direction. Each mechanism consists of travelling and stationary slips. The travelling slips are used to move the pipe, while the stationary slips are used to hold the pipe while the travelling slips are repositioned between strokes.

== Stripping the pipe ==
Unlike coiled tubing or wireline, where the wire or tubing is always the same diameter allowing for a single unmoving primary barrier (stuffing box or stripper), snubbing uses a pipe, which will have an enlarged collar at the connection between the joints. Therefore, the pressure control system must be able to accommodate this variable diameter. The stripping rams accomplish this. The first stage of lowering a collar through the stripping system is to close the lower rams so as to seal off the mechanism above from wellbore pressure. The space between the rams can then be bled off allowing the upper rams to be opened. The collar can then pass through the opened upper rams. Once the collar is in between the rams, the upper rams are closed and pressure is equalised either side of the lower rams. The lower rams are then safely opened and the collar is lowered through the rams.

This process is repeated as successive collars are lowered into the well. When pulling out of hole, this procedure is reversed.

Another popular method of stripping tubulars in/out of a wellbore is with the use of an "Annular" Blow Out Preventer (BOP). An Annular BOP consists of a natural or synthetic rubber element with encased metal reinforcement sections. A hydraulic piston pushes the annular element up into a concaved cap which forces the element diameter to decrease in size. When the element diameter is closed sufficiently it forms a seal around the body of the pipe. The upset or larger diameter section of a pipe connection can be pulled or pushed through a closed annular element without damage and while still maintaining a gas tight seal.

Annular BOPs come in various sizes and pressure ratings and are ideal for lower pressure gas wells. Generally, the maximum pressure for stripping pipe through an annular is equal to 40% of the maximum static pressure rating dry or 60% if the pipe is lubricated as it is being stripped through the annular.

== Heavy-pipe and light-pipe ==
Because snubbing is normally done under pressure, initially, the weight of pipe in wellbore is less than the force due to the wellbore pressure. This is described as light-pipe: downward force is required on the pipe to force it in against resistance. Once a sufficient amount of pipe has been run into the hole, the weight becomes sufficient to overpower the wellbore pressure and the pipe naturally wants to fall in the hole; this is heavy-pipe. At this point, the snubbing mechanism is changed over to the one which provides upward force to hold the pipe and lower it controllably into the well.

When pulling out of hole, upward force is initially used to lift the pipe until the equilibrium point, henceforth downward force is used to prevent wellbore pressure from blowing the light-pipe out of hole.

== Risks ==
The more complex method of pressure control, as compared to coiled tubing and wireline, naturally invites more opportunity for things to go wrong. One such peril was seen in June 2007 on the Shearwater platform. Snubbing was being used to clean out large pebble, which had entered the well through a collapsed liner. While pulling out of hole, one stripping ram was not opened sufficiently and a collar on the pipe string caught on the ram. The excessive force applied to the pipe caused it to break apart, dropping the string below the failure into the well. In the time it took to prepare to fish out the pipe, the pebbles in the process of being circulated out, settled on the pipe, preventing successful fishing.

Although problems such as the one described above can happen they are extremely rare and always avoidable. In the case above, adequate supervision could have prevented this dramatic consequence of operator error by limiting the hydraulic force allowable to be an applied to a level below what was required to part the pipe string.

== Note ==
Not all Snubbing units are large and time-consuming to rig up. In the Canadian oilfield many companies use small "Stand Alone" snubbing units which can be broken down and rigged up in less than 3hrs. These Units consist of 4 segments which can be placed onto 4 separate trucks. These 4 segments consist of the following:

PUMP TRUCK – The Engine of the truck is used to power the pump (which is a series of valves mounted behind the cab).

                  -----> The Pump truck has a trailer which is the MUD TANK

SNUBBING BASKET – Once again the trucks engine is used to power the unit's hydraulics. The Basket lies on the bed of the truck behind the cab.

ACCUMULATOR TRUCK – The Accumulator Unit (or Coomie) is run off a PTO that is connected to the trucks engine. The Coomie Unit also pulls a trailer.

                 ------> The trailer off the Coomie Unit becomes the CATWALK and PIPE RACKS.
                 ------> Mounted on the trailer is the TOOL SHED (or JUNK SKID – a small Shipping container full of tools), and also the LMS
                               (Load Management System), which is used to support the weight of the basket while operational.

PICKER – The Picker, is a truck with a small crane (or Picker) on its back. This Picker is used to Rig up the basket. It also tows a trailer.

                 ------> The trailer for the Picker is the DOGHOUSE. The Doghouse is then split into the TOILET BLOCK and OFFICE, and the GENERATORS
                                (GEN-SETS) which provide electrical power to the rig.

These units are set up in such a fashion so as to be able to cope with the harsh roads and remote locations required in the Canadian winter.

== Units structures and capacities ==
Units varies in strength, there are 95K, 120K, 150K, 170K, 225K, 340K, 460K, 600K The number indicates their working strength in pulling force, and 150K means the unit is capable of pulling maximal 150000 pounds. This is based on the hydraulic force acting on the size of the unit's piston size. Also are there more complex special built unit to find as the CSU 160 a special build rig assist unit, and stand alone units like

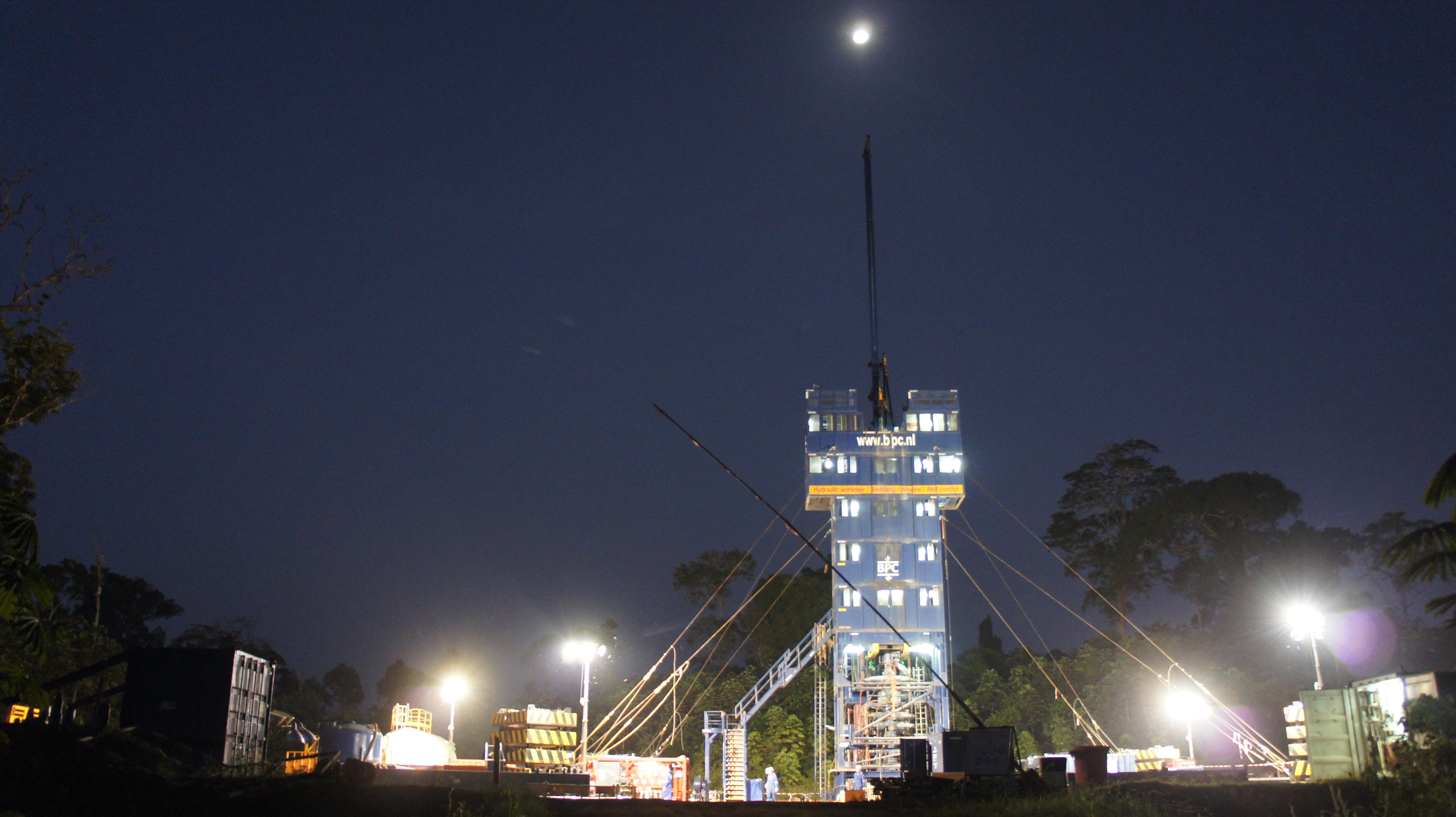
Special build containerized stand alone 600K unit in the jungle.

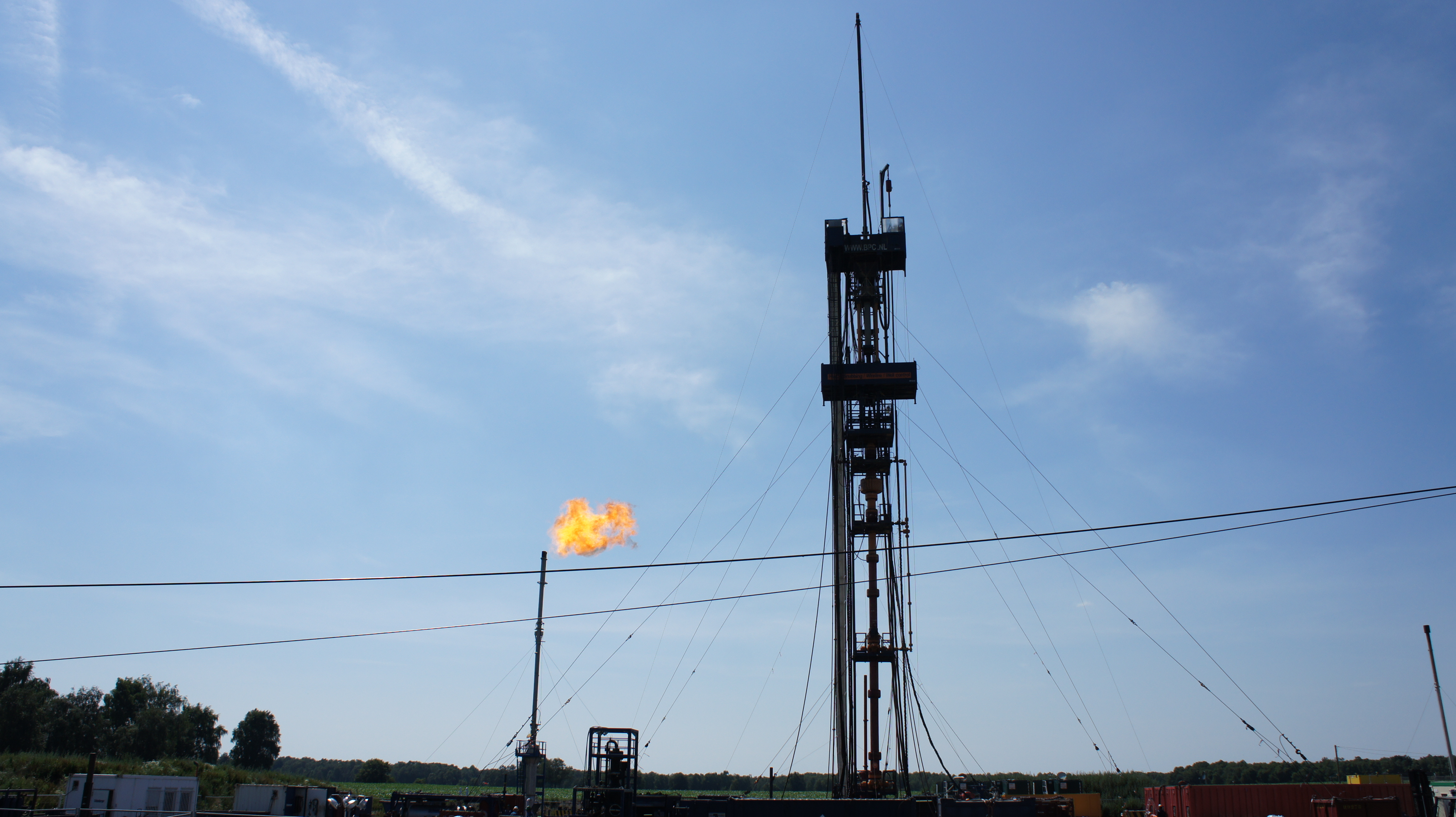
340K unit operational in the field.

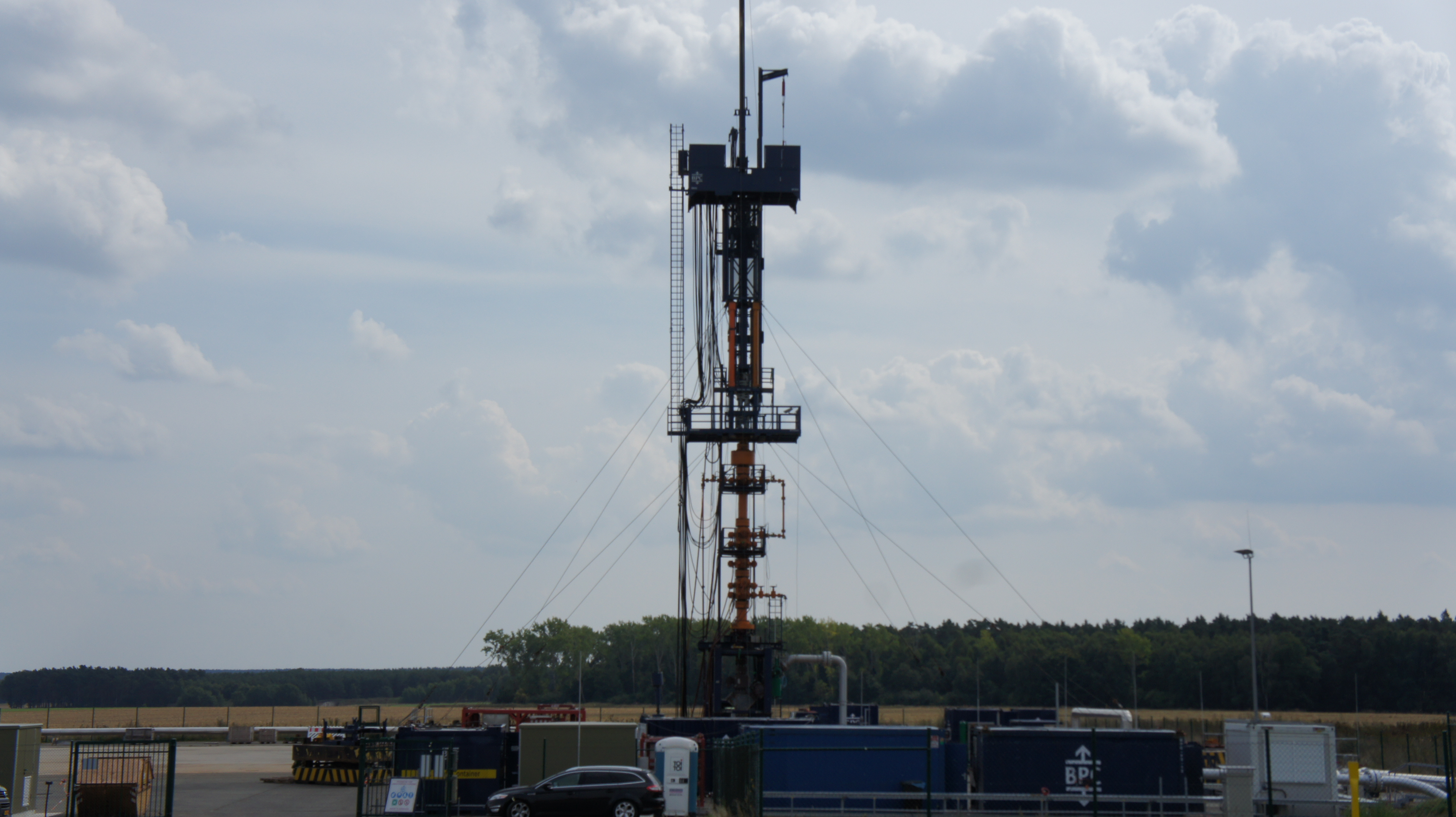
600K unit operational in Germany.

== See also ==
- Oil well
- Drilling rig
- Well intervention
- Blowout preventer
- Completion
