= MAASP =

Maximum Allowable Annulus Surface Pressure is an absolute upper limit for the pressure in the annulus of an oil and gas well as measured at the wellhead.

== Background ==
Preserving well integrity is a vital task for the operators. This includes ensuring that the annuli remain intact. One major threat to annulus integrity is overpressure within the annulus, which could lead to burst or collapse of a casing or damage to the formation below. This will happen first at the shoe of the annulus because the pressure will naturally be higher with the weight of the column of brine. However, annuli usually only have pressure gauges at the wellhead. Therefore, a MAASP is calculated to provide a surface pressure, which will produce the limiting pressure at the shoe.

== Determining a MAASP ==
There are four different ways an annulus may be overpressured: burst of the outside casing, collapse of the inside casing, fracturing of the formation at the shoe, overpressure of the surface equipment. Each of these produces its own limiting pressure at the shoe. The MAASP is taken as the most limiting of these.

The following example is for the 'B' annulus of a gas lifted well, filled with 1.2 sg brine from the shoe at 4070ftTVD (true vertical depth) to surface.

=== Burst of outside casing ===
In this well, the outside casing of the 'B' annulus is 13 3/8 in (340 mm) N80 grade with a weight of 68 lb⋅ft (92 N⋅m)^{−1}. The burst pressure of this casing is 5020 psi. 1.2 sg brine produces a pressure gradient of 0.52 psi.ft^{−1} (see Well kill for the mathematical basics of hydrostatic heads). Therefore, the column of brine produces a pressure difference between top and bottom of 2116 psi. Therefore, the pressure at the wellhead can reach 2904 psi before 5020 psi is reached at the bottom. Therefore, the MAASP for casing burst is 2904 psi.

=== Collapse of inside casing ===
The inside casing is 9 5/8 in (240 mm) L80 47 lb⋅ft (64 N⋅m)^{−1}. The collapse pressure of this casing is 4750 psi. Therefore, pressure at the shoe of the 'B' annulus cannot exceed this. Given a hydrostatic head of 2116 psi, the pressure at the wellhead must not exceed 2634 psi.

=== Fracturing the formation ===
Geologists will have logged fracture pressures of the formation as the well was drilled. This can be used to provide a limiting pressure much as before. If the cement used to cement the casing in place is still intact, fracturing the formation is not a hazard.

=== Surface equipment ===
Wellheads usually have a pressure rating of 5000 psi, 10,000 psi or 15,000 psi. These are far in excess of the other limits.

=== Published MAASP ===
Collapse of the 9 5/8 in (240 mm) casing is clearly the limiting factor so the MAASP will be published as 2634 psi.

== See also ==
- Well integrity
- Annulus (oil well)
