= Production string =

Part of an oil well

The production string is a part of an oil well that is composed of the production tubing and other completion components and serves as the conduit through which the production fluid flows from the oil reservoir to the surface through the wellhead. Its purpose is to both contain the fluids from contaminating the environment or eroding the other well structures, such as the casing.
