= Workover =

Any invasive oil well intervention

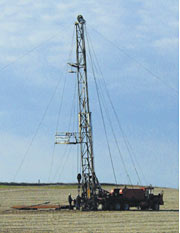
A workover rig.

The term workover is used to refer to any kind of oil well intervention involving invasive techniques, such as wireline, coiled tubing or snubbing. More specifically, a workover refers to the expensive process of pulling and replacing completion or production hardware in order to extend the life of the well.

== Reason to perform a workover ==
Workovers rank among the most complex, difficult and expensive types of well work. They are performed only if the well completion is terminally unsuitable for the job at hand. The production tubing may have become damaged due to operational factors like corrosion to the point where well integrity is threatened. Downhole components such as tubing, retrievable downhole safety valves, or electrical submersible pumps may have malfunctioned, needing replacement.

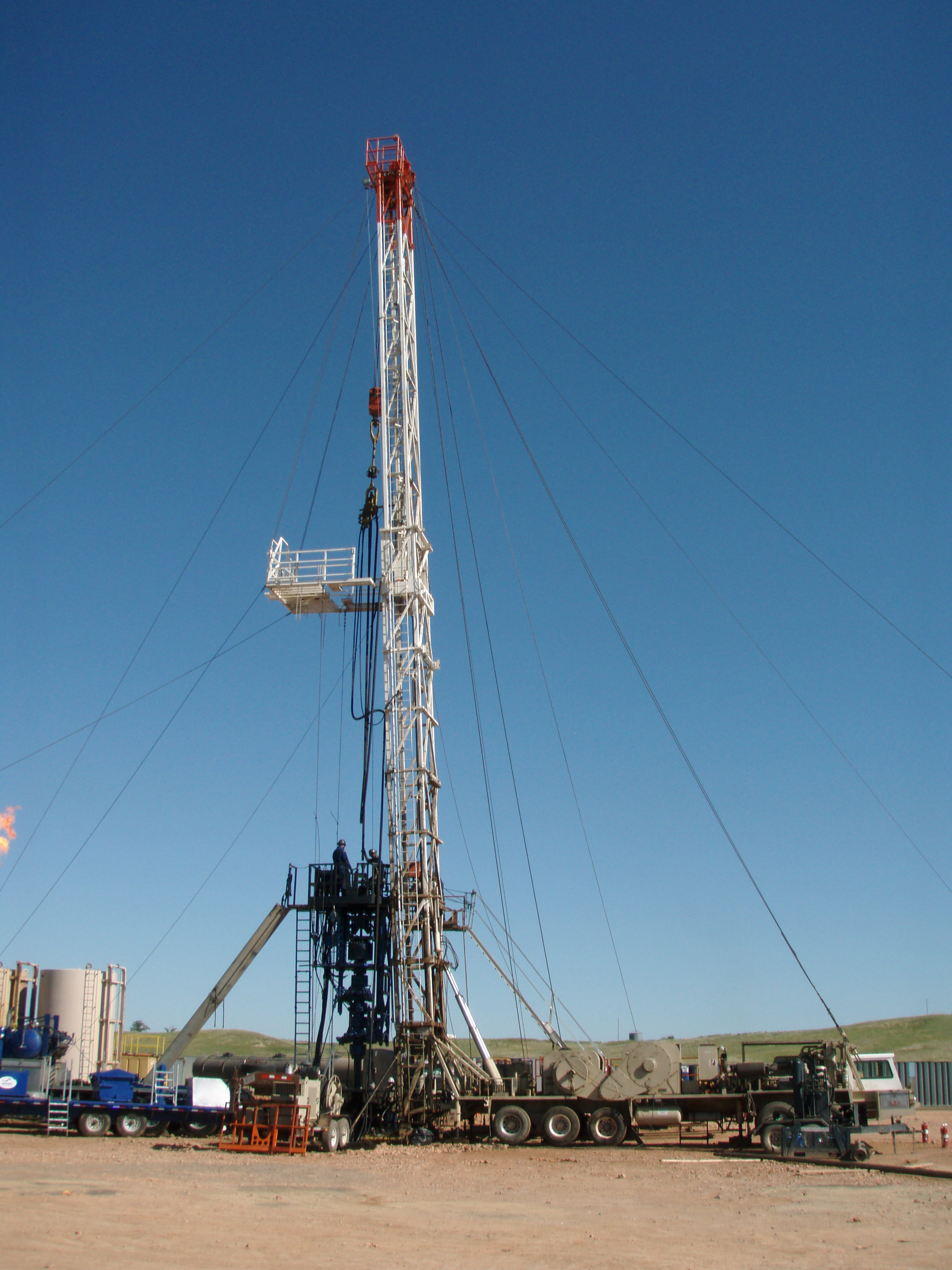
Workover rig doing a snub job

In other circumstances, the reason for a workover may not be that the completion itself is in a bad condition, but that changing reservoir conditions make the former completion unsuitable. For example, a high productivity well may have been completed with 5½" tubing to allow high flow rates because a narrower tubing would have unnecessarily choked the flow, but declining productivity could lead to stable flow being unsupportable through such a wide bore.

== Operation ==
Before any workover, the well must first be killed. Since workovers are long planned in advance, there would be much time to plan the well kill and so the reverse circulation would be common. The intense nature of this operation often requires no less than the capabilities of a drilling rig.

The workover begins by killing the well then removing the wellhead and possibly the flow line, then installing a B.O.P. commonly known as a blowout preventer, then lifting the tubing hanger from the casing head, thus beginning to pull the completion out of the well. The string will almost always be fixed in place by at least one production packer. If the packer is retrievable it can be released easily enough and pulled out with the completion string. If it is permanent, then it is common to cut the tubing just above it and pull out the upper portion of the string. If necessary, the packer and the tubing left in the well can be milled out, though more commonly, the new completion will make use of it by setting a new packer just above it and running new tubing down to the top of the old one.

== Workovers on casing ==
Although less exposed to wellbore fluids, casing strings too have been known to lose integrity. On occasion, it may be deemed economical to pull and replace it. Since casing strings are cemented in place, this is significantly more difficult and expensive than replacing the completion string. If in some instances the casing string cannot be removed from the well, it may be necessary to sidetrack the offending area and recomplete, which is also an expensive process. For all but the most productive well, replacing the casing would never be economical.
