= Casing hanger =

Component of a petroleum wellhead assembly

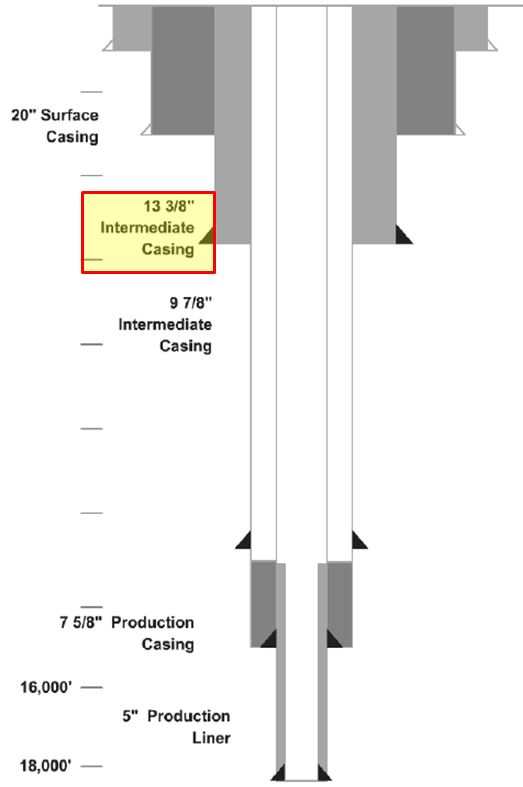
Intermediate Casing

In petroleum production, the casing hanger is that portion of a wellhead assembly which provides support for the casing string when it is lowered into the wellbore. It serves to ensure that the casing is properly located. The hanger is suspended by a casing hanger, which rests on a landing shoulder inside the casing spool. Casing hangers must be designed to take the full weight of the casing, and provide a seal between the casing hanger and the spool. The most common size of casing hanger is 13 3/8 in (340 mm), with over 155,000 such units installed worldwide in 2014 alone.

== Description ==
A casing hanger is the portion of a wellhead assembly which provides support for the casing string when it is lowered into the wellbore. It serves to ensure that the casing is properly located.

== Installation ==
When the casing string has been run into the wellbore it is hung off, or suspended, by a casing hanger, which rests on a landing shoulder inside the casing spool. Casing hangers may also be suspended within the wellhead by means of radial distortion of the wellhead bore: e.g., the "Pos-Grip" method. Casing hangers must be designed to take the full weight of the casing, and provide a seal between the casing hanger and the spool.

The casing hanger is installed to support the individual casing strings in the well. It is the landing base or the casing head. This is usually welded or screwed to the top of the surface casing string. The surface casing serves as a foundation pile for the well which transfers the hanging load to the earth. The casing head is prepared with a bowl into which the slips sit and chuck the casing in place. Most casing heads allow for the pressure readings to be taken on the annulus and provide the means to pump out or into if necessary. The top of the casing string and annulus is usually sealed.

== Use ==
The most common size of casing hanger is 13 3/8 in (340 mm), with over 155,000 such units installed worldwide in 2014 alone. The contraction of the oilfield industry throughout 2015 meant that this figure was reduced somewhat to just under 120,000 units, of which 36,822 were "Pos-Grip" casing hangers.

Intermediate, or protective, casing may be one or more strings of casing. Protective casing is most frequently installed in a well because of the mud weight required to drill deeper in the well. Common sizes of intermediate strings range from 7 in (180 mm) to 10 3/4 in (270 mm) (or larger in deep wells). Each string is cemented in place. Obviously, if several strings of intermediate casing are required in a well, the diameter of the surface hole must be large enough to permit all of the necessary strings. Wells are planned from the bottom up. The purpose of the well determines the diameter of the bottom of the well. If the well is an exploratory wild cat offshore, the bottom of the well must be only large enough to accommodate a logging sonde. If the well is a very productive oil well, a 7 in (180 mm) production tubing might be installed in a larger diameter casing. Gas wells may only require a small 2 7/8 in (73 mm) tubing set in 4 3/4 in (120 mm) casing, so the hole might be relatively small. With rank wildcats in geological basins that have not been explored extensively, the first holes might be large enough to provide for a couple of contingency strings of casing.

== See also ==
- Oil Well
- Extraction of petroleum
