= Coiled tubing umbilical =

Type of piping used in oil and gas wells

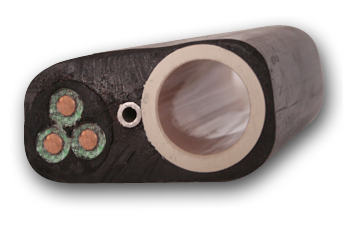
FLATpak coiled tubing umbilical configured for an ESP

Coiled tubing umbilicals are a type of piping used in oil and gas wells.

== Background ==
The piping can be used during interventions. They encapsulate multiple coiled tubing and electrical strings into a single string which can be deployed by one conventional unit. These technologies allow for the deployment of complex pumps on coiled tubing. Multiple strings in a casing may maintain a manageable shape for the tubing and eliminating the danger of ovalization.
