= Casing shoe =

Device used in drilling

In oil drilling and borehole mining, a casing shoe or guide shoe is a bull-nose shaped device which is attached to the bottom of the casing string. A casing hanger, which allows the casing to be suspended from the wellhead, is attached to the top of the casing.
