= Well kill =

Oil well operation

A well kill is a well control operation of placing a column of special fluids of the required density into a well bore to prevent the flow of reservoir fluids without the need for pressure control equipment at the surface. The density of the column's fluids are intended to suppress the pressure of the formation fluids.

The principle of a well kill revolves around the influence of the weight of a fluid column and hence the pressure exerted at the wellbore's bottom. Well kills may be planned in the case of advanced interventions such as workovers, or be contingency operations. The situation calling for a well kill will dictate the method taken. In order to reverse the well kill, the kill fluid must be displaced from the well bore.

== Description ==
A well kill operation places a column of special fluids of the required density into a well bore. This well control technique is done to prevent the flow of reservoir fluids without the need for pressure control equipment at the surface. It works on the principle that the hydrostatic head of the kill fluid or kill mud will be enough to suppress the pressure of the formation fluids.

Not all well kills are deliberate. On occasion, the unintended accumulation of fluids, either from injection of chemicals like methanol from the surface, or from liquids produced from the reservoir, can be enough to kill the well, particularly gas wells, which are notoriously easy to kill.

== Principles ==
The principle of a well kill revolves around the influence of the weight of a fluid column and hence the pressure exerted at the wellbore's bottom.

$$P=hg\rho$$

Where P is the pressure at a specific depth, h, within the column, g is the acceleration of gravity and ρ is the density of the fluid. It is common in the oil industry to use weight density, which is the product of mass density and the acceleration of gravity. This reduces the equation to:

$$P=h\gamma$$

Where γ is the weight density. Weight density may also be described as the pressure gradient because it directly determines how much extra pressure will be added by increasing depth of the column of fluid.

The objective of a well kill operation is to make the pressure at the bottom of the kill fluid equal (or slightly higher) compared to the pressure of the reservoir fluids.

=== Example ===
The pressure of the reservoir fluids at the bottom of the hole is 38 MPa. We have a kill fluid with a weight density of 16 kNm^{−3}. What will need to be the height of the hydrostatic head in order to kill the well?

From the equation:

$$h=\frac{P}{\gamma}$$
$$h=\frac{38\,MPa}{16\,kNm^{-3}}$$
$$h=2375\,m$$

Therefore, a column of 2375 m of this fluid is needed. This refers to the true vertical depth of the column, not the measured depth, which is always larger than true vertical depth due to deviations from vertical.

=== Maths in the oil field ===
In the oil industry, a pure SI system is extremely rare. Weight densities are commonly either given as specific gravity or in pounds per gallon. Simple conversion factors (0.433 for specific gravity and 0.052 for ppg) convert these values to a pressure gradient in psi per foot. Multiplying by the depth in feet gives the pressure at the bottom of the column.

When the well is being drilled in metres as the depth unit, the maths gets more complicated. Since well-kill certification is normally (in the US/UK) done in oil field units (feet for length, inches for diameters, oilfield barrels for volume-pumped, psi for pressures), complex workarounds are often performed to keep the planned calculations in line with local regulations and industry best practices.

== Methods ==
Well kills may be planned in the case of advanced interventions such as workovers, or be contingency operations. The situation calling for a well kill will dictate the method taken.

During all well kills, careful attention must be paid to not exceeding the formation strength at the weakest point of the wellbore (or casing/liner pipes, as appropriate), the "fracture pressure", otherwise fluid will be lost from the wellbore to the formation. Since this lost volume is unknown, it becomes very hard to tell how the kill is proceeding, especially if gas is involved with its large volume change through different parts of the wellbore. Combining a well kill with such a "lost circulation" situation is a serious problem.

Lost circulation situations can, of course, also lead to well kill situations.

=== Reverse circulation ===
This is often the tidiest way of making a planned well kill. It involves pumping kill fluid down the 'A' annulus of the well, through a point of communication between it and the production tubing just above the production packer and up the tubing, displacing the lighter well bore fluids, which are allowed to flow to production.

The point of communication was traditionally a device called a sliding sleeve, or sliding side door, which is a hydraulically operated device, built into the production tubing. During normal operation, it would remain closed sealing off the tubing and the annulus, but for events such as this, it would be opened to allow the free flow of fluids between the two regions. These components have fallen out of favour as they were prone to leaking. Instead, it is now more common to punch a hole in the tubing for circulation kills. Although this permanently damages the tubing, given that most planned well kills are for workovers, this is not an issue, since the tubing is being pulled for replacement anyway.

=== Bullheading ===
This is the most common method of a contingency well kill. If there is a sudden need to kill a well quickly, without the time for rigging up for circulation, the more blunt instrument of bullheading may be used. This involves simply pumping the kill fluid directly down the well bore, forcing the well bore fluids back into the reservoir. This can be effective at achieving the central aim of a well kill; building up a sufficient hydrostatic head in the well bore. However, it can be limited by the burst-pressure capabilities of the tubing or casing, and can risk damaging the reservoir by forcing undesired materials into it. The principal advantage is that it can be done with little advanced planning.

Unlike the designed emergency shutdown features of many systems, bullheading is not considered or intended as a reliable well kill measure. Of a specific note, it still requires a ready access to the well bore, which may not be available in blowout / fire scenarios such as the Deepwater Horizon oil spill.

=== Forward circulation ===
This is similar to reverse circulation, except the kill fluid is pumped into the production tubing and circulated out through the annulus. Though effective, it is not as desirable since it is preferred that the well bore fluids be displaced out to production, rather than the annulus.

=== Lubricate and bleed ===
This is the most time-consuming form of well kill. It involves repeatedly pumping in small quantities of kill mud into the well bore and then bleeding off excess pressure. It works on the principle that the heavier kill mud will sink below the lighter well bore fluids and so bleeding off the pressure will remove the latter, leaving an increasing quantity of kill mud in the well bore with successive steps.

=== Well kills during drilling operations ===
During drilling, pressure control is maintained through the use of precisely concocted drilling fluid, which balances out the pressure at the bottom of the hole. In the event of suddenly encountering a high-pressure pocket, pressure due to drilling fluid may not be able to counter the high formation pressure. Allowing formation fluid to enter into the well-bore. This influx of formation fluid is called kick and then it becomes necessary to kill the well. This is done by pumping kill mud down the drill pipe, where it circulates out the bottom and into the well bore.

== Reversal ==
The intention of a well kill (or the reality of an unintentional well kill) is to stop reservoir fluids flowing to surface. This creates problems when it is desirable to get the well flowing again. In order to reverse the well kill, the kill fluid must be displaced from the well bore. This is done by injecting a gas at high pressure, usually nitrogen, as it is inert and relatively cheap. A gas can be put under sufficient pressure to allow it to push heavy kill fluid, but will then expand and become light once pressure is removed. Thus, having displaced the kill fluid, the gas will not itself kill the well. Low-density ("light") liquids such as diesel fuel, or the base fluid for a (synthetic) oil-based mud can also be used, depending on availability and pressure-management issues for a specific well. The reservoir fluids should be able to flow to surface, displacing the gas.

The cheapest way to do it is similar to bullheading, where the light fluid (nitrogen, or low-density liquid) is pumped in under high pressure to force the kill fluid into the reservoir. This, of course, runs a high risk of causing well damage. The most effective way is to use coiled tubing, pumping the gas/diesel down the coil and circulating out the bottom into the well bore, where it will displace the kill mud to production. (Of course, getting a coiled tubing spread to the location may take weeks of work and logistics.)

== Risks ==
Well control in general is an extremely expensive and dangerous operation. Extensive training, testing, proof of competence, and experience are prerequisites for planning and performing a well kill, even a seemingly simple one. Many people have died through incorrectly performed well kills.

== See also ==
- Blowout preventer
- Coiled tubing
- Oil well
- Top kill
- Well drilling
- Well intervention
