= Annulus (well) =

Ring-shaped void in a well

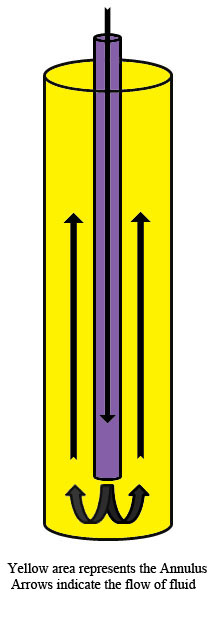
Annulus

The annulus of an oil well or water well is any void between any piping, tubing or casing and the piping, tubing, or casing immediately surrounding it. It is named after the corresponding geometric concept. The presence of an annulus gives the ability to circulate fluid in the well, provided that excess drill cuttings have not accumulated in the annulus, preventing fluid movement and possibly sticking the pipe in the borehole.

For a new well in the process of being drilled, this would be the void between the drill string and the formation being drilled. An easy way to visualise this would be to stand a straw (purple in diagram) straight up in the center of a glass of water. All of the water in between the straw and the sides of the glass would be the annulus (yellow area in diagram), with the straw itself representing the drill string and the sides of the glass representing the formation. While drilling, drilling fluid is pumped down the inside of the drill string and pushes the drill cuttings up the annulus to the surface, where the cuttings are removed from the drilling fluid (drilling mud) by the shale shakers.

In a completed well, there may be many annuli. The 'A' annulus is the void between the production tubing and the smallest casing string. The 'A' annulus can serve a number of crucial tasks, including gas lift and well kills. A normal well will also have a 'B' and frequently a 'C' annulus, between the different casing strings. These annuli do not normally have any connection to well bore fluids, but maintaining pressure in them is important in order to ensure integrity of the casing strings.

Though all annuli in a completed well are expected to be isolated from the production tubing and each other, connections allowing the flow of fluids between them may sometimes occur, due to either intervention or wear and tear. There is said to be "communication" between these connected annuli.

During coiled tubing interventions, the void between the coil and the production tubing can also be considered an annulus and be used for circulation.

== See also ==
- Production tubing
- Casing
- Coiled tubing
- Well kill
- Mud Gas Separator
