= Choke manifold =

In oil and gas production a choke manifold is used to lower the pressure from the well head. It consist of a set of high pressure valves and at least two chokes. These chokes can be fixed or adjustable or a mix of both. The redundancy is needed so that if one choke has to be taken out of service, the flow can be directed through another one. By lowering pressure the retrieved gases can be flared off on site.

== Sources ==
- Schlumberger Oilfield Glossary
