= Production tubing =

Production tubing is a tube used in a wellbore through which production fluids are produced (travel).

== Background ==
Production tubing is run into the drilled well after the casing is run and cemented in place. Production tubing protects wellbore casing from wear, tear, corrosion, and deposition of by-products, such as sand / silt, paraffins, and asphaltenes. Along with other components that constitute the production string, it provides a continuous bore from the production zone to the wellhead through which oil and gas can be produced. It is usually between five and ten centimeters in diameter and is held inside the casing through the use of expandable packing devices. Purpose and design of production tubing is to enable quick, efficient, and safe installation, removal and re-installation.

If there is more than one zone of production in the well, up to four lines of production tubing can be run.

== Production casing ==
Production casing is the final casing string set in a well and usually reaches from the surface to Target Depth (TD). The type of casing used depends upon the different conditions in the well. Commonly, production casing sizes range from 4 1/2 in (110 mm) to as large as 9 5/8 in (240 mm). It is the last string cemented in a well unless a production liner is run. This casing isolates production in the well so that different intervals can be selectively perforated and produced. Usually, the lower zones of production are perforated first. The formations are depleted, those perforations are squeezed with cement and the casing perforated above the original perforations. The production is usually brought to the surface through tubing. Tubing is a smaller diameter pipe that is run inside of the production casing. A packer is usually set at the lower end of the casing to prevent formation fluid from entering the annulus between the tubing and the casing. A packer is an elastomer cylinder that forms a pressure seal between the tubing and the casing. Obviously, good cement placement is required in the production interval. Flow behind the casing from the production zone to a barren formation can prevent production of a large quantity of hydrocarbon.

== Production liner ==
A production liner is a string of casing set across a production interval but does not extend all the way back the surface. Usually there is about a 500 ft (150 m) (more or less) overlap between a liner and the casing string above. The production liner has the same function as a complete string of production casing. A typical casing arrangement in a well is shown in the diagram below. In this case, the surface casing is set to a depth of about 3,000 ft (910 m). Two intermediate strings are set in this well — a 13 3/8 in (340 mm) string and a 9 7/8 in (250 mm) string. A 7 5/8 in (190 mm) production casing is set at a depth of about 15,000 ft (4,600 m) and a 5 in (130 mm) production liner set to TD. Probably, this well required a high mud weight at the bottom of the hole and cementing the 7 5/8 in (190 mm) casing at TD would have resulted in too much pressure and lost circulation. If lost circulation occurs during a primary cement job, there is little guarantee that cement will fill the designated volume behind the casing. This will require the casing be perforated and cement squeezed into the casing/well bore annulus.

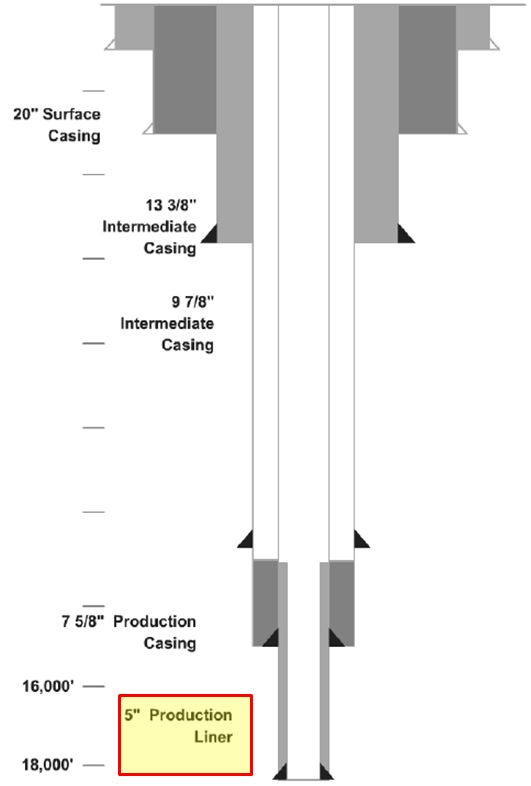
Production Liner

== See also ==
- Oil well
- Casing
- Completion
