= Formation fluid =

Liquids and gases contained in geologic formations

Formation fluid refers to the naturally occurring liquids and gases contained in geologic formations. Fluids introduced during the drilling process are called drilling fluids. Fluids in an oil or gas reservoir are called reservoir fluids. The fluids flowing from the wellhead of an oil or gas well are called production fluids.
