= Coiled tubing =

Long metal pipe used in oil and gas wells

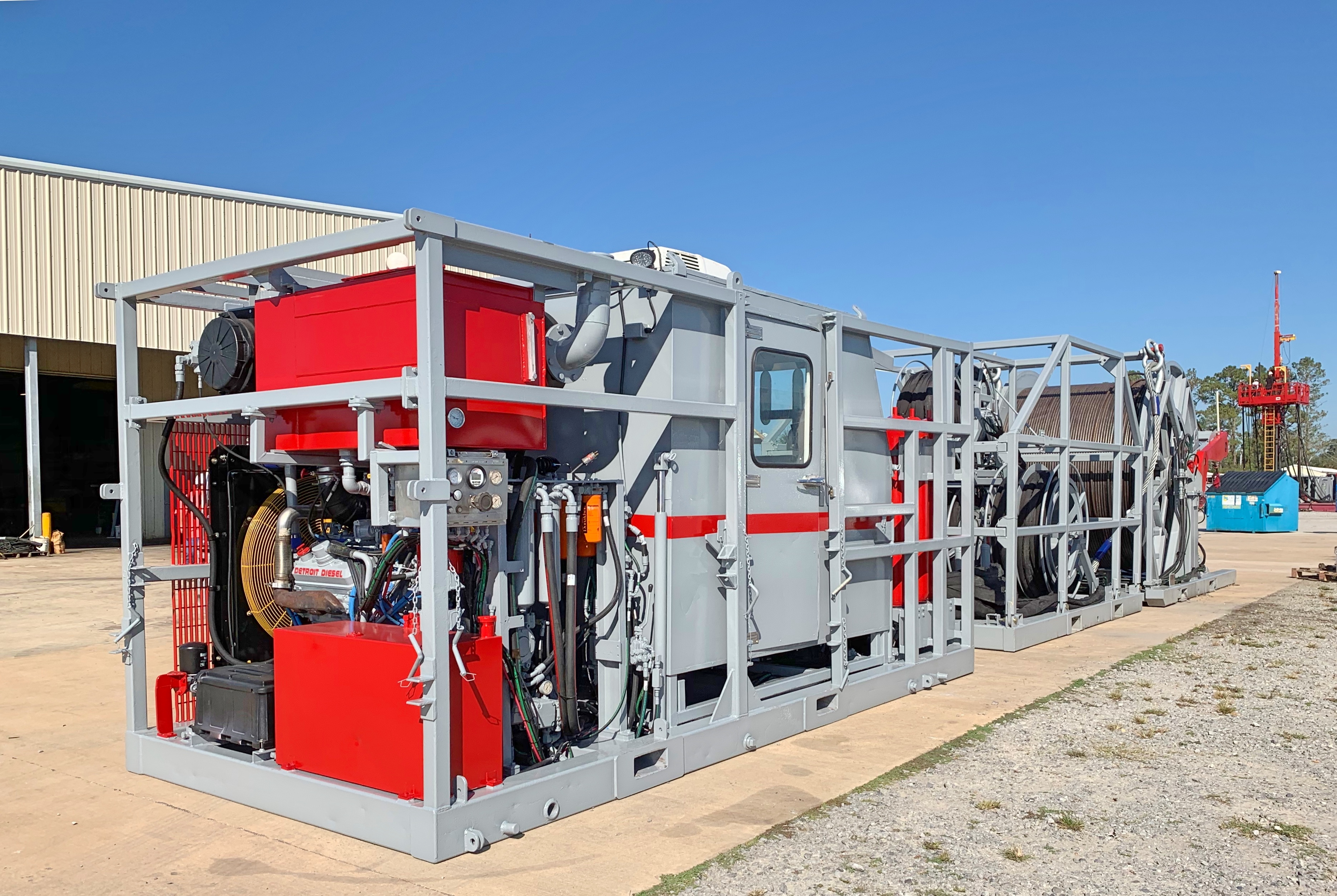
Coiled tubing skid-mount unit.

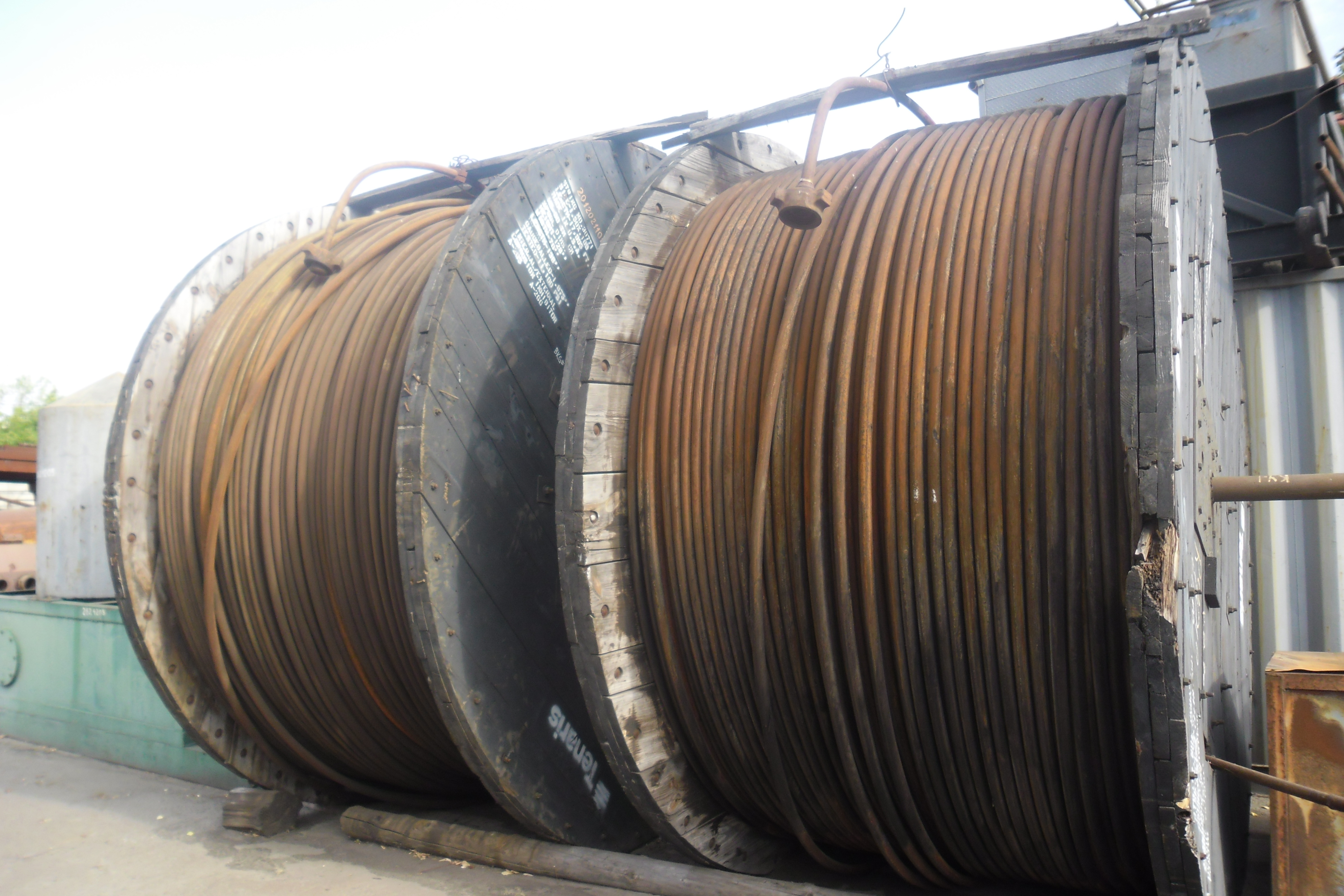
Coiled tubing reels

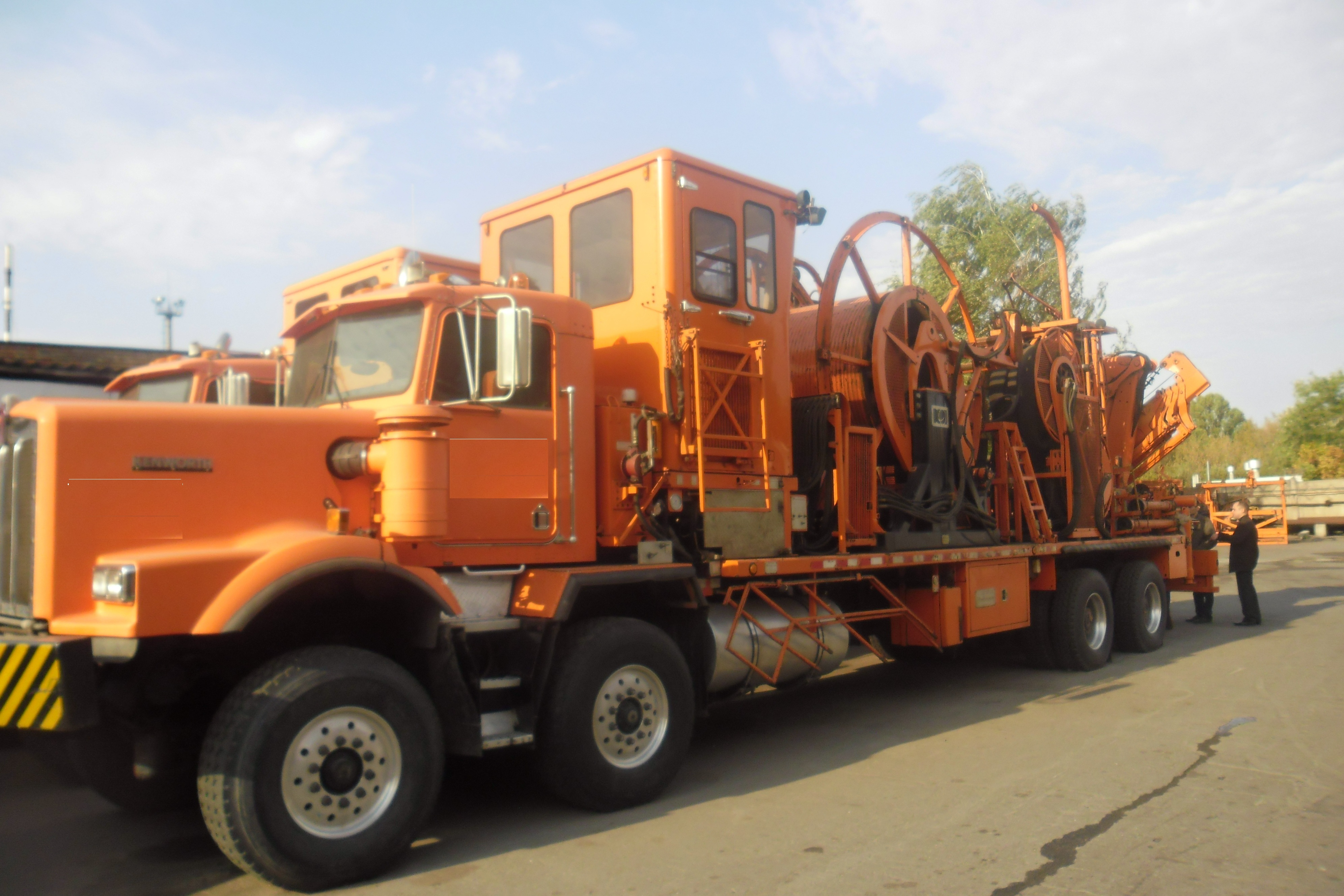
Coiled Tubing Unit (CTU)

In the oil and gas industry, coiled tubing refers to a long metal pipe, normally 1 to 3.25 in (25 to 83 mm) in diameter which is supplied spooled on a large reel. It is used for interventions in oil and gas wells and sometimes as production tubing in depleted gas wells. Coiled tubing is often used to carry out operations similar to wirelining. The main benefits over wireline are the ability to pump chemicals through the coil and the ability to push it into the hole rather than relying on gravity. Pumping can be fairly self-contained, almost a closed system, since the tube is continuous instead of jointed pipe. For offshore operations, the 'footprint' for a coiled tubing operation is generally larger than a wireline spread, which can limit the number of installations where coiled tubing can be performed and make the operation more costly. A coiled tubing operation is normally performed through the drilling derrick on the oil platform, which is used to support the surface equipment, although on platforms with no drilling facilities a self-supporting tower can be used instead. For coiled tubing operations on sub-sea wells a mobile offshore drilling unit (MODU) e.g. semi-submersible, drillship etc. has to be utilized to support all the surface equipment and personnel, whereas wireline can be carried out from a smaller and cheaper intervention vessel. Onshore, they can be run using smaller service rigs, and for light operations a mobile self-contained coiled tubing rig can be used.

The tool string at the bottom of the coil is often called the bottom hole assembly (BHA). It can range from something as simple as a jetting nozzle, for jobs involving pumping chemicals or cement through the coil, to a larger string of logging tools, depending on the operations.

Coiled tubing has also been used as a budget version of work-over operations. It is used to perform open hole drilling and milling operations. Common coiled tubing steels have yield strengths ranging from 55,000 PSI to 120,000 PSI so it can also be used to fracture the reservoir, a process where fluid is pressurized to thousands of psi on a specific point in a well to break the rock apart and allow the flow of product. Coil tubing can perform almost any operation for oil well operations if used correctly.

== Uses ==
=== Circulation clean-out /wash-out ===
The most typical use for coiled tubing is circulation or deliquification. A hydrostatic head (a column of fluid in the well bore) may be inhibiting flow of formation fluids because of its weight (the well is said to have been killed). The safest (though not the cheapest) solution would be to attempt to circulate out the fluid, using a gas, frequently nitrogen (Often called a 'Nitrogen Kick'). By running coiled tubing into the bottom of the hole and pumping in the gas, the kill fluid can be forced out to production. Circulating can also be used to clean out light debris, which may have accumulated in the hole. Coiled tubing umbilicals can convey hydraulic submersible pumps and jet pumps into wells. These pumps allow for inexpensive and noninvasive well cleanouts on low-pressure CBM (coal bed methane) gas wells. These umbilicals can also be run into deviated wells and horizontal laterals.

=== Pumping ===
Pumping through coiled tubing can also be used for dispersing fluids to a specific location in the well such as for cementing perforations or performing chemical washes of downhole components such as sand screens. In the former case, coiled tubing is particularly advantageous compared to simply pumping the cement from surface as allowing it to flow through the entire completion could potentially damage important components, such as the downhole safety valve. Coiled tubing umbilical technologies enable the deployment of complex pumps which require multiple fluid strings on coiled tubing. In many cases, the use of coiled tubing to deploy a complex pump can greatly reduce the cost of deployment by eliminating the number of units on site during the deploy.

=== Coiled Tubing Drilling ===
A relatively modern drilling technique involves using coiled tubing instead of conventional drill pipe. This has the advantage of requiring less effort to trip in and out of the well (the coil can simply be run in and pulled out while drill pipe must be assembled and dismantled joint by joint while tripping in and out).

An additional advantage is that the coiled tubing enters the hole via a stripper, mounted on the injector, which provides a hydraulic seal around the coil. This offers well control capabilities beyond those normally possible with drill pipe, and gives the ability to drill underbalanced.

Instead of rotating the drill bit by using a rotary table or top drive at the surface, it is turned by a downhole MUD MOTOR, powered by the motion of drilling fluid pumped from surface. Drilling which is powered by a mud motor instead of a rotating pipe is generally called slide drilling.

Typically the mud motor will be one component of a Coiled Tubing Drilling bottom hole assembly. The BHA also provides directional survey, gamma, pressure, temperature, and in some cases, petrophysical logs as drilling progresses. The latest generation of advanced Coiled tubing drilling BHAs offer the ability to steer the bit, enabling the well's trajectory to be corrected in response to the measurements taken by the sensors.

=== Logging and perforating ===
These tasks are by default the realm of wireline. Because coiled tubing is rigid, it can be pushed into the well from the surface. This is an advantage over wireline, which depends on the weight of the toolstring to be lowered into the well. For highly deviated and horizontal wells, gravity may be insufficient for wireline logging. Roller stem and tractors can often overcome this disadvantage at greatly reduced cost, particularly on small platforms and subsea wells where coiled tubing would require mobilizing an expensive mobile drilling rig. The use of coiled tubing for these tasks is usually confined to occasions where it is already on site for another purpose, for example a logging run following a chemical wash.

=== Production ===
Coiled tubing is often used as a production string in shallow gas wells that produce some water. The narrow internal diameter results in a much higher velocity than would occur inside conventional tubing or inside the casing. This higher velocity assists in lifting liquids to surface, liquids which might otherwise accumulate in the wellbore and eventually "kill" the well. The coiled tubing may be run inside the casing instead or inside conventional tubing. When coiled tubing is run inside of conventional tubing it is often referred to as a "velocity string" and the space between the outside of the coiled tubing and the inside of the conventional tubing is referred to as the "micro annulus"

. In some cases gas is produced up into the micro annulus. Coiled tubing umbilicals can convey hydraulic submersible pumps, electric submersible pumps and jet pumps into wells for both permanent deliquification schemes and service applications.

== Coiled tubing rigup ==
The main engine of a coiled tubing intervention is the injector head. This component contains the mechanism to push and pull the coil in and out of the hole. An injector head has a curved guide beam on top called a gooseneck which guides the coil into the injector body. Below the injector is the stripper, which contains rubber pack off elements providing a seal around the tubing to isolate the well's pressure.

Below the stripper is the preventer, which provides the ability to cut the coiled tubing pipe and seal the well bore (shear-blind) and hold and seal around the pipe (pipe-slip). Older quad-BOPs have a different ram for each of these functions (blind, shear, pipe, slip). Newer dual-BOPs combine some of these functions together to need just two distinct rams (shear-blind, pipe-slip).

The BOP sits below the riser, which provides the pressurized tunnel down to the top of the Christmas tree. Between the Christmas tree and the riser is the final pressure barrier, the shear-seal BOP, which can cut and seal the pipe.

Worldwide the coiled tubing unit count has increased year on year in the past decade especially in the USA.

== Onshore light coiled tubing unit ==
A coiled tubing unit (CTU) is a self-contained multi-use machine that can do almost anything that a conventional service rig does - with the exception of tripping jointed pipe. There are generally two types in shallow service - Arch and Picker. One uses a vertical elevator with a horsehead on top, and an injector hanging by winch line off it. The Picker units have a picker, and a horsehead bolted directly to the injector.

These types of coiled tubing units have a semi-permanent drum mounted amidships (They are generally tandem drive Class 3 trucks, 40 feet (12 m) long or so)

== Coiled Tubing Parts ==
Custom/generic coiled tubing gripper blocks, skate rollers, arch rollers

== UVG - Universal Gripper Block ==
Most gripper blocks, which hold the tubing while pushing or pulling in / out the well are "size on size" meaning they fit the tubing exactly. There is another gripper block that will accommodate various sizes without changing the gripper block. This is often referred to as a "V Block" which was first developed by Otis Engineering. This provides tubing of varying sizes to be used without changing the gripper blocks. These blocks provide superior gripping with less force (as per patent). The advantage of this is less hydraulic pressure and less stress on skate rollers and backing plates increasing the life of the equipment.

== See also ==
- Oil industry
