= Production fluid =

Production fluid, or well fluid, is the fluid mixture of oil, gas and water in formation fluid that flows to the surface of an oil well from a reservoir. Its consistency and composition varies.

Fluids may be described by a multitude of characteristics including:

- Composition - the quantity of every molecular component within the fluid, eg methane, ethane, propane, i-butane, n-butane, etc
- Water cut - the proportion of the fluid, which is water rather than hydrocarbons.
- API gravity - the oilfield measurement of the weight of the hydrocarbons.
- GOR - Gas to oil ratio describing how many standard cubic feet of gas can be obtained for every stock tank barrel of oil.
- H_{2}S - the concentration of this gas. Fluids with a high concentration of H_{2}S are described as "sour".
- Contaminants such as mercury which may require special material selection and handling
- BS&W - Base sediment and water which settles out during storage

In addition physical properties may include:

- Wellhead flowing pressure
- Wellhead shut-in pressure
- Wellhead flowing temperature

== See also ==
- Produced water
