= Casing string =

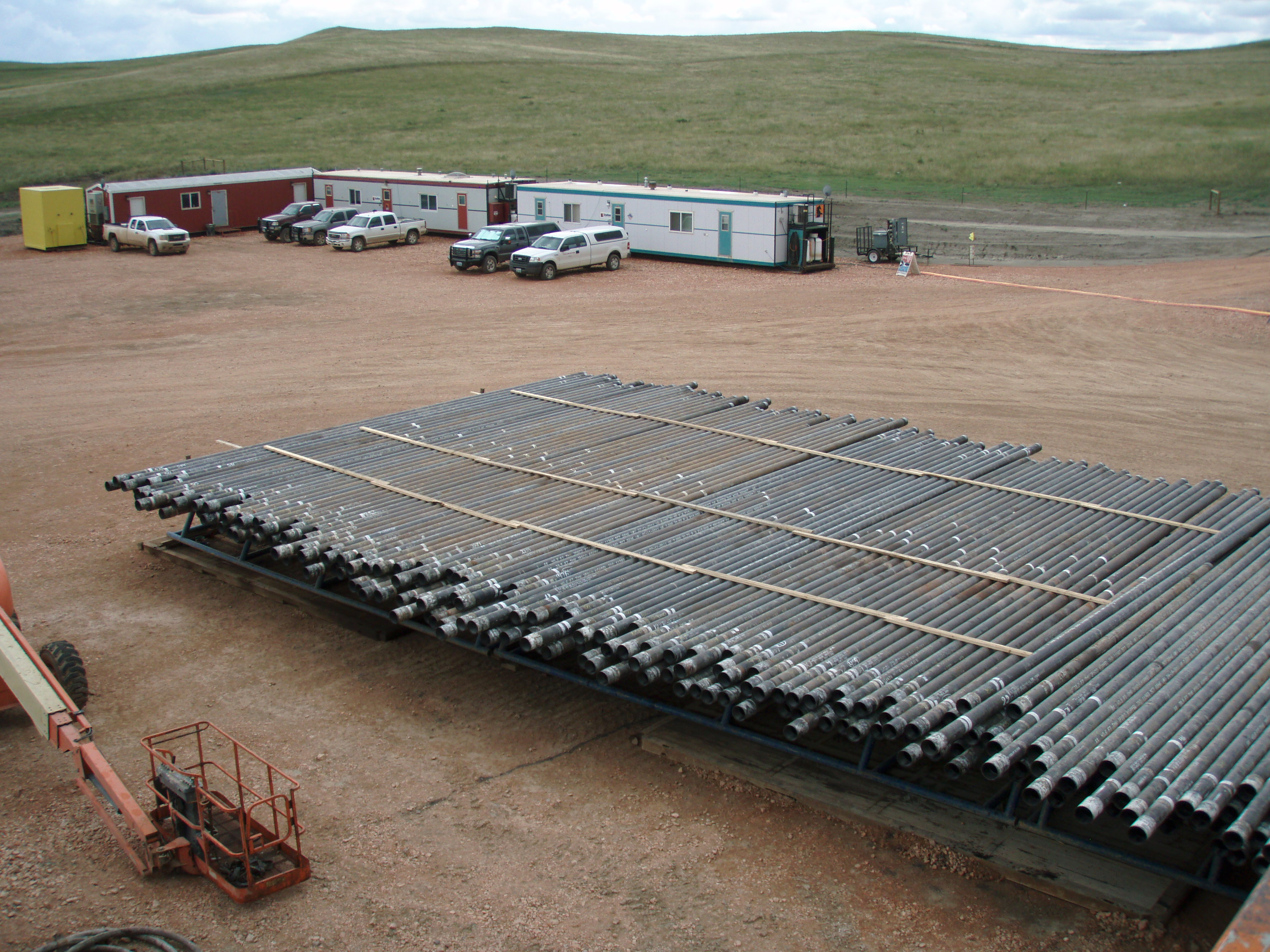
Oil drilling casing string parts

In drilling technology, casing string is a long section of connected oilfield pipes that is lowered into an wellbore and cemented in place. The purpose of the casing pipe is to:

- Prevent the borehole from collapsing.
- Prevent formation fluids from entering the borehole in an uncontrolled way (blow out).
- Prevent fluids in the borehole (such as produced oil or gas, drilling mud, etc.) from entering other formations.

== Background ==
The pipe segments (called "joints") are typically about 40 feet (12 m) in length, with male threads on each end that connect with short lengths of double-female threaded pipe called couplings. (Some specialty casing is manufactured in one piece with a female thread machined directly into one end.)

Specification 5C3 of the American Petroleum Institute standardizes 14 casing sizes from 4.5 inches (11.43 cm) to 20 inches (50.80 cm) outside diameter ("OD"). This and related API documents also set standards for the threaded end finish, the wall thickness (several are available in each size to satisfy various design parameters, and are indirectly specified by standardized nominal weights per linear foot; thicker pipe is obviously heavier), and the strength and certain chemical characteristics of the steel material. Several material strengths—termed "Grades" and ranging from 40,000 pounds per square inch (276 MPa) to 150,000 pounds per square inch (1,034 MPa) minimum yield strength—are available for most combinations of OD and wall thickness to meet various design needs. Finally, the API publications provide performance minimums for longitudinal strength ("joint strength") as well as resistance to internal (bursting) and external (collapsing) pressure differentials.

A typical piece of casing might be described as 9-5/8" 53.5# P-110 LT&C Rg 3: specifying OD, weight per foot (53.5 lbm/ft, thus 0.545-inch wall thickness and 8.535-inch inside diameter), steel strength (110,000 psi yield strength), end finish ("Long Threaded and Coupled"), and approximate length ("Range 3" usually runs between 40 and 42 feet).

Casing is used to protect or isolate formations adjacent to the wellbore. It is generally not possible to drill a well through all of the formations from the surface (or the seabed) to the target depth in one hole-size section. For example, fresh-water-bearing zones (usually found only near the surface) must be protected soon after being penetrated. The well is therefore drilled in sections, with each section of the well sealed off by lining the inside of the borehole with steel pipe (casing), and filling the annular space (or at least the lower portion) between this casing string and the borehole wall with cement. Then drilling commences on the subsequent hole section, necessarily with a smaller bit diameter that will pass through the newly installed casing.

A liner is a casing string that does not extend to the surface, instead being hung from a liner hanger set inside the previous casing string, usually within about 300 feet (91 m) of its bottom. Besides the cost savings, the liner installation allows larger drill pipe or production tubing to be used in the upper portions of the well. (A disadvantage is the occasional difficulty in creating a pressure seal by squeeze cementing the casing-liner overlap zone.)

Depending on the conditions encountered (e.g., zones of differing formation pressure gradients), three or four casing strings may be required to reach the target depth. The cost of the casing can constitute 20-30% of the total cost of the well, and failure can be catastrophic. Therefore, great care must be taken when designing an economic casing program that meets the requirements of the well.
