= Wellhead =

Component at the surface of a well

A wellhead is the component at the surface of an oil or gas well that provides the structural and pressure-containing interface for the drilling and production equipment.

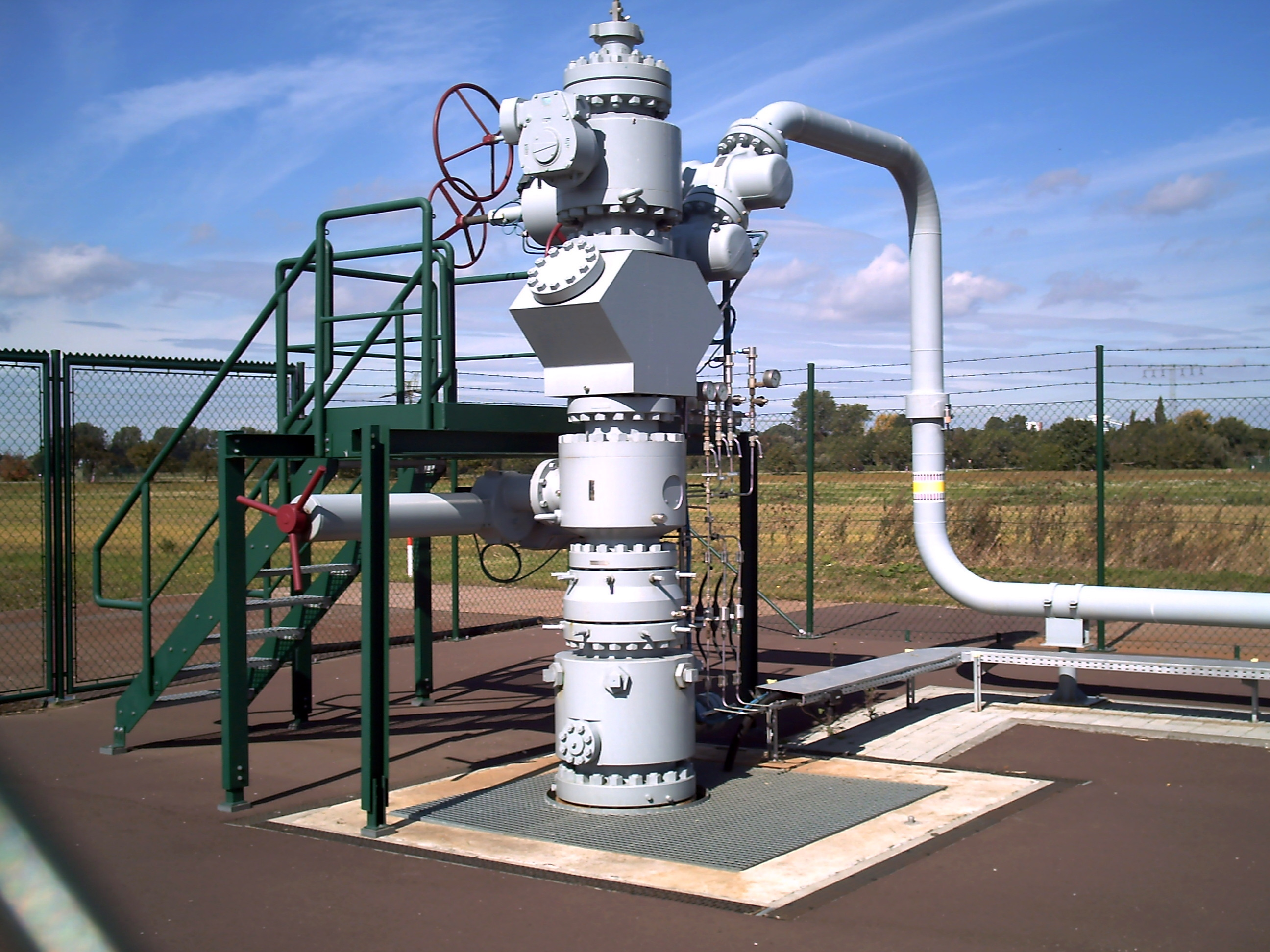
Wellhead gas storage, Etzel Germany

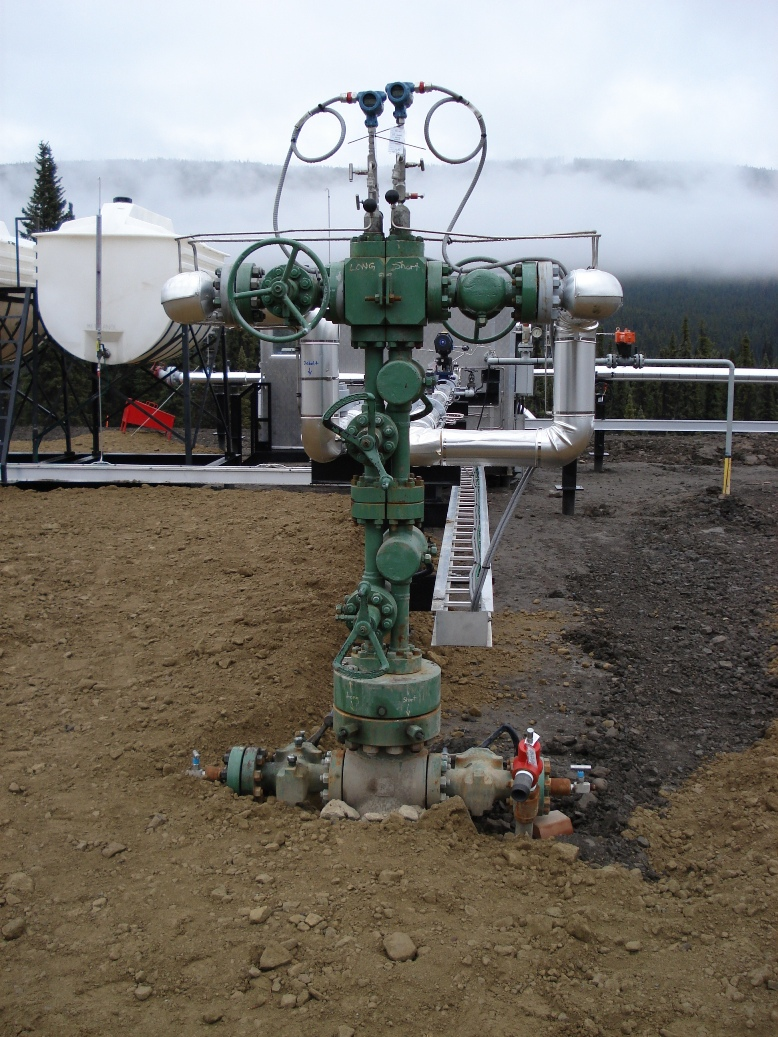
Oil well Christmas tree

The primary purpose of a wellhead is to provide the suspension point and pressure seals for the casing strings that run from the bottom of the hole sections to the surface pressure control equipment.

While drilling the oil well, surface pressure control is provided by a blowout preventer (BOP). If the pressure is not contained during drilling operations by the column of drilling fluid, casings, wellhead, and BOP, a well blowout could occur.

When the well has been drilled, it is completed to provide an interface with the reservoir rock and a tubular conduit for the well fluids. The surface pressure control is provided by a Christmas tree, which is installed on top of the wellhead, with isolation valves and choke equipment to control the flow of well fluids during production.

Wellheads are typically welded onto the first string of casing, which has been cemented in place during drilling operations, to form an integral structure of the well. In exploration wells that are later abandoned, the wellhead may be recovered for refurbishment and re-use.

Offshore, where a wellhead is located on the production platform it is called a surface wellhead, and if located beneath the water then it is referred to as a subsea wellhead or mudline wellhead.

== Components ==
The primary components of a wellhead system are:

- casing head
- casing spools
- casing hangers
- choke manifold
- packoffs (isolation) seals
- test plugs
- mudline suspension systems
- tubing heads
- tubing hangers
- tubing head adapter

== Functions ==
A wellhead serves numerous functions, some of which are:

1. Provide a means of casing suspension (Casing is the permanently installed pipe used to line the well hole for pressure containment and collapse prevention during the drilling phase).
2. Provides a means of tubing suspension (Tubing is removable pipe installed in the well through which well fluids pass).
3. Provides a means of pressure sealing and isolation between casing at surface when many casing strings are used.
4. Provides pressure monitoring and pumping access to annuli between the different casing/tubing strings.
5. Provides a means of attaching a blowout preventer during drilling.
6. Provides a means of attaching a Christmas tree for production operations.
7. Provides a reliable means of well access.
8. Provides a means of attaching a well pump,

== Design specification ==
The oil industry specifications for wellhead systems (materials, dimensions, test procedures and pressure ratings etc.) are :

1. API 6A, 20th Edition, October 2010; Specification for Wellhead and Christmas Tree Equipment
2. ISO 10423:2009 Wellhead and Christmas Tree Equipment

In general well heads are five nominal ratings of wellheads: 2, 3, 5, 10 and 15 (×1000) psi working pressure. They have an operating temperature range of −50 to +250 degrees Fahrenheit. They are used in conjunction with ring type seal gaskets.

In general the yield strength of the materials range from 36000 to 75000 psi.

== See also ==
- Puteal — Water well head
- Pumpjack
- American Petroleum Institute
- Drilling rig (petroleum)
