= Well intervention =

Operation on a deteriorating oil well

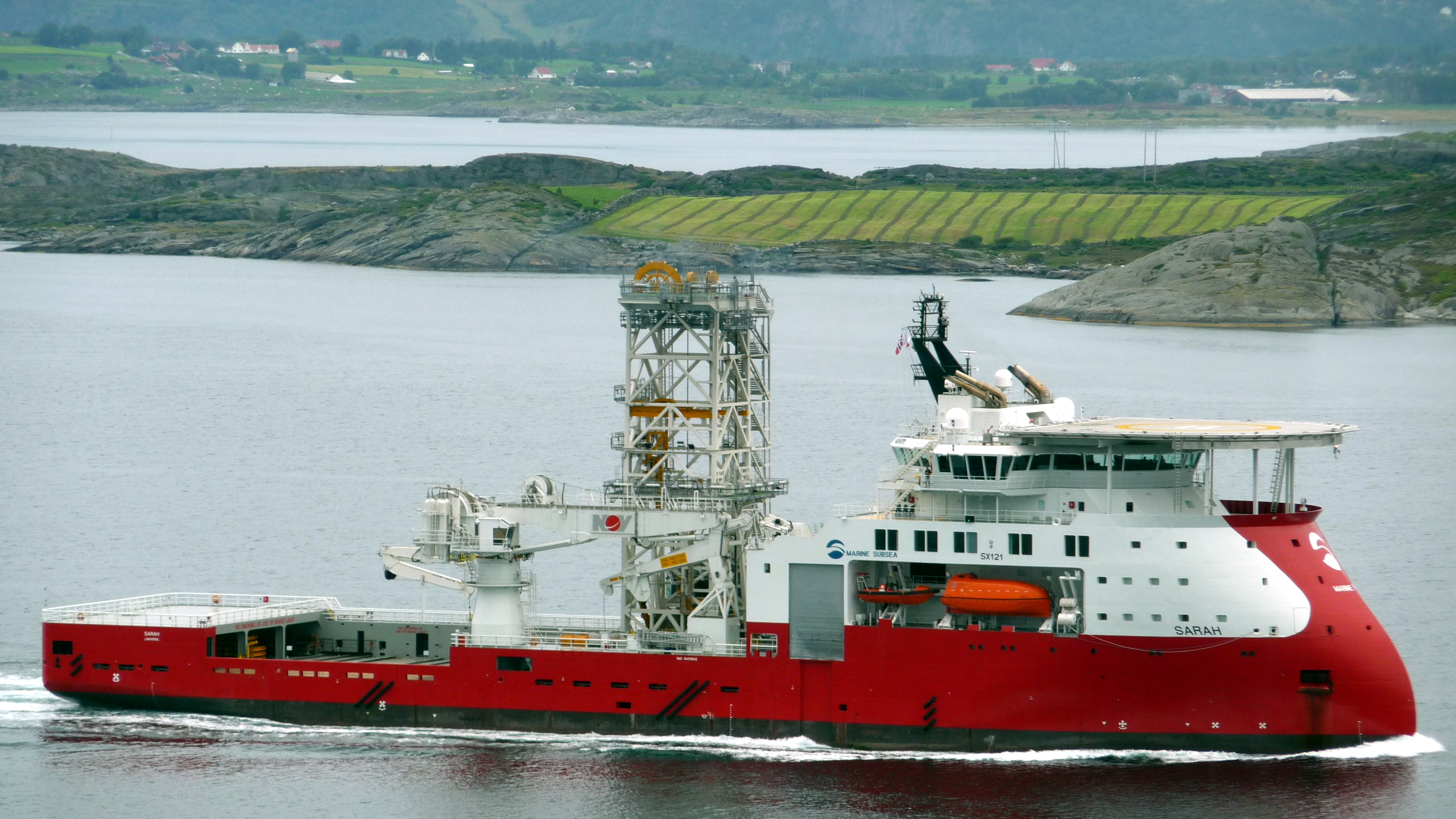
Well intervention vessel Skandi Constructor

A well intervention, or well work, is any operation carried out on an oil or gas well during, or at the end of, its productive life that alters the state of the well or well geometry, provides well diagnostics, or manages the production of the well.

== Types of well intervention ==
=== Pumping ===
Pumping is the simplest form of intervention as it does not involve putting hardware into the well itself. Frequently it simply involves rigging up to the kill wing valve on the Christmas tree and pumping in a fluid determined necessary for the particular well.

=== Wellhead and Christmas tree maintenance ===
The complexity of wellhead and Christmas tree maintenance can vary depending on the condition of the wellheads. Scheduled annual maintenance may simply involve greasing and pressure testing the valve on the hardware. Sometimes the downhole safety valve is pressure tested as well.

=== Slickline ===
Slickline operations may be used for fishing, gauge cutting, setting or removing plugs, deploying or removing wireline retrievable valves and memory logging.

=== Braided line ===
Braided line is more complex than slickline due to the need for a grease injection system in the rigup to ensure the blowout preventer (BOP) can seal around the braided contours of the wire. It also requires an additional shear-seal BOP as a tertiary barrier, as the upper master valve on the Christmas tree can only cut slickline. Braided line includes both the core-less variety used for heaving fishing and electric-line used for well logging and perforating.

=== Coiled tubing ===
Coiled tubing is used when it is desired to pump chemicals directly to the bottom of the well, such as in a circulating operation or a chemical wash. It can also be used for tasks normally done by wireline if the deviation in the well is too severe for gravity to lower the toolstring and circumstances prevent the use of a wireline tractor.

=== Snubbing ===
Snubbing, also known as hydraulic workover, involves forcing a string of pipe into the well against wellbore pressure to perform the required tasks. The rigup is larger than for coiled tubing and the pipe more rigid.

=== Workover ===
In some older wells, changing reservoir conditions or deteriorating condition of the completion may necessitate pulling it out to replace it with a fresh completion.

=== Subsea well intervention ===
Subsea well intervention offers many challenges and requires much planning. The cost of subsea intervention has in the past inhibited the intervention but in the current economic climate it is much more viable. These interventions are commonly executed from light/medium intervention vessels, or mobile offshore drilling units (MODU) for the heavier interventions such as snubbing and workover drilling rigs. Light interventions are generally performed with the well live, and usually involve adjustments of things such as valves; while heavy interventions are generally performed with the well shut down, and may be used to replace parts such as tubing strings or pumps, or to plug and abandon the well.

== See also ==
- Blowout preventer
- List of oilfield service companies
- Oil well
- Petroleum industry
- Well services
- Well stimulation
- Riserless Light Well Intervention
- Helix Energy Solutions Group

== Commercial links ==
- Freemyer Industrial Pressure
