= Roller reamer =

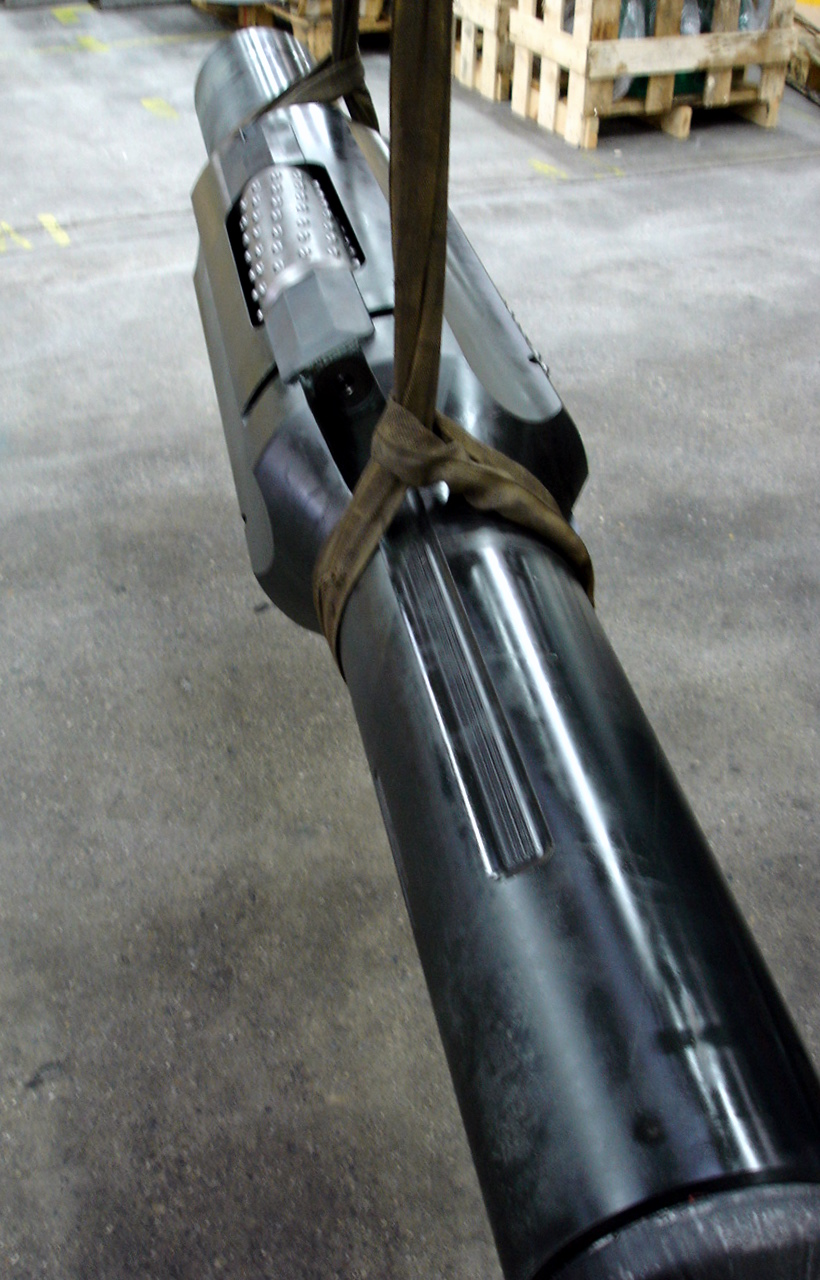
Roller reamer

Roller reamers are employed in boring operations for the oil & gas industry. The main function of roller reamers cut earth formations to enlarge the borehole to the desirable size during well drilling operation, which may be the original size of the drill bit in the case where the drill bit wears to be under-gauged. However, even for new drill bits, roller reamers are employed to cut formations because the bit does not always drill a true bore hole and because of slight lateral shifting which is inherent in the drilling operation, which shifting leaves ledges and other distortions. Additionally, the second function of a roller reamer is to keep the drill stem in the center of the hole at the specific position of placement of the roller-reamer. In providing such a function, a reamer is often referred to as a stabilizer. Maintaining the drill stem centered has many beneficial effects, its primary one being minimizing unintentional hole-angle directional drilling.

== Sizes ==
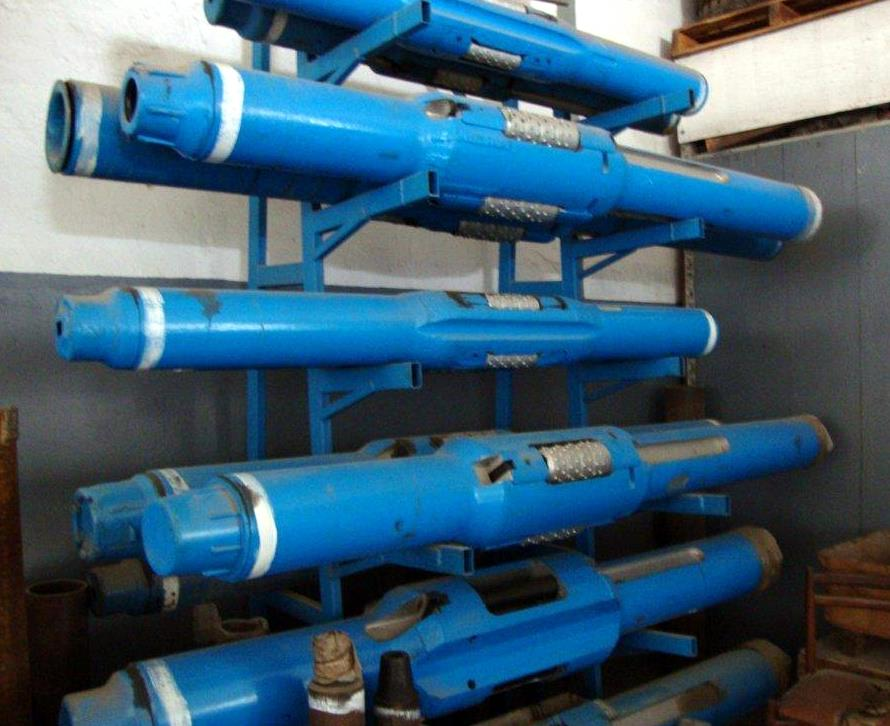
Range of Roller-reamers

Popular hole sizes for well bores range from 5" to 26" in diameter. Size of circulation passage through the center of the body of the reamer typically range from 1 1/2" to 3 1/4" in diameter. The body size on the necks beyond the area where the rollers are mounted typically range from 4 1/8" to 11" in diameter. This latter size will normally be the same size as the drill collar. Body links normally range from 4' to 8'.

== 3-point / 6-point ==
Most roller-reamers have three rollers equally spaced in a single transverse section. Such roller-reamers are referred to as "3-point reamer". When two sets of three rollers spaced apart longitudinally are used, the roller-reamer is called a "6-point reamer". However, large diameter roller-reamers may have more than three rollers in one transverse section.

== See also ==
- Drilling rig
- Driller (oil)
- Drill bit
- Drilling stabilizer
- Hole opener
