= Casing cutter =

Oil drilling equipment

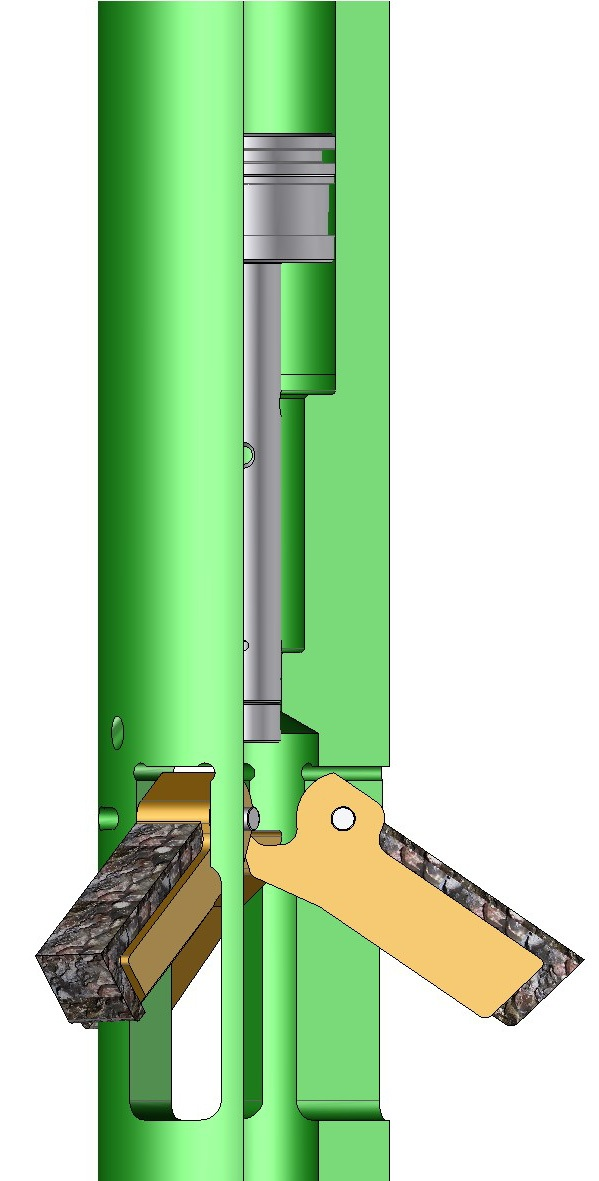
DSI casing cutter details

A casing-cutter is a device used in petroleum industry to cut a complete section of a casing, a liner or all others tubular components in a well bore. This cutting tool is composed by several cutting blades (reinforced with tungsten carbide) pivotally mounted on support body. During cutting operations, the cutting blades are gradually deployed outside the support body by hydraulic pressure or mechanical action.

== See also ==
- Drilling rig
- Driller (oil)
- Drill bit
- Drilling stabilizer
- Hole opener
- Roller reamer
