= Rotary steerable system =

A rotary steerable system (RSS) is a form of drilling technology used in directional drilling. It employs the use of specialized downhole equipment to replace conventional directional tools such as mud motors. They are generally programmed by the measurement while drilling (MWD) engineer or directional driller who transmits commands using surface equipment (typically using either pressure fluctuations in the mud column or variations in the drill string rotation) which the tool responds to, and gradually steers into the desired direction. In other words, a tool designed to drill directionally with continuous rotation from the surface, eliminating the need to "slide" a mud motor.

The first known patent application is from Christopher G. Cross in 1873 for "Drills for Boring Artesian Wells", followed in 1884 by the brothers Morris and Clarence Baker for a "Machine for Operating Drills"

The methods used to direct the well path fall into two broad categories, these being “push-the-bit” or “point-the-bit”. Push-the-bit tools use pads on the outside of the tool which press against the well bore thereby causing the bit to press on the opposite side causing a direction change. Point-the-bit technologies cause the direction of the bit to change relative to the rest of the tool by bending the main shaft running through it. The latter require some kind of non-rotating housing or reference housing in order to create this deflection within the shaft.

The advantages of this technology are many for both main groups of users: geoscientists and drillers. Continuous rotation of the drill string allows for improved transportation of drilled cuttings to the surface resulting in better hydraulic performance, better weight transfer for the same reason allows a much longer, more complex bore to be drilled, and reduced well bore tortuosity due to utilizing a more steady steering model. The well geometry therefore is less aggressive and the wellbore (wall of the well) is smoother than those drilled with a motor. This last benefit concerns geoscientists, because better measurements of the properties of the formation can be obtained, and the drillers, because the well casing or production string can be more easily run to the bottom of the hole.

Due to the relative high cost of this technology limited inroads to the lower end of the directional drilling marketplace have been achieved. As a result this sector of the marketplace is still dominated to a large extent by traditional motor steerable BHA technology. A number of entrepreneurs have made attempts to develop tools aimed at this market (Rotary Steerable Tools BVI, Terravici and Kinetic Upstream Technologies for example) however the impact made has thus far been limited.

== See also ==
- Directional boring
