= Hole opener =

Device used to enlarge the borehole during a well drilling operation

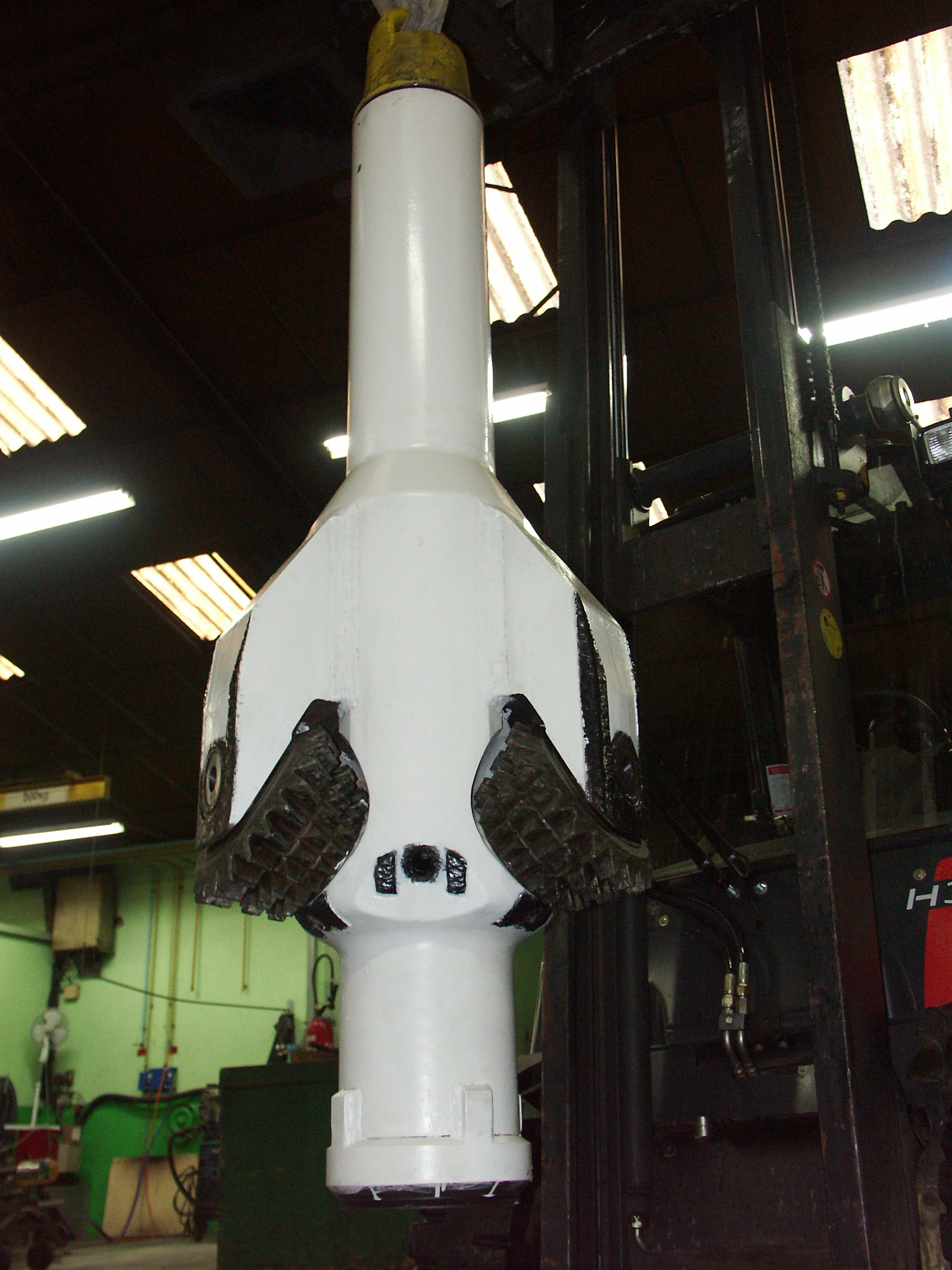
Heavy-duty roller cones hole opener used for offshore drilling

A hole opener is a device used to enlarge the borehole during a well drilling operation. It can be positioned either above the drill bit or above a pilot run inside the existing borehole. Usages range from hydrocarbon drilling operations to water drilling or horizontal drilling. Hole openers are also used when a hole must be logged, since logging tools generally cannot handle holes larger than 17 and a half inches in diameter.

Hole opener arms have to sustain heavy loads during operations and are generally made of high-grade alloy steel, welded onto a solid alloy steel body. Some designs feature replaceable arms, allowing for size changes but decreasing overall robustness. Numerous designs exist, in sizes varying from a couple of inches to above 50". They can have rolling cutters or drag blades, and can be used for either direct or reverse circulation applications.

== See also ==
- Casing cutter
- Drilling rig
- Driller (oil)
- Drag bit
- Drill bit
- Drilling stabilizer
