= Underground pneumatic boring =

Underground pneumatic boring is a trenchless method of installing underground utilities.

The process creates an open-air chamber, referred to as a borehole. The borehole is then used to run utilities.

== Uses ==
Underground pneumatic drills can be used in the installation of public utilities like power lines, gas lines, phone cables, and cable television. It can also be used to install residential lawn irrigation systems. Boring is especially useful when it is difficult or cost-prohibitive to plow or trench.

Underground pneumatic boring can be a low-cost alternative to directional boring.

== Process ==
A piercing tool uses compressed air to bore through the ground. Manufacturers have proprietary standards and control mechanisms. Compressed air is run to the piercing tool through a pneumatic hose. Additionally an oiler attachment is used to send oil along with the compressed air, similar to a jackhammer.

Inside the piercing tool is a piston. A valve controls airflow into the piston chamber, forcing the piston and piercing tool forward. The valve then shuts, and the piston retreats. The valve reopens, and the cycle repeats. The friction between the tool and the earth keeps the tool from sliding back. Tool speed is controlled by manipulating the air supply to the tool. This air supply valve is outside the tool and remains accessible to the operator. As the tool pounds through the ground, it compresses the soil. This compaction maintains the same diameter as the tool and leaves the borehole through which the product is passed.

== Boring ==
The purpose of the drill is to create a tunnel under surface obstructions. First, the operator surveys the area and the obstacle (road, sidewalk, driveway). Utility locators must supervise any underground work, and the path most clear of utilities is chosen to send the tool through. The first hole is dug on one side of the obstacle. This hole must be large enough to fit the tool and allow the operator to aim it. The hole also must be deep enough so that, as the tool compacts the ground, the surface remains undisturbed. The depth of the starting bore pit depends on the type of soil being worked in and how well it compacts. The operator aims the tool to the desired exit point and allows it to perform its function, creating a borehole under the ground without disturbing the surface. The tool is tracked by the operator, who feels the tool pounding and can approximate its location underground. The operator also monitors the surface to ensure it remains undisturbed. As the tool nears the exit point, it is slowed down, and an exit pit is dug to locate both the tool and the bore. As the tool enters the exit pit, the operator chooses to either dig up the tool to retrieve it or reverse it back into the first bore pit for retrieval. Now, between the two pits, there is a completed bore under the obstacle which can be used to run the product.

== Disadvantages ==
Pneumatic drill tools do have drawbacks which can cause difficulties completing the bore. First, the distance of the drill is limited by the length of the hose that supplies the tool with air. Also, the tool is not steerable. Once it has exited the bore pit, the operator no longer has control over it. The tool can be deflected by rocks and soil density to a path the operator had not intended. If this deflection is in the direction of the surface, the tool can cause damage to the obstacle being bored. One more drawback is that the tool can dive to an unrecoverable depth. If it is deflected side to side the tool could also run into other utilities. These hazards make it important for the operator to maintain close observation of the tool. The type of ground on which drill works can also lead to problems. If the soil is too loose, the tool cannot compact the soil, stalling it out or leaving no borehole. If the soil is rocky the tool may be deflected or fail to pound forward due to its inability to break the rock. These drawbacks can be overcome by directional boring or straight-line horizontal underground boring machines that use either wet (slick boring, slurry boring) or dry (auger boring, jack and bore) methods.

== See also ==
- Ditch Witch
- Vermeer Company
