= Flame jet drill =

Technology for rock driling

A flame jet drill is a type of drilling equipment whereby there is no contact with the drilling surface, therefore the drill never wears down.

The tool expels an ultra hot hydrogen flame (~4000 °C) which causes small inconsistencies in the rock to fracture and fly away and thus "drill" surface.

Another prototype drill called a Hydro Jet Drill is able to work in hot damp conditions by superheating water and spraying the rock with the fluid.

The devices were featured in a National Geographic documentary "MegaStructures: Deep Earth Drillers" about geothermal energy.
