= Drilling stabilizer =

Part of a borehole drill string assembly

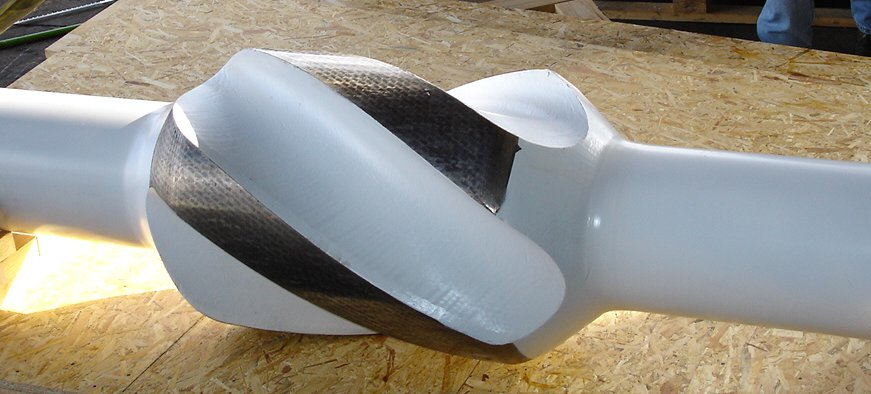
Integral drilling stabilizer with tungsten carbide bricks (TCB) hardfacing

A drilling stabilizer is a piece of downhole equipment used in the bottom hole assembly (BHA) of a drill string. It mechanically stabilizes the BHA in the borehole in order to avoid unintentional sidetracking, vibrations, and ensure the quality of the hole being drilled.

It is composed of a hollow cylindrical body and stabilizing blades, both made of high-strength steel. The blades can be either straight or spiralled, and are hardfaced for wear resistance.

Several types of drilling stabilizers are used in the oilfield today. While integral stabilizers (fully machined out of a single piece of steel) tend to be the norm, other types can be used, such as :

- Replaceable sleeve stabilizer, where the blades are located on a sleeve, which is then screwed on the body. This type can be economical when no repair facilities are available close to the well being drilled and air freight has to be used.
- Welded blades stabilizer, where blades are welded onto the body. This type is usually not advised on oil wells due to the risks of losing blades, but is regularly used when drilling water wells or on low-cost oilfields.

Usually 2 to 3 stabilizers are fitted into the BHA, including one just above the drill bit (near-bit stabilizer) and one or two among the drill collars (string stabilizers).

== See also ==
- Drilling rig
- Driller (oil)
- Drag bit
- Drill Bit
- Hole opener
