= International Drillers =

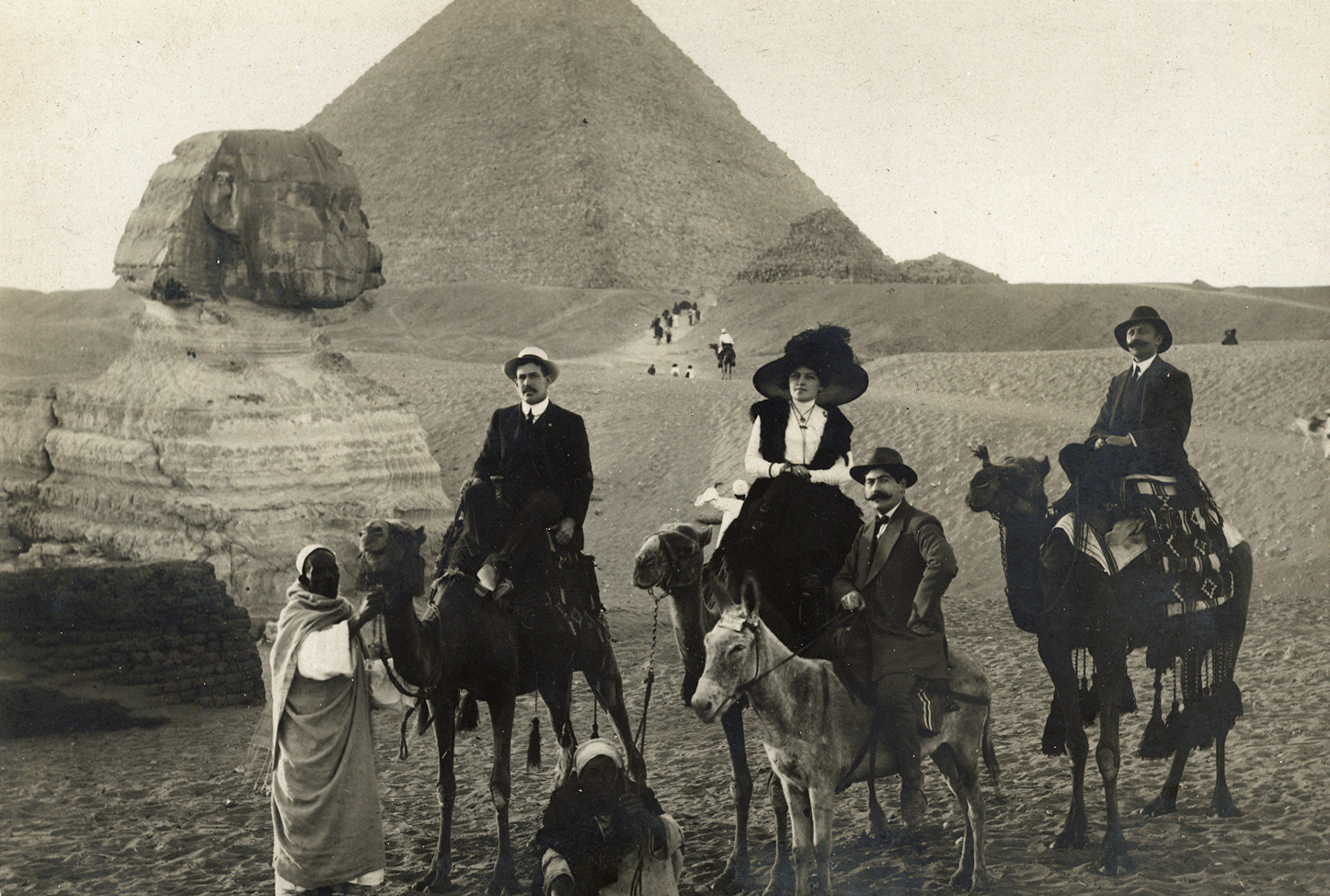
International Driller William Gillespie (white hat) in Egypt in 1910. A driller from Petrolia, Gillespie worked in Cuba, Australia, Central Africa, Egypt, Sumatra and Borneo.

The International Drillers (known historically as the Foreign Drillers) is the name given to the more than 500 drillers from Lambton County who worked in oil fields across the world between December 1873 to the mid-1940s. Many of the International Drillers grew up learning the oil business in Enniskillen County and provided the skilled labour, expertise and technology necessary for the development of the global petroleum industry.

== Overview ==
By the mid-1870s, approximately fifteen years of oil production in Enniskillen County created a highly specialized workforce of drillers, but as the oil boom died down, many of the experienced drillers were left without employment. Several wells petered out, and there were few new discoveries. With Lambton County's oil business beginning to falter compared to the United States, whose drillers were busy drilling domestic fields, Oil exploration companies were directed to Oil Springs and Petrolia in their search for drillers to send overseas. Between December 1873 to the mid-1940s, over 500 drillers from Lambton County brought Canadian expertise and equipment to 87 countries and played key roles in finding and developing oil fields in Asia, Australia, Africa, Europe, the Middle East and South America. As International Drillers' brought the tools and technology from Lambton County abroad, the Canadian pole-tool system of drilling was employed in oil fields across the globe from the 1870s to the 1940s.

The first group of International Drillers travelled to Java in December 1873 amid an economic depression sparked by the Panic of 1873.

Typically, International Drillers grew up learning the oil trade locally and signed contracts of one, three or five years in duration. The Petrolia Advertiser and Petrolia Topic, later merged as the Petrolia Advertiser-Topic in 1917, frequently published letters of the International Drillers exploits overseas. In the late nineteenth and early twentieth century, the International Drillers often travelled without their wives and children. As a result, they would usually only see their family when at home for a few months between assignments. The long periods of separation often strained familial relationships. Beginning in the late 1910s, it became more common for wives and children to join the drillers overseas.

On average, International Drillers earned higher wages than local drillers in Lambton County, and the international companies they worked for often paid for travel and lodging expenses. The local economies of Petrolia and Oil Springs benefitted from the income the International Drillers brought in and local manufactures like Petrolia's Oil Well Supply Company produced the drilling tools and rigs Canadians utilized abroad. The employment abroad also resulted in many International Drillers advancing into the ranks of the middle class. A few International Drillers became extraordinarily wealthy and never returned to Lambton County.

== Legacy ==
In 1917, Historian Victor Ross claimed that the International Drillers from Lambton County had a vital impact on the development of the global oil industry:

No other oil centre on the American Continent has contributed so many expert drillers and oil operators to foreign countries for the production and development of the industry...They have gone from there to the United States, Mexico, Central and South America, the West Indies, Austria, Germany, Russia, Egypt, Sinai, East Africa, Madagascar, Persia, India, Burma, the Orient, Sumatra, Borneo, Java, New Guinea, Australia and New Zealand and have been foremost in locating oil territory, in mechanical inventions, in their methods of production and in the marketing of the product.

A hill overlooking Miri, Malaysia, is named "Canada Hill" in honour of Charles McAlpine, who drilled the first oil well in Borneo.

In Oil Springs, Fairbank Oil's Nature Trail includes an art exhibit dedicated to the International Drillers. Each hand-carved sign represents a country the Foreign Drillers travelled to and each pole represents a content. Artist Geri Binks crafted the exhibit.

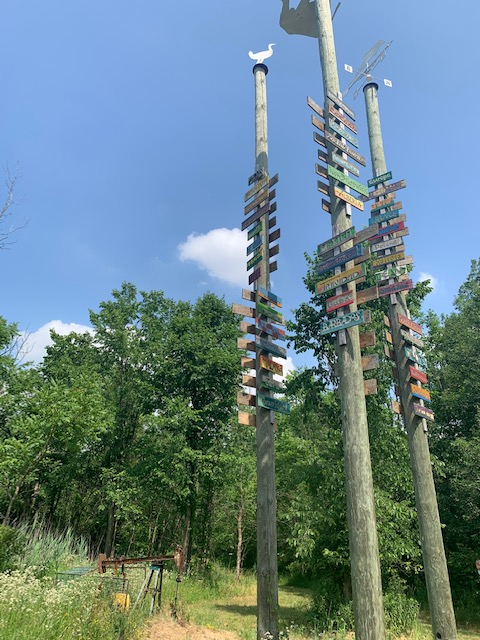
The International Drillers Art Exhibit at the Fairbank Oil Nature Trail in Oil Springs, Ontario

== Notable drillers ==
William Henry McGarvey (November 1843 – November 1914) – operated a highly successful petroleum company in Galicia and became a multimillionaire before the outbreak of World War I.

Charles Wallen (1874–1921) – travelled around the world managing oil fields. Most notable for his and his family's escape from Russia in 1917.

== See also ==
- Driller (oil)
