= Directional boring =

Method of installing underground utilities

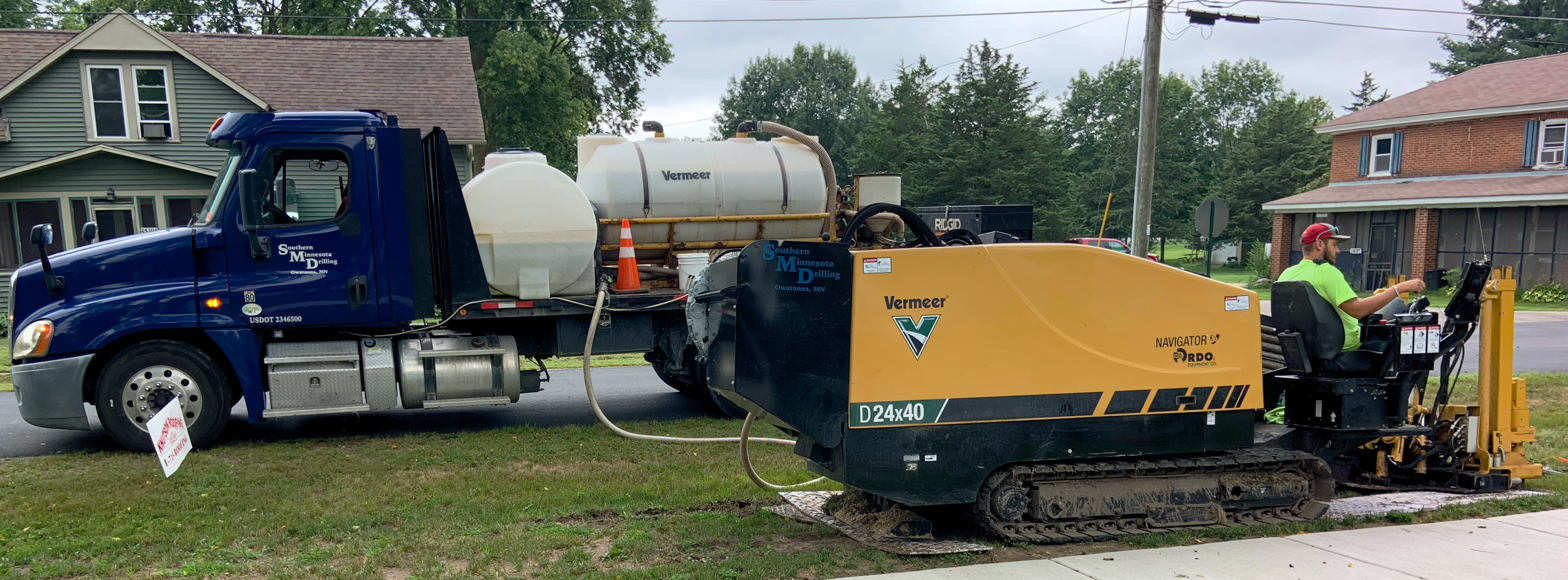
Directional boring machine

Directional boring, also referred to as horizontal directional drilling (HDD), is a minimal impact trenchless method of installing underground utilities such as pipe, conduit, or cables in a relatively shallow arc or radius along a prescribed underground path using a surface-launched drilling rig. Directional boring offers significant environmental advantages over traditional cut and cover pipeline/utility installations. The technique is routinely used when conventional trenching or excavating is not practical or when minimal surface disturbance is required.

Although often used interchangeably, the terms directional boring and horizontal directional drilling are distinct in that they convey a different sense of scale. The term "directional boring" or "bore" is generally reserved for mini/small sized drilling rigs, small diameter bores, and crossing lengths in terms of hundreds of feet. Generally, the term Horizontal Directional Drilling (HDD) is intended to describe large/maxi sized drilling rigs, large diameter bores, and crossing lengths in terms of thousands of feet. Directional boring and HDD are similar in some respects to directional drilling associated with the oil industry, however, an equal comparison cannot be drawn as the procedures serve markedly different functions. Directional boring can be utilized with various pipe materials such as PVC, polyethylene, polypropylene, ductile iron, and steel provided that the pipe's properties (wall thickness and material strength) enable it to be both installed and operated (if applicable) under acceptable stress limits.

Directional boring/HDD is generally accomplished in three principal phases. First, a small diameter pilot hole is drilled along a directional path from one surface point to another. The diameter of the pilot hole is relative to the equipment being used and may range from a few inches to slightly over a foot. Next, the bore created during pilot hole drilling is enlarged to a diameter that will facilitate installation of the desired pipeline. For small diameter installations, reaming or bore enlargement may not be necessary. Lastly, the pipeline is pulled into the enlarged hole, thus creating a continuous segment of pipe underground exposed only at the two initial endpoints. Directional boring can be utilized to cross any number of surface obstacles including roadways, railroads, wetlands, and water bodies of varying sizes/depths.

The process is suitable for a variety of soil conditions including clay, silt, sand, and rock. Problematic soil conditions include large grain content in the form of coarse gravel, cobbles, and boulders. Other subsurface conditions which can impact the feasibility of directional boring include excessive rock strength and abrasivity, poor rock quality or heavily fractured/fissured rock, and rock exhibiting karst features.

== Equipment ==
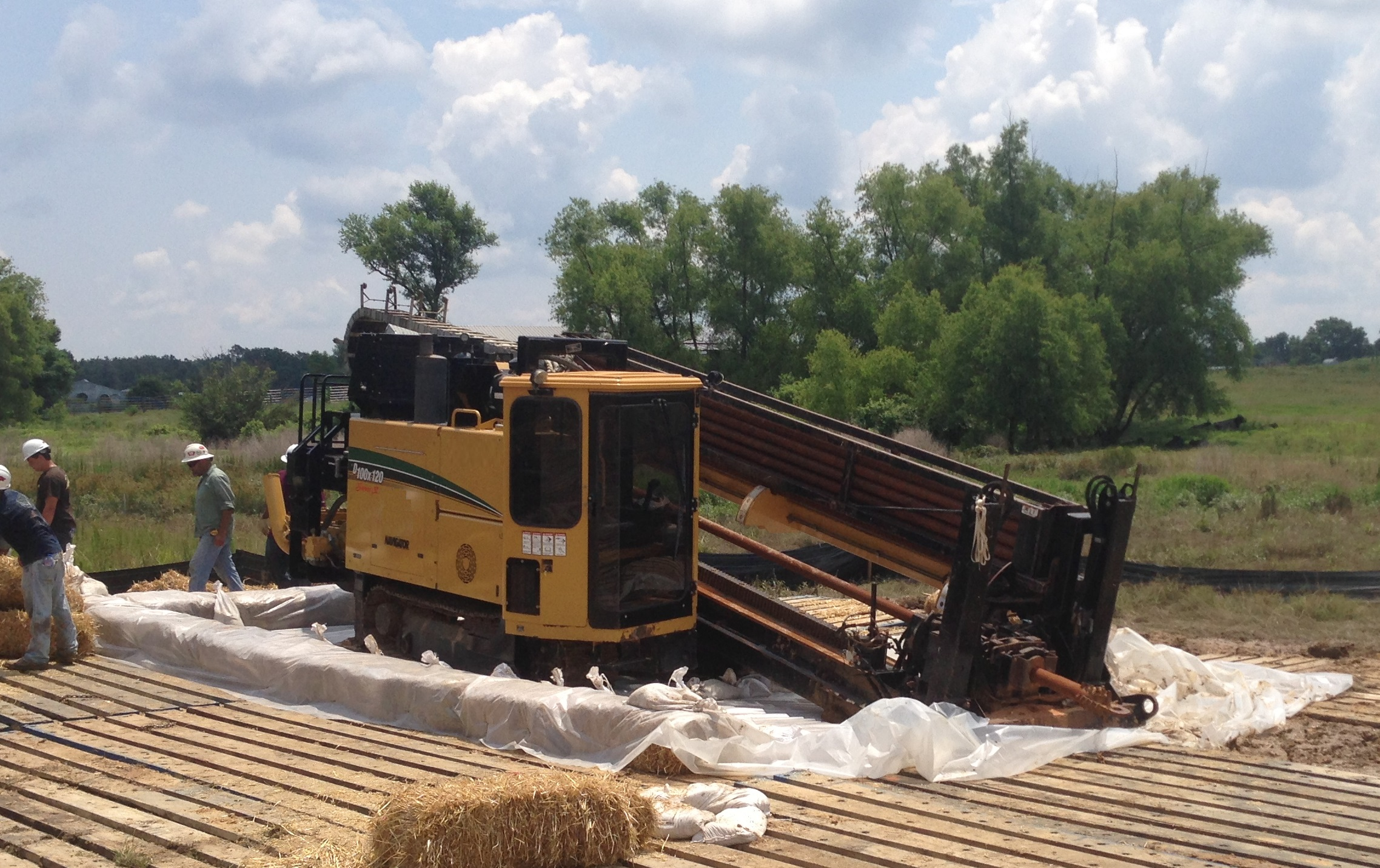
Small HDD drill rig

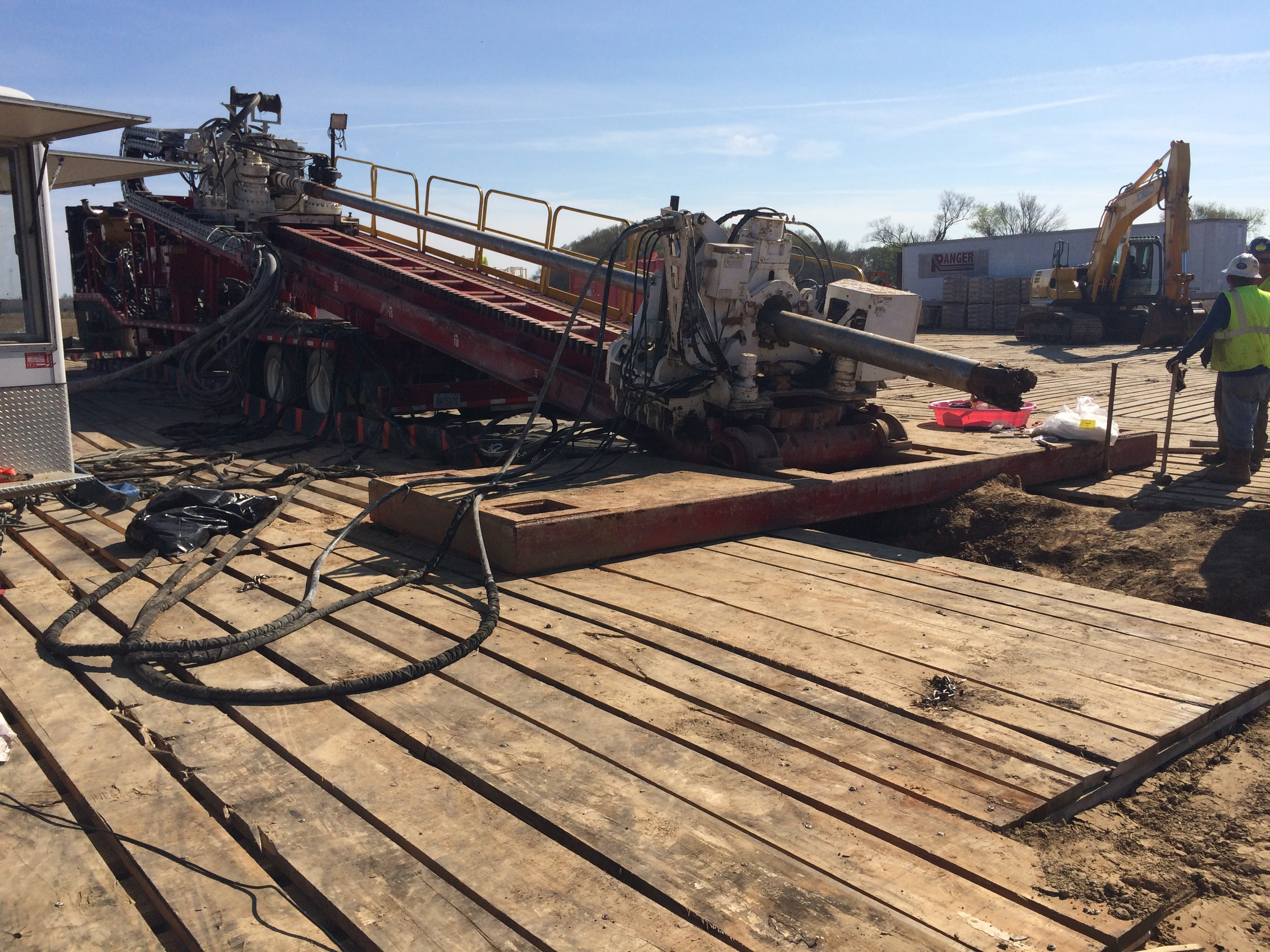
Maxi-sized drill rig

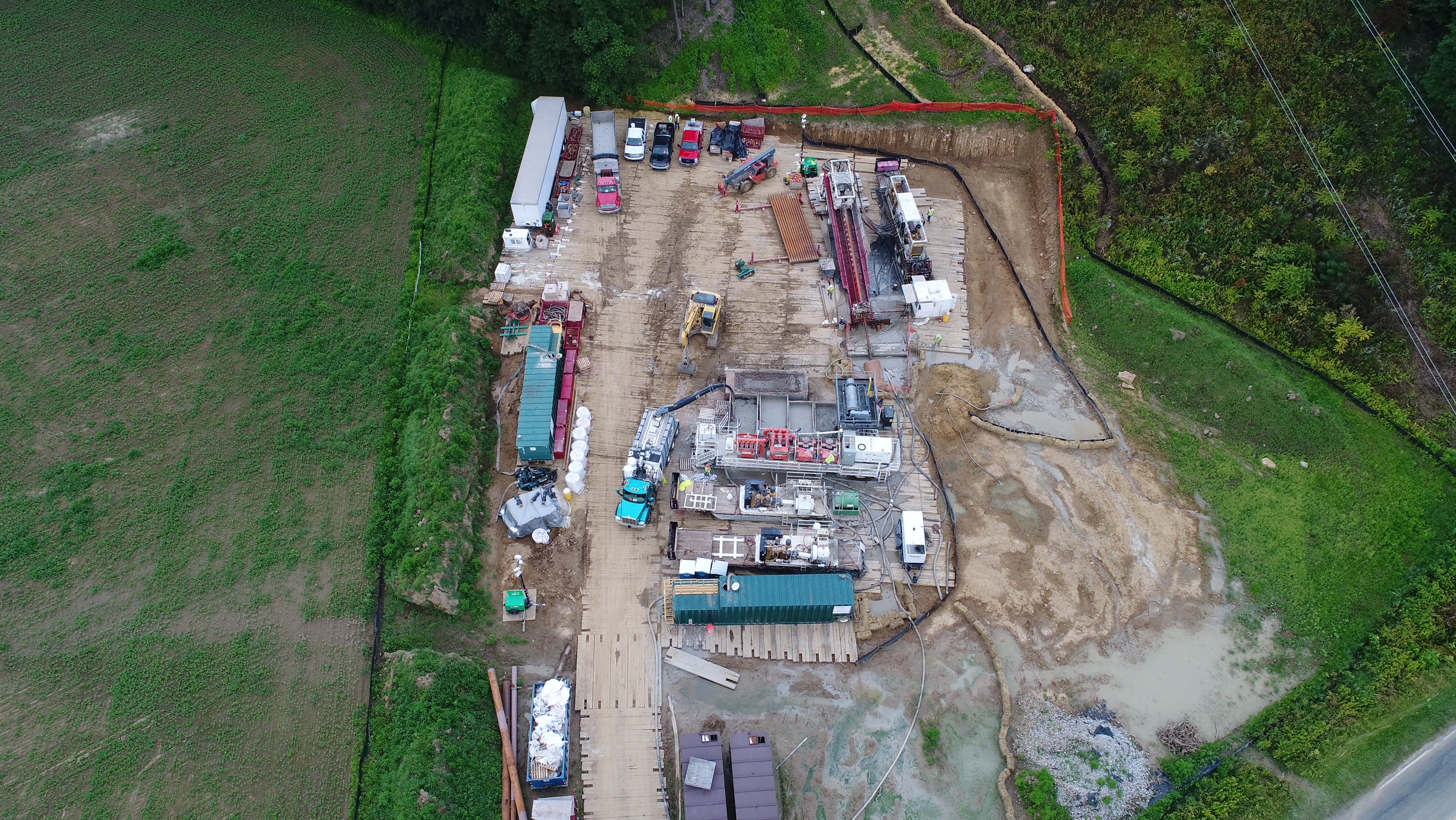
Typical maxi-sized HDD Rrig spread (approximately 50,000 sq ft.)

The equipment used in directional boring depends on the length of the (proposed) crossing, the pipe properties (of the to-be-installed pipeline), and the (anticipated) subsurface conditions.

For longer more challenging crossings, tractor trailer mounted drills capable of 1,320,000 lbs (thrust/pullback force) and 150,000 ft-lbs (rotary force) may be used [600 tonnes- 204,000 N-M ]. These units are used in conjunction with a drilling fluid reclaimer, high volume pump or pumps, an excavator (or comparable equipment for managing drill pipe), along with an assortment of other ancillary equipment (e.g. water tanks, spoil containers, etc.) to facilitate typical operations.

For smaller bores, proportionally smaller and more portable equipment is available. These units may be capable of anywhere from 5,000 lbs to 100,000 lbs of thrust/push force and may be used for spanning between a house basement to a nearby shared water pipe or a short road crossing. Fluid exhaustion associated with smaller bores is proportionally less as well. In many instances, smaller bores do not require the use of drilling fluid, only water, and in even less significant bores no fluids at all.

Tooling, as in the mechanical apparatus that are installed to the drill string to conduct operations, are available in a wide number of different shapes and sizes. Directional boring tooling includes the suite of drill bits or drill heads used during pilot hole operations, reamers and hole-openers used for hole enlargement, and swab tools which are used for hole conditioning and pullback. Tooling intended to navigate rock, or tougher formations, may use tungsten carbide alloys or polycrystalline diamond (PCD). In contrast, tooling intended to navigate soft soils may be limited to high-carbon steel (milled to a desired shape and size). The methodology of advancement also varies somewhat between soil and rock crossings. Advancement of tooling within loose uncemented soils is largely accomplished by hydraulic excavation. That is, the soil is being cut and or removed under the influence of high pressure fluid. Within rock formations, hydraulic excavation is still taking place to some degree (evacuating spoil) but the lion's share of cutting and breaking up material is due to mechanical work being done by the tool itself.

The large rig industry and small rig industry are different enough that each possesses standards and customs associated with construction and best practices. Depths of cover, radii of curvature, and general path geometry differ significantly between large rig and small rig applications. Standards associated with large rig installations are more well established and cauterized into existing literature as opposed to small rig installations, which tend to vary based on application and project specific constraints.

== Technique ==
Directional boring is used for installing infrastructure such as telecom and power cable conduits, water lines, sewer lines, gas lines, oil lines, product pipelines, and environmental remediation casings. It is used for crossing waterways, roadways, shore approaches, congested areas, environmentally sensitive areas, and areas where other methods are costlier or not possible. It is used instead of other techniques to provide less traffic disruption, lower cost, deeper and/or longer installation, no access pit, shorter completion times, directional capabilities, and environmental safety. The cost of directional boring varies based on factors such as soil conditions, bore length, and pipe diameter. Costs can range significantly depending on project complexity and location.

The technique has extensive use in urban areas for developing subsurface utilities as it helps in avoiding extensive open cut trenches. The use requires that the operator have complete information about existing utilities so that they can plan the alignment to avoid damaging those utilities. Since uncontrolled drilling can lead to damage, different agencies/government authorities owning the urban right-of-way or the utilities have rules for safe work execution. For standardization of the techniques, different trenchless technology promoting organizations have developed guidelines for this technique.

== Process ==
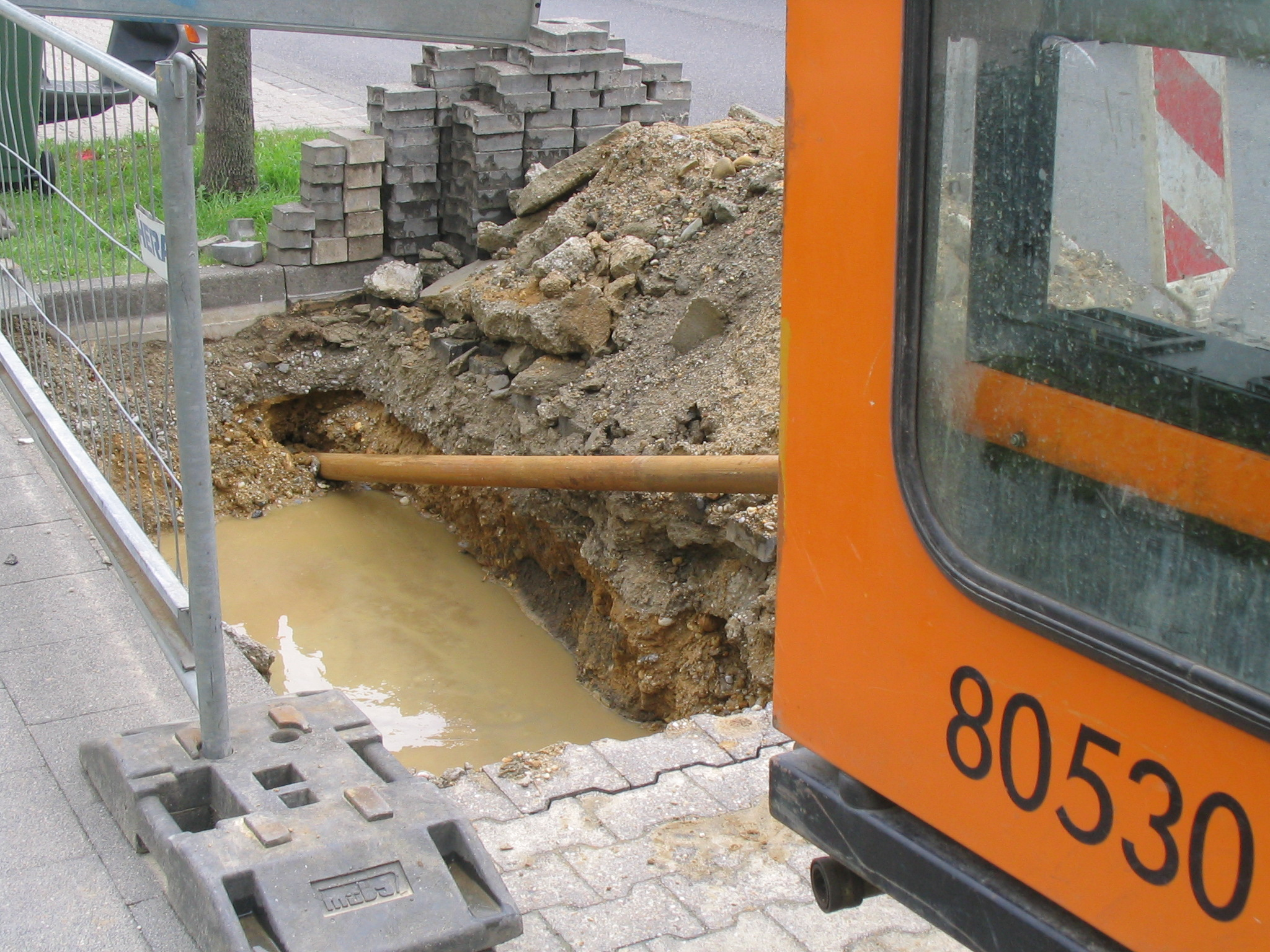
Starting pit with pilot hole and some drilling fluid in the pit

The process starts with the receiving hole and entrance pits. These pits will allow the drilling fluid to be collected and reclaimed to reduce costs and prevent waste. The first stage drills a pilot hole on the designed path, and the second stage (reaming) enlarges the hole by passing a larger cutting tool known as the back reamer. The reamer's diameter depends on the size of the pipe to be pulled back through the bore hole. The driller increases the diameter according to the outer diameter of the conduit and to achieve optimal production. The third stage places the product or casing pipe in the enlarged hole by way of the drill stem; it is pulled behind the reamer to allow centering of the pipe in the newly reamed path.

Horizontal directional drilling is done with the help of a viscous fluid known as drilling fluid. It is a mixture of water and, usually, bentonite or polymer continuously pumped to the cutting head or drill bit to facilitate the removal of cuttings, stabilize the bore hole, cool the cutting head, and lubricate the passage of the product pipe. The drilling fluid is sent into a machine called a reclaimer which removes the drill cuttings and maintains the proper viscosity of the fluid. Drilling fluid holds the cuttings in suspension to prevent them from clogging the bore. A clogged bore creates back pressure on the cutting head, slowing production.

A mud motor (or drilling motor) may be used to steer the direction of the bore hole.

== Locating and guidance ==
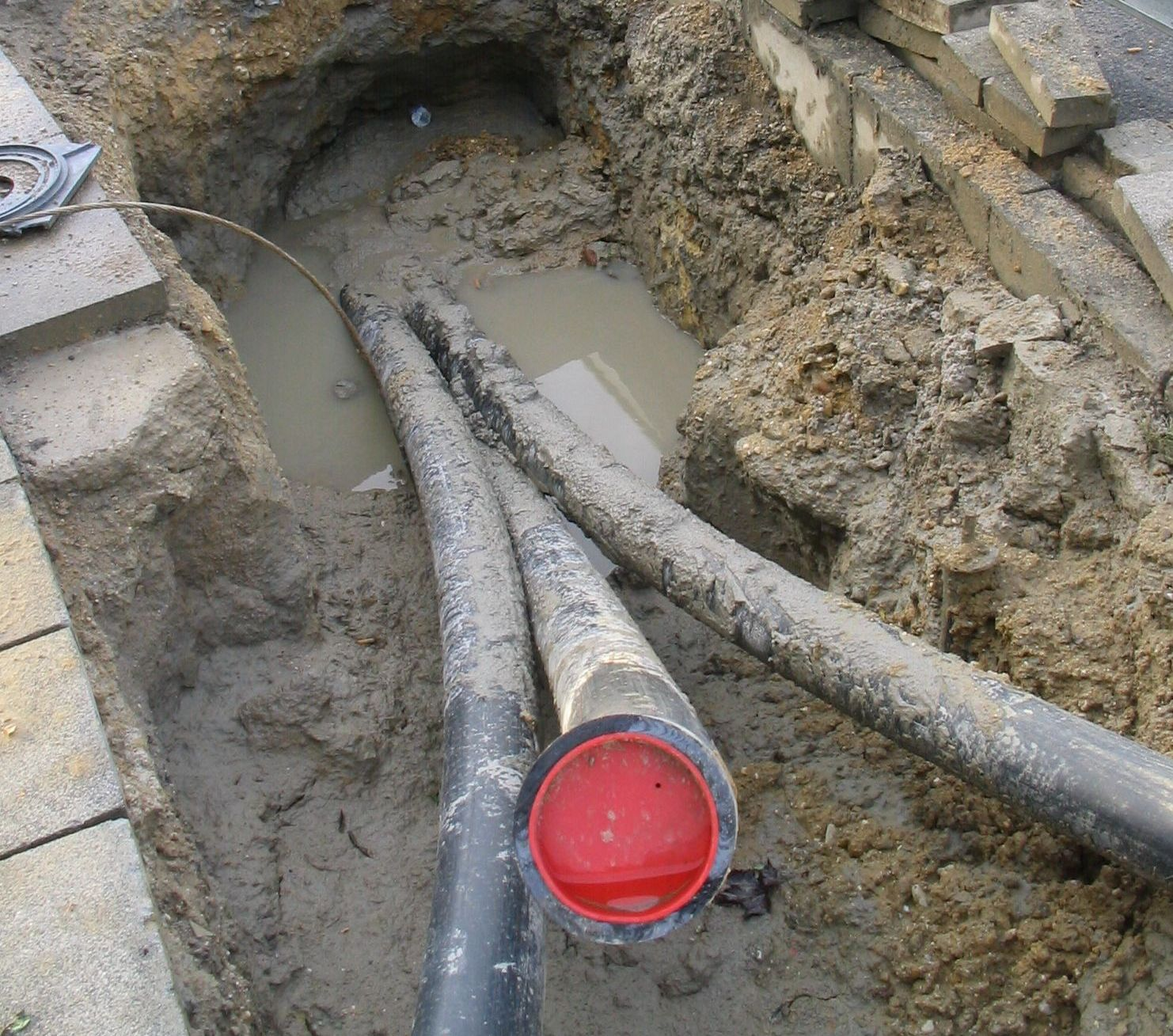
Empty conduits laid by directional boring

Location and guidance of the drilling head is an important part of the drilling operation, as the drilling head is under the ground while drilling and, in most cases, not visible from the ground surface. Uncontrolled or unguided drilling can lead to substantial destruction, which can be eliminated by properly locating and guiding the drill head.

Generally speaking, there are three types of locating equipment for locating the bore head: the walk-over locating system, the magnetic wire-line locating system and the gyro guided drilling, where a full inertial navigation system is located close to the drill head.

- Walk-over locating system — A sonde, or transmitter, behind the bore head registers angle, rotation, direction, and temperature data. This information is encoded into an electromagnetic signal and transmitted through the ground to the surface in a walk-over system. At the surface a receiver (usually a hand-held locator) is manually positioned over the sonde, the signal is decoded and steering directions are relayed to the bore machine operator. Generally speaking, the walkover locating system is wireless, meaning a wireline is not required to be run internally through the drill pipe for power and data communication.
- Wire-line locating system — The wire-line system is a magnetic guidance system. With a magnetic guidance system (MGS), the tool registers directional inclination and azimuth values and such data is transmitted through a wire-line ran through the drill pipe leading from the drill head to the surface. The MGS also typically has a secondary means of location verification utilizing wire grids laid on the ground surface. The wire grid's positioning is surveyed and when current is transmitted through the grid it creates an electromagnetic field of known orientation. Downhole tooling senses the orientation and strength of the magnetic field associated with the surface wire allowing for a secondary determination of positioning. The MGS, even without the use of the wire grid, has been accurate to over 2 km with an accuracy of 2% at depth. The operator of the MGS communicates with the driller and guides him towards a predetermined engineered drill path.
- Gyro-based locating system — The gyro based system is fully autonomous and therefore one of the most accurate systems where sufficient diameter (200 mm) is available and where long distances (up to 2 km) have to be traversed with minimal deviation (less than 1 m position error). Currently the actual depth is not verifiable without the use of surface coils, a near surface transponder or sonde used in walkover systems. Like the MGS wire-line system, most gyro tools require a wire-line to be run through the drill pipe to communicate data to operators at the surface.

All three systems have their own merits, and a particular system is chosen depending upon the site requirements.

== See also ==
- Trenchless technology
- Underground pneumatic boring
