= Mud motor =

Kind of motor used in drilling

Mud motor animation

A mud motor (or drilling motor) is a progressive cavity positive displacement pump (PCPD) placed in the drill string to provide additional power to the bit while drilling. The PCPD pump uses drilling fluid (commonly referred to as drilling mud, or just mud) to create eccentric motion in the power section of the motor which is transferred as concentric power to the drill bit. The mud motor uses different rotor and stator configurations to provide optimum performance for the desired drilling operation, typically increasing the number of lobes and length of power assembly for greater horsepower. In certain applications, compressed air, or other gas, can be used for mud motor input power. Normal rotation of the bit while using a mud motor can be from 60 rpm to over 100 rpm.

== Basic principle ==
Based on the principle developed by René Moineau, the theory states that a helical rotor with one or more lobes will rotate eccentrically when the stator contains more lobes than the rotor. The flow of the fluid transmits power allowing the assembly to rotate and turn the bit.

== Normal construction/usage ==
Normal mud motor construction consists of a top sub, which connects the mud motor to the drill string; the power section, which consists of the rotor and stator; the transmission section, where the eccentric power from the rotor is transmitted as concentric power to the bit using a constant-velocity joint; the bearing assembly which protects the tool from off bottom and on bottom pressures; and the bottom sub which connects the mud motor to the bit.

When the bit is bottomed and the motor is effectively working, there is a notable increase in the pressure in the fluid system. This is caused by a restriction within the motor and is termed differential pressure. If this differential pressure is too high then the motor can stall which means the bit has stopped turning and this can cause severe damage to the internal surface of the stator.

A mud motor is described in terms of its number of stages, lobe ratio and external diameter. Stages are the number of full twists that the stator makes from one end to the other and the lobe ratio is the number of lobes on the stator divided to the number of lobes on the rotor (the stator always has one more lobe than the rotor). A higher number of stages indicates a more powerful motor. A higher number of lobes indicates a higher torque output (for a given differential pressure), a lower number of lobes indicates a reduction in the torque produced but a faster bit rotation speed.

The operating parameters include flow rate, bit rpm and torque. The relationship between the rotor and the stator geometry determines the rotational speed and torque. The rotational speed is proportional to the flow rate and torque is proportional to the pressure drop in the fluid as it flows through the motor. The more lobes the higher the torque and the slower the rpm.

The use of mud motors is greatly dependent on financial efficiency. In straight vertical holes, the mud motor may be used solely for increased rate of penetration, or to minimize erosion and wear on the drill string, since the drill string does not need to be turned as fast.

The majority of mud motor use is in the drilling of directional holes. Although other methods may be used to steer the bit to the desired target zone, they are more time-consuming, which adds to the cost of the well. Mud motors can be configured to have a bend in them using different settings on the motor itself. Typical mud motors can be modified from 0 degrees to 4 degrees with approximately six increments in deviation per degree of bend. The amount of bend is determined by rate of climb needed to reach the target zone. By using a measurement while drilling (MWD) tool, a directional driller can steer the bit to the desired target zone.

Steerable motors are used to drill the kick-off point. When drilling the kick-off point it is recommended to avoid drilling a soft formation immediately below a hard one. In hard abrasive formations the high-side forces at kick-off can cause severe bit shank wear. Ideally the kick-off point should be selected in a non-abrasive homogenous formation.

== Advantages ==
- Extremely hard rock formations can be drilled with motors using diamond or polycrystalline diamond compact bits.
- High penetration rates can be achieved since rotation speeds are high.
- Allows circulation of the borehole regardless of the horsepower or torque produced by the motor.

== Major disadvantage in oilfield applications ==
The PCPD stator, which is a major component of the pump, is usually lined with an elastomer. Most of PCPD pump failures are due to this elastomer part. However, the operating conditions and environment should not degrade or induce mechanical failure of the elastomer part for the life of the equipment. Unfortunately, the industry does not have elastomers that can last longer, resisting abrasive fluids and solids, and withstand deflections in operating temperatures. The most common elastomer grades used for this application are the NBR (nitrile or acrylonitrile butadiene rubber) grades, which perform moderately well. There is definitely a need for better elastomer compounds to reach areas which are not currently accessible by PCPDs and also improve the life of current products.

- Bit speeds can be very high and as such bit selection is important. The high speeds may limit the use of certain types of bits.
- Special pump requirements, as particular pressures and flow rates may be needed to maintain proper and efficient motor operation.
- If used for directional control, the down-hole assembly may be long and this may take time to assemble on the rig floor.
- The mud motor may be sensitive to fouling agents. This means that certain types of drilling fluids or additives may ruin the motor or lower its performance. One particular example, as mentioned above, would be the use of oil-based mud with the mud motor. Over time the oil degrades the elastomers and the seals in the motor.

== Failure mechanisms ==
Chunking – where the rubber across the top of the stator has been worn away.

Debonding - failure in the steel tube to bonding agent; failure in the elastomers to bonding agent of bonding agent to bonding agent.

Poor rotor/stator fit – improper tolerances due to degradation with time. Also if the fit is wrong then the differential pressure may be either too high or too low. Too high and it may damage the motor; too low and the motor will be weak and stall which may lead to stator chunking.

The down-hole and mud temperatures may cause thermal fatigue of the stator. Care must be taken to compensate for stator swelling.

Certain drilling fluids may cause the stator elastomers to swell. Consideration of this and the bottom hole temperatures is also a factor.

Lost circulation can plug the motor and sharp edged objects can wear the motor internals.

== See also ==
- Logging while drilling (LWD)
- Measurement while drilling (MWD)
