= Borehole =

Narrow shaft bored in the ground

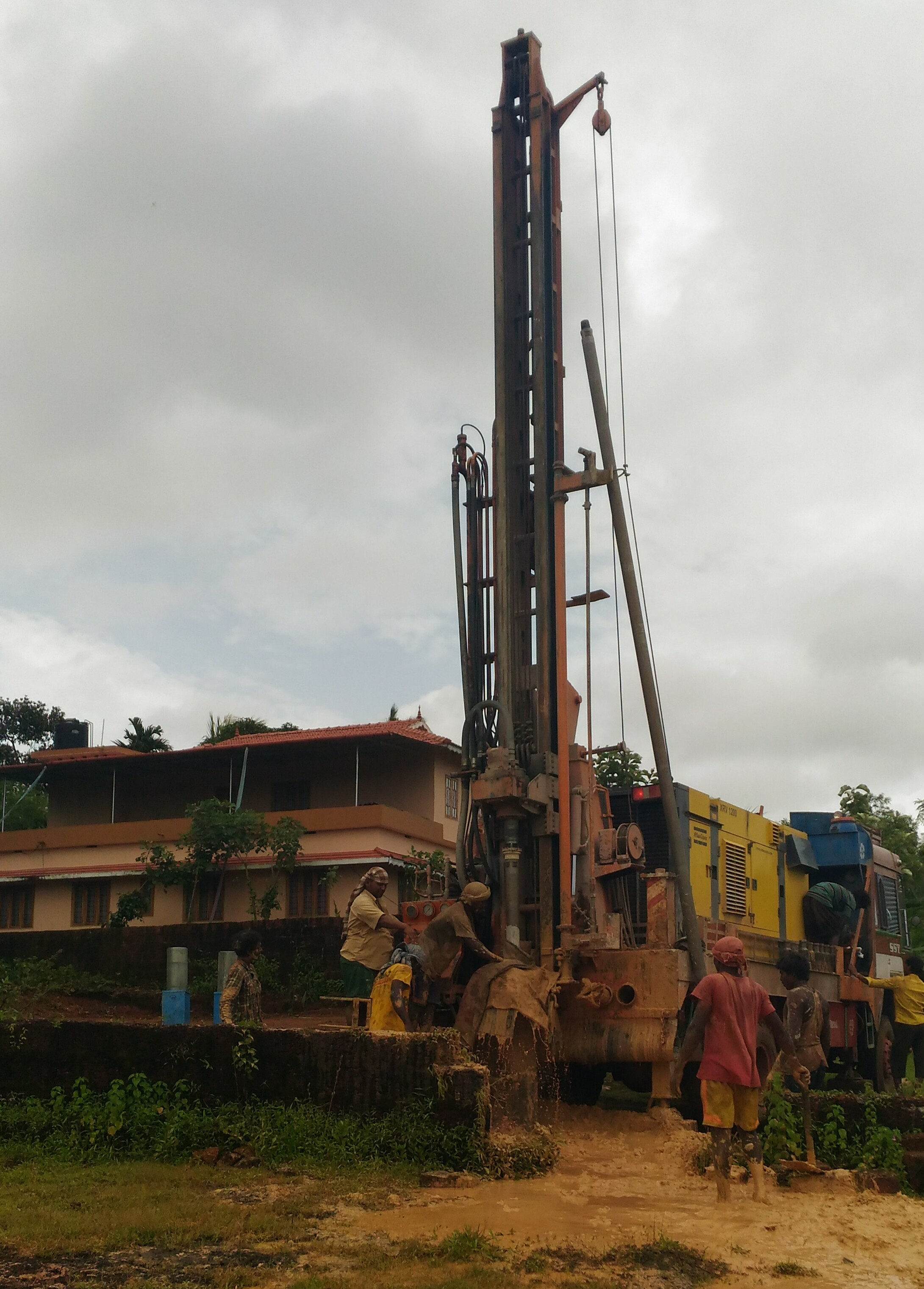
Borehole digging for a borewell or tube well

Borewell digging

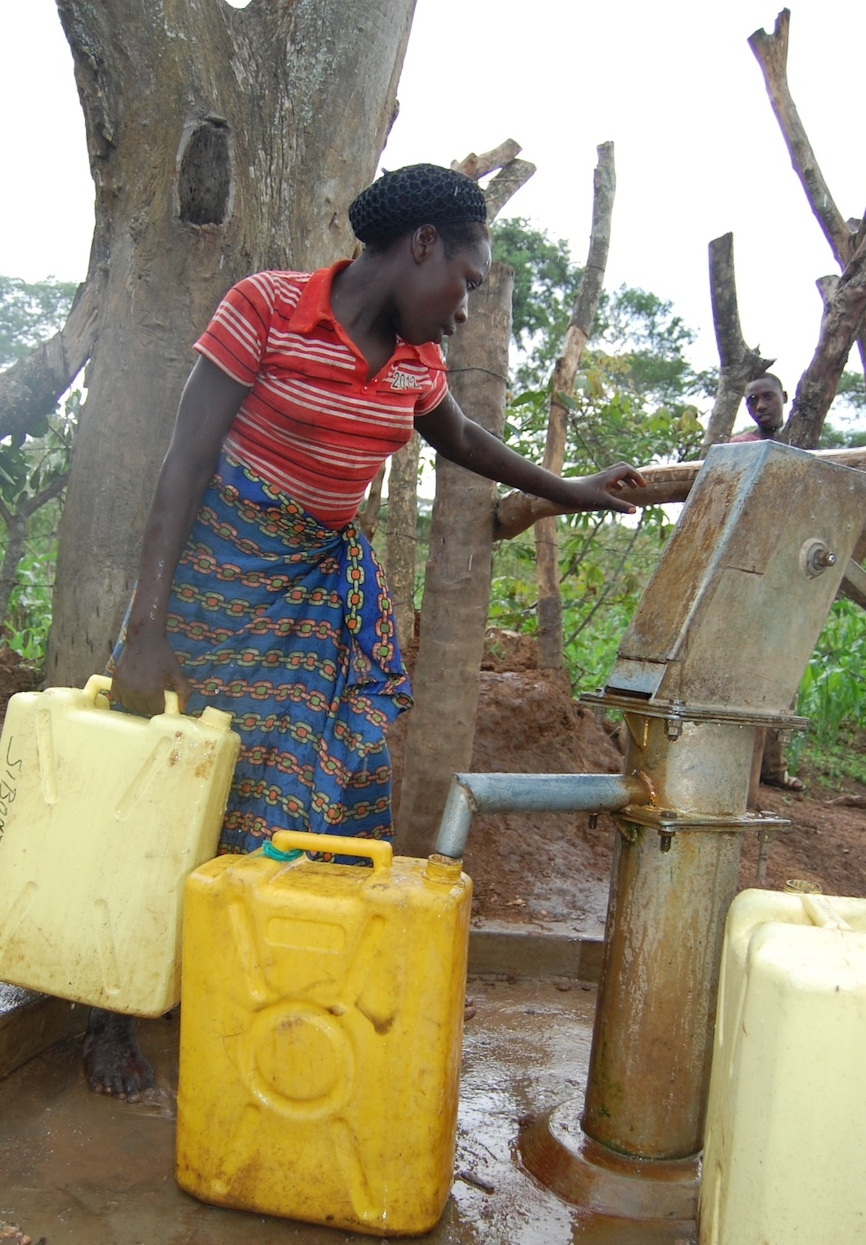
A woman in Uganda collects water from a borehole and attached hand pump

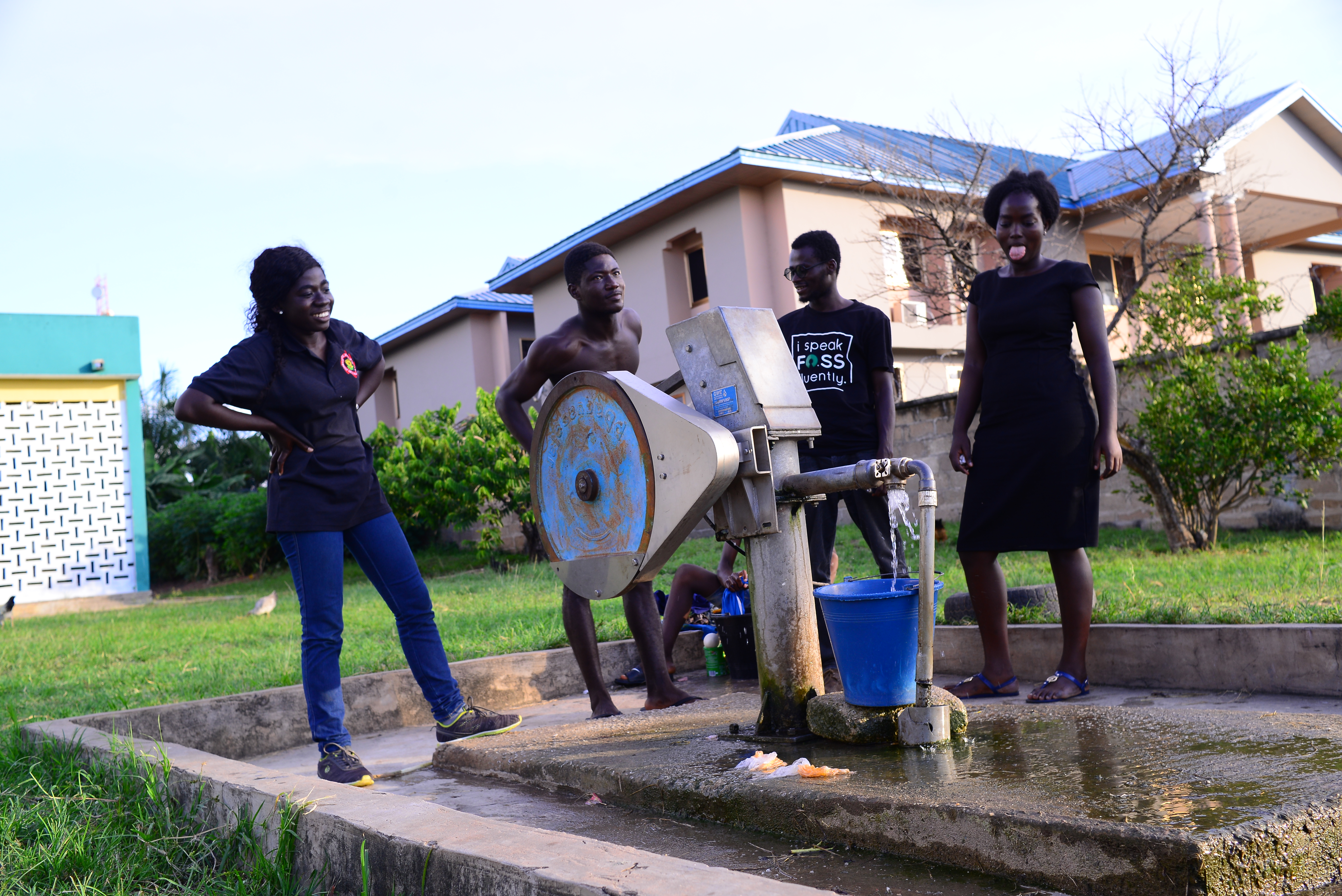
A drilled well in Ghana; the borehole is not visible

A borehole is a narrow shaft drilled into the ground, either vertically or horizontally. Boreholes range from shallow holes just a few feet deep to engineered shafts extending hundreds or even thousands of feet underground. A borehole may be constructed for many different purposes, including the extraction of water ( through drilled wells and tube wells), other liquids (such as petroleum), or gases (such as natural gas). It may also be used for geotechnical investigation, environmental site assessment, mineral exploration, temperature measurement, as a pilot hole for installing piers or underground utilities, for geothermal installations, or for underground storage of unwanted substances, e.g. in carbon capture and storage.

== Importance ==
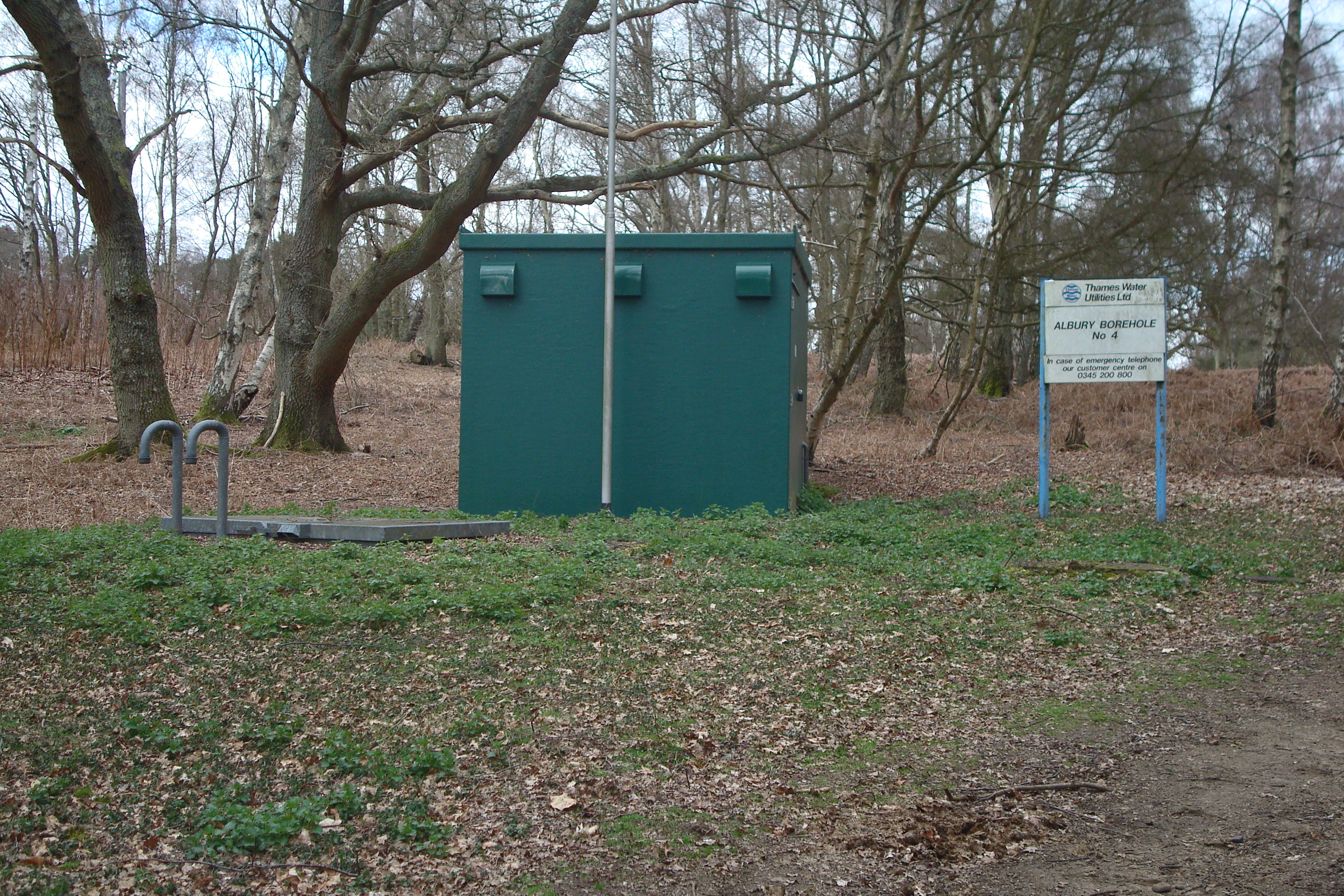
A water resources borehole into the chalk aquifer under the North Downs, England at Albury

Engineers and environmental consultants use the term borehole to collectively describe all of the various types of holes drilled as part of a geotechnical investigation or environmental site assessment (a so-called Phase II ESA). This includes holes advanced to collect soil samples, water samples or rock cores, to advance in situ sampling equipment, or to install monitoring wells or piezometers. Samples collected from boreholes are often tested in a laboratory to determine their physical properties, or to assess levels of various chemical constituents or contaminants.

Typically, a borehole used as a water well is completed by installing a vertical pipe (casing) and well screen to keep the borehole from caving. This also helps prevent surface contaminants from entering the borehole and protects any installed pump from drawing in sand and sediment. Oil and natural gas wells are completed in a similar, albeit usually more complex, manner.

As detailed in proxy (climate), borehole temperature measurements at a series of different depths can be effectively "inverted" (a mathematical formula to solve a matrix equation) to help estimate historic surface temperatures.

Clusters of small-diameter boreholes equipped with heat exchangers made of plastic PEX pipe can be used to store heat or cold between opposing seasons in a mass of native rock. The technique is called seasonal thermal energy storage. Media that can be used for this technique ranges from gravel to bedrock. There can be a few to several hundred boreholes, and in practice, depths have ranged from 50 to 300 metres (150 to 1,000 ft).

== History ==
Borehole drilling has a long history. By at least the Han dynasty (202 BC – 220 AD), the Chinese used deep borehole drilling for mining and other projects. The British sinologist and historian Michael Loewe states that borehole sites could reach as deep as 600 metres (2,000 ft). K.S. Tom describes the drilling process: "The Chinese method of deep drilling was accomplished by a team of men jumping on and off a beam to impact the drilling bit while the boring tool was rotated by buffalo and oxen." This was the same method used for extracting petroleum in California during the 1860s (i.e. "kicking her down"). A Western Han dynasty bronze foundry discovered in Xinglong, Hebei had nearby mining shafts which reached depths of 100 metres (330 ft) with spacious mining areas; the shafts and rooms were complete with a timber frame, ladders and iron tools. By the first century BC, Chinese craftsmen cast iron drill bits and drillers were able to drill boreholes up to 1,500 metres (4,900 ft) deep. By the eleventh century AD, the Chinese were able to drill boreholes up to 900 metres (3,000 ft) in depth. Drilling for boreholes was time-consuming and long. As the depth of the holes varied, the drilling of a single well could last nearly one full decade. It was not up until the 19th century that Europe and the West would catch up and rival ancient Chinese borehole drilling technology.

For many years, the world's longest borehole was the Kola Superdeep Borehole in Russia. From 2011 until August 2012, the record was held by the 12,345-metre (40,502 ft) long Sakhalin-I Odoptu OP-11 Well, offshore the Russian island Sakhalin. The Chayvo Z-44 extended-reach well took the title of the world's longest borehole on 27 August 2012. Z-44's total measured depth is 12,376 metres (40,604 ft). However, ERD wells are more shallow than the Kola Borehole, owing to a large horizontal displacement. In July 2023, China began drilling deep boreholes, one at the Sichuan Basin expected to reach 10,520 metres (34,510 ft) into the ground, and the other at the Tarim Basin with a planned depth of 11,100 metres (36,400 ft).

== Methodology ==
Drillers may sink a borehole using a drilling rig, or a hand-operated rig. The machinery and techniques to advance a borehole vary considerably according to manufacturer, geological conditions, and the intended purpose. For offshore drilling floating units or platforms supported by the seafloor are used for the drilling rig.

== Hand digging ==
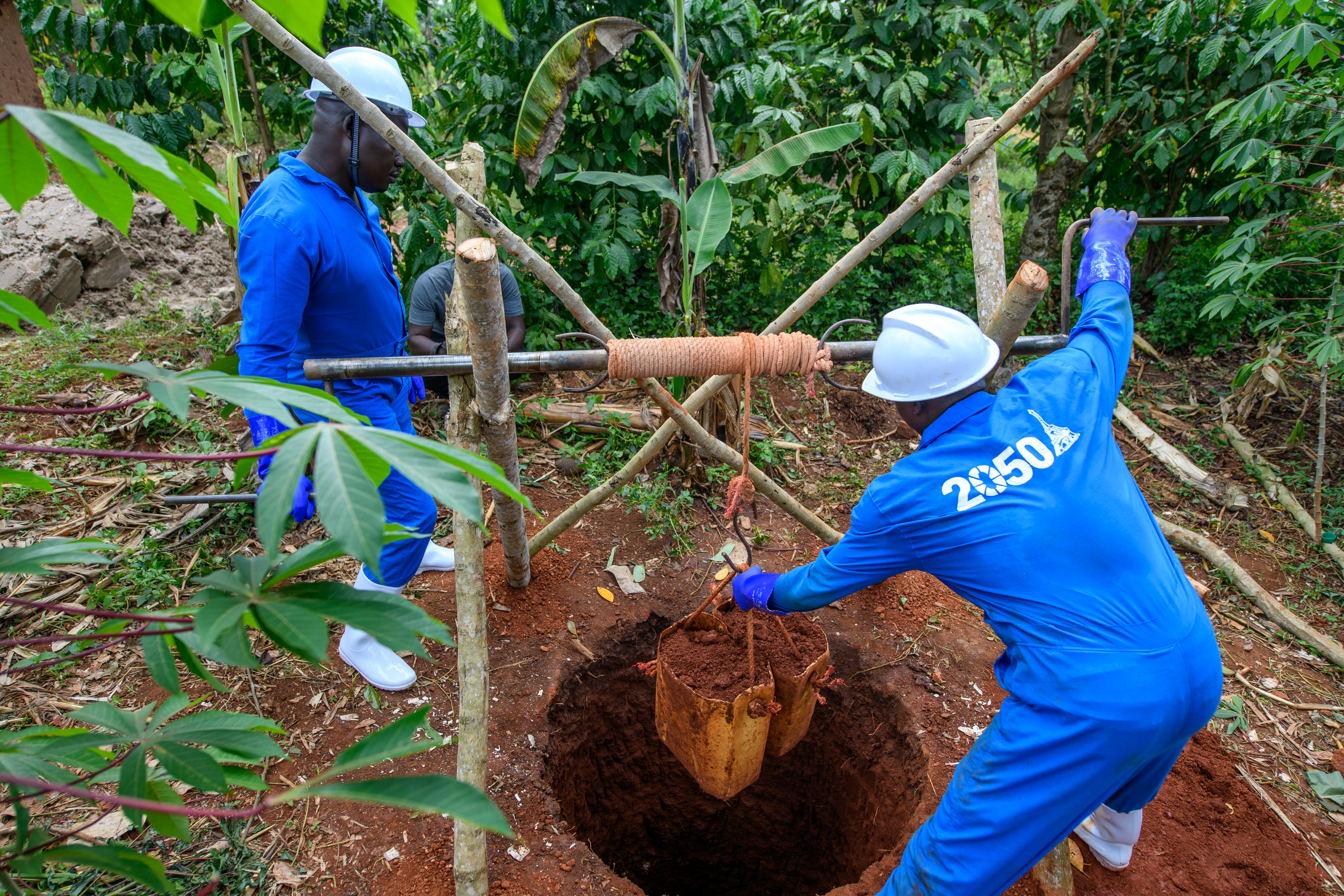
Two borehole diggers manually digging a borehole

Especially in developing countries many boreholes are still dug by hand. The digging begins with manual labor using basic tools such as shovels, picks, and crowbars. Workers excavate the soil layer by layer, often using a circular motion to create a well-shaped hole. The process is slow and demanding, requiring teamwork and coordination. To prevent the walls from collapsing and to ensure water quality, the borehole is lined with materials like bricks, stones, or concrete rings. This reinforcement maintains the integrity of the borehole's structure, and helps to prevent contamination. A concrete platform or slab may be installed at the bottom to prevent sediment from entering the water. The top of the borehole is capped to protect it from debris and contamination.

== See also ==
- Askam Borehole in Pennsylvania
- Casing cutter
- Deep borehole disposal
- Hole opener
- Horizontal drillhole disposal
- Kola Superdeep Borehole
- Vertical seismic profile
