= Driller (oil) =

Leader in charge during well drilling

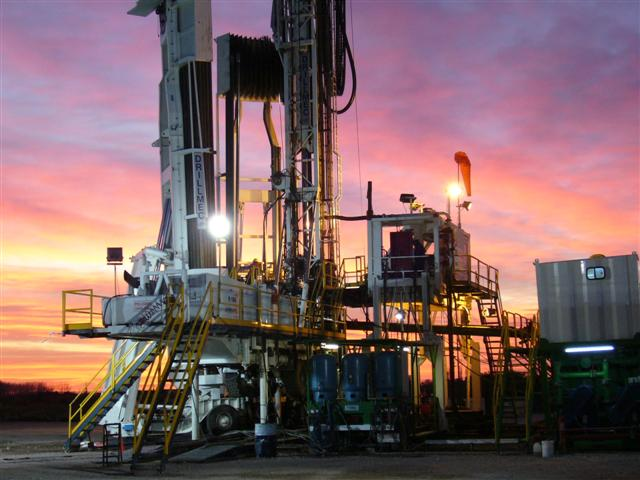
La Pampa Argentina

The Driller is a team leader in charge during the process of well drilling. The term is commonly used in the context of an oil well drilling rig. Driller comes after the Toolpusher in the Rig crew hierarchy. Toolpusher takes the operation orders from the Company-man. Toolpusher then supervises these order to the driller and the rest of the drilling crew and gets the job done. While Toolpusher, driller and the drilling crew generally belong to the Drilling contractor company, Company-man is the employee of the operator company.

The driller is in charge of the crew, and running the rig itself. Most of the time, their job is simply to monitor the rig's activity, while the automatic driller runs the breaks and drills the hole. The driller is responsible for interpreting the signals the well gives regarding gas and fluids with high pressure. In an emergency he is also responsible for taking the correct counter measures to stop an uncontrolled well control situation from emerging. The driller will watch for gas levels coming out of the hole, how much drilling mud is going in, and other information. While tripping, the driller will run the floor and work the rig.

While Company-man takes all the decision on the rig (after consulting the supervisors in the office), but at times of emergency the driller will be the one in charge of real time decisions. According to and, the hierarchy on an oil platform corresponds to the timescale of which the sections operate. The automatic drilling equipment work on the timescale of seconds and both reports to and gets its orders from the driller, who operates on a timescale of several seconds to hours. The person will report and gets his or her orders from those planning the current drilling operation, on a timescale of days and weeks. The chain extends to those who are in charge of managing the whole oil field, on a timescale of decades.

== See also ==
- International Drillers
