= Drilling rig =

Integrated system to drill wells

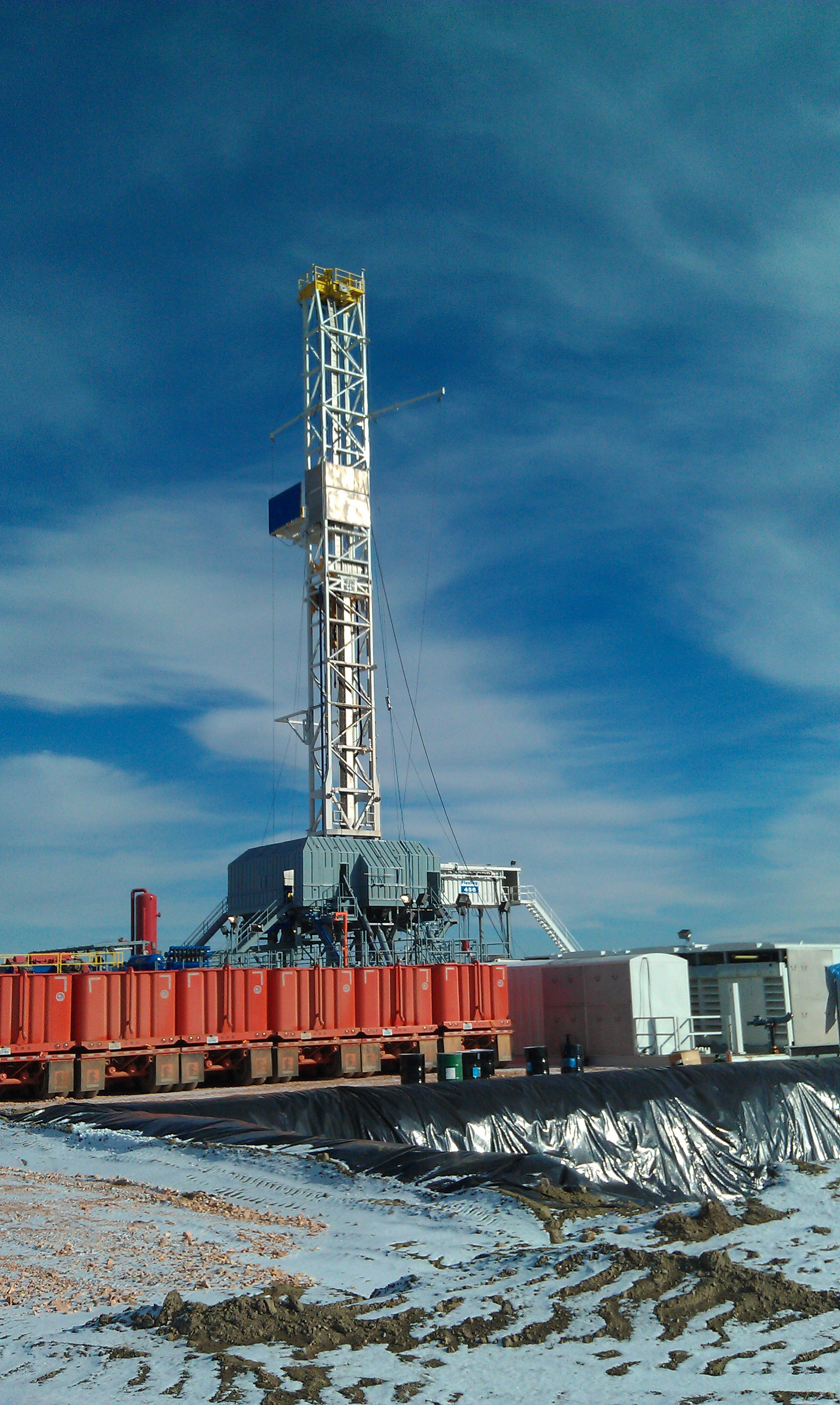
Drilling the Bakken Formation in the Williston Basin

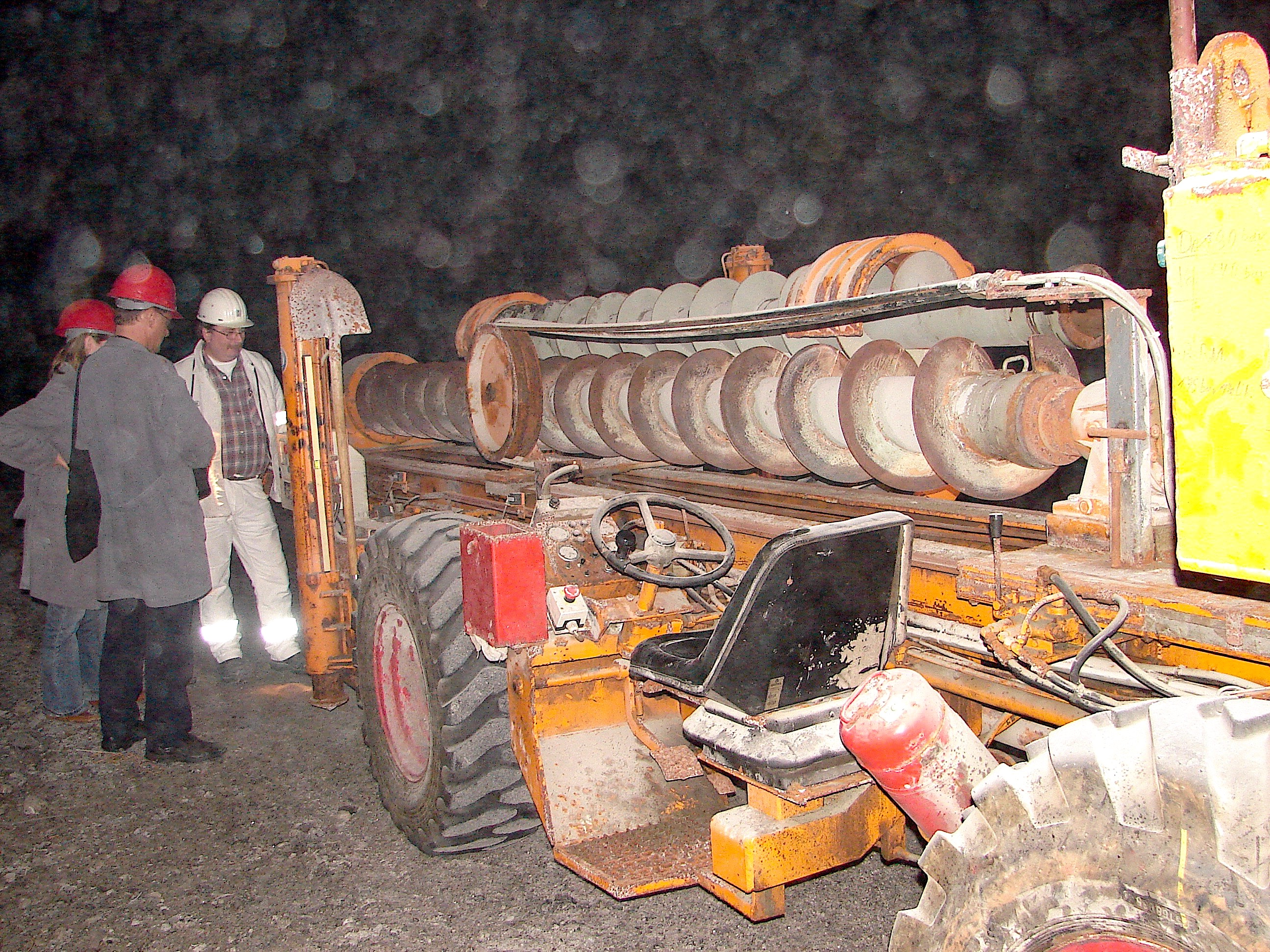
Large hole drilling rig for blast-hole drilling

A drilling rig is an integrated system that drills wells, such as oil or water wells, or holes for piling and other construction purposes, into the earth's subsurface. Drilling rigs can be massive structures housing equipment used to drill water wells, oil wells, or natural gas extraction wells, or they can be small enough to be moved manually by one person and such are called augers. Drilling rigs can sample subsurface mineral deposits, test rock, soil and groundwater physical properties, and also can be used to install sub-surface fabrications, such as underground utilities, instrumentation, tunnels or wells. Drilling rigs can be mobile equipment mounted on trucks, tracks or trailers, or more permanent land or marine-based structures (such as oil platforms, commonly called 'offshore oil rigs' even if they don't contain a drilling rig). The term "rig" therefore generally refers to the complex equipment that is used to penetrate the surface of the Earth's crust.

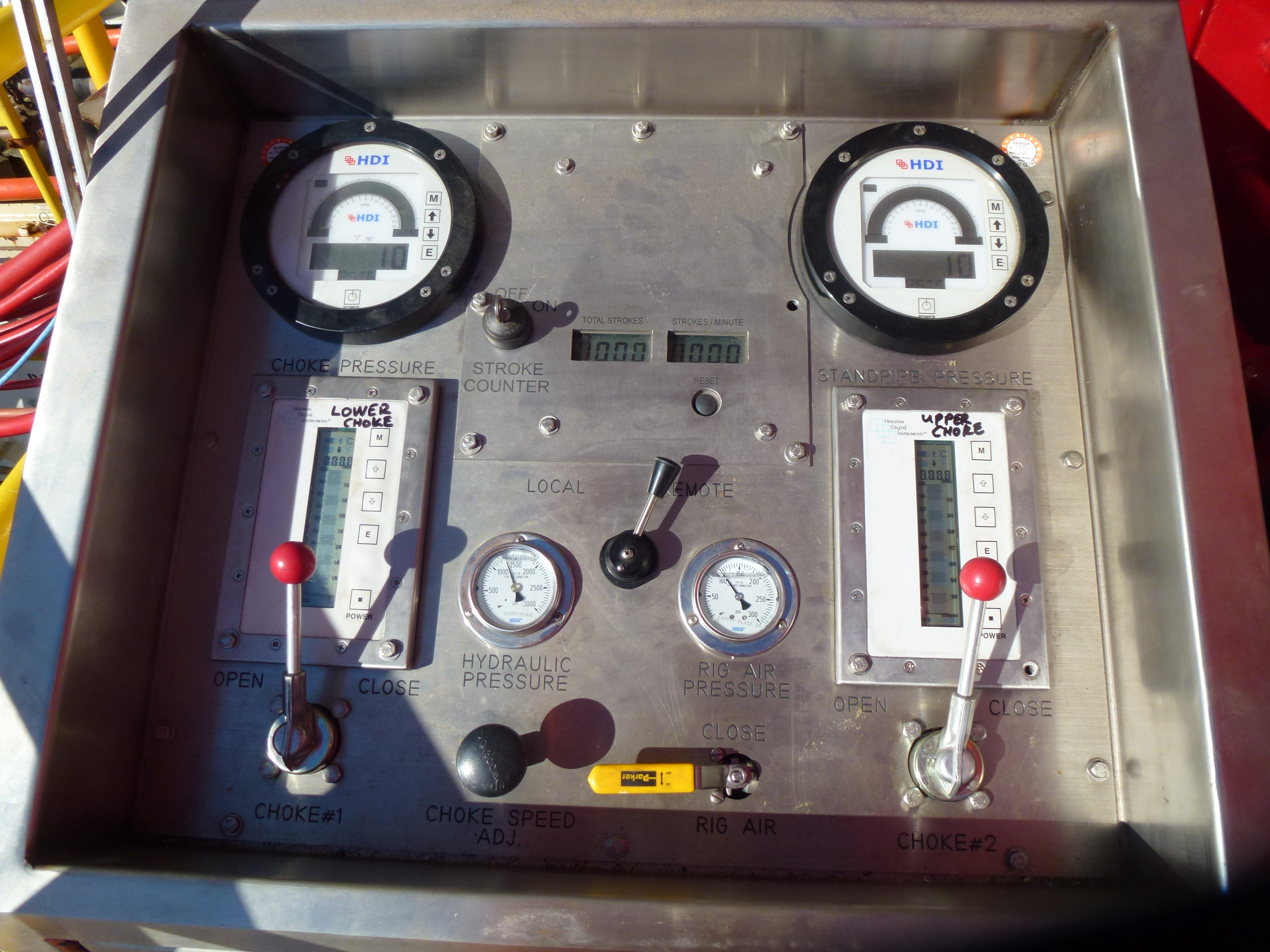
Remote control panel for a blowout preventer on an oil drilling rig

Small to medium-sized drilling rigs are mobile, such as those used in mineral exploration drilling, blast-hole, water wells and environmental investigations. Larger rigs are capable of drilling through thousands of metres of the Earth's crust, using large "mud pumps" to circulate drilling fluid (slurry) through the bit and up the casing annulus, for cooling and removing the "cuttings" while a well is drilled. Hoists in the rig, a derrick, can lift hundreds of tons of pipe. Other equipment can force acid or sand into reservoirs to facilitate extraction of the oil or natural gas; and in remote locations there can be permanent living accommodation and catering for crews (which may be more than a hundred). Marine rigs may operate thousands of miles distant from the supply base with infrequent crew rotation or cycle.

== History ==
Antique drilling rig now on display at Western History Museum in Lingle, Wyoming. It was used to drill many water wells in that area—many of those wells are still in use.

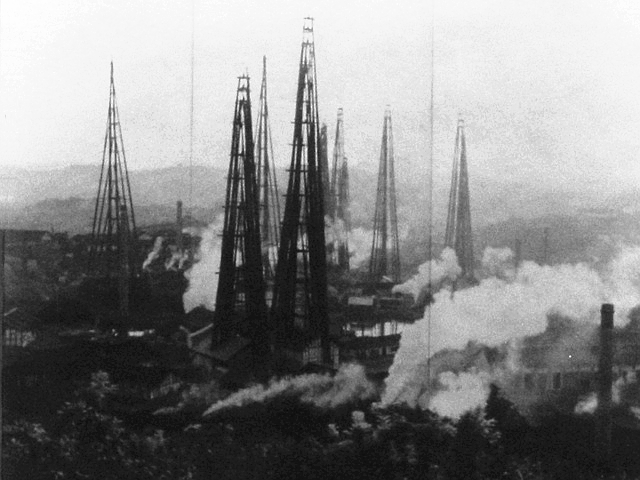
Antique drilling rigs in Zigong, China

Until internal combustion engines were developed in the late 19th century, the main method for drilling rock was muscle power of man or animal. The technique of oil drilling through percussion or rotary drilling has its origins dating back to the ancient Chinese Han dynasty in 100 BC, where percussion drilling was used to extract natural gas in the Sichuan province. Early oil and gas drilling methods were seemingly primitive although the process required several technical skills. The skills involved the availability of heavy iron bits and long bamboo poles, the manufacturing of long and sturdy cables woven from bamboo fiber, and levers. Heavy iron bits were attached to long bamboo cables suspended from bamboo derricks and then were repeatedly raised and dropped into a manually dug hole by having two to six men jumping on a lever. Han dynasty oil wells made by percussion drilling were effective but only reached 10 meters deep and 100 meters by the 10th century. By the 16th century, the Chinese were exploring and drilling oil wells more than 2,000 feet (610 m) deep. Chinese well drilling technology was introduced to Europe in 1828. A modernized variant of the ancient Chinese drilling technique was used by American businessman Edwin Drake to drill Pennsylvania's first oil well in 1859 using small steam engines to power the drilling process rather than by human muscle. Cable tool drilling was developed in ancient China and was used for drilling brine wells. The salt domes also held natural gas, which some wells produced and which was used for evaporation of the brine. Drake learned of cable tool drilling from Chinese laborers in the U.S. The first primary product was kerosene for lamps and heaters. Similar developments around Baku fed the European market.

In the 1970s, outside of the oil and gas industry, roller bits using mud circulation were replaced by the first pneumatic reciprocating piston Reverse Circulation (RC) drills. The former became essentially obsolete for most shallow drilling, now only used in certain situations where rocks preclude other methods. RC drilling proved much faster and more efficient. It continues to improve with better metallurgy, deriving harder, more durable bits and new compressors capable of delivering higher air pressures at higher volumes, enabling deeper and faster penetration. Diamond drilling has remained essentially unchanged since its inception.

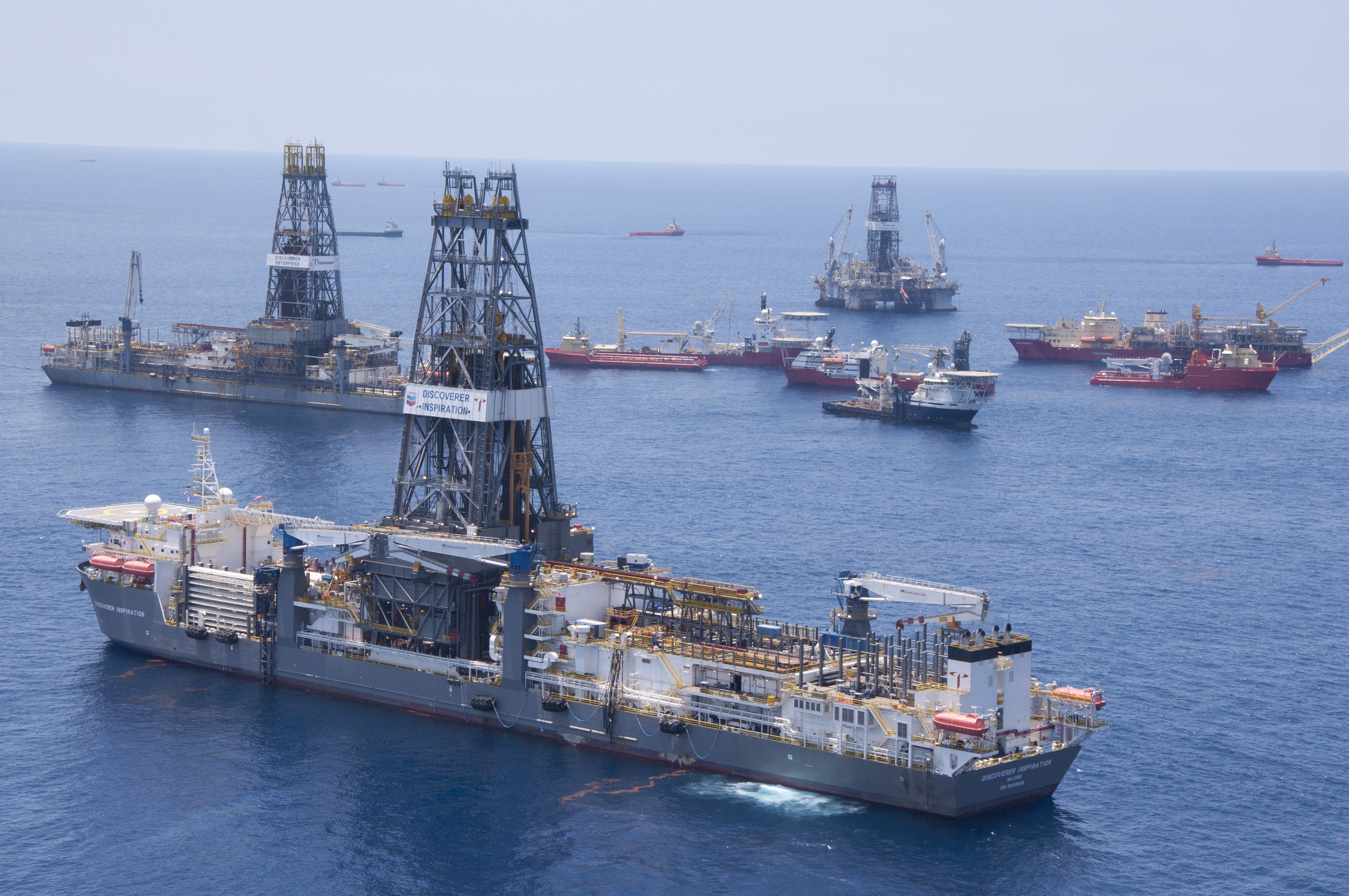
Discoverer Inspiration delivers new containment cap to the Deepwater Horizon oil spill on 10 July 2010. In the background are the Discoverer Enterprise, GSF Development Driller II, and Helix Producer I

== Petroleum drilling industry ==
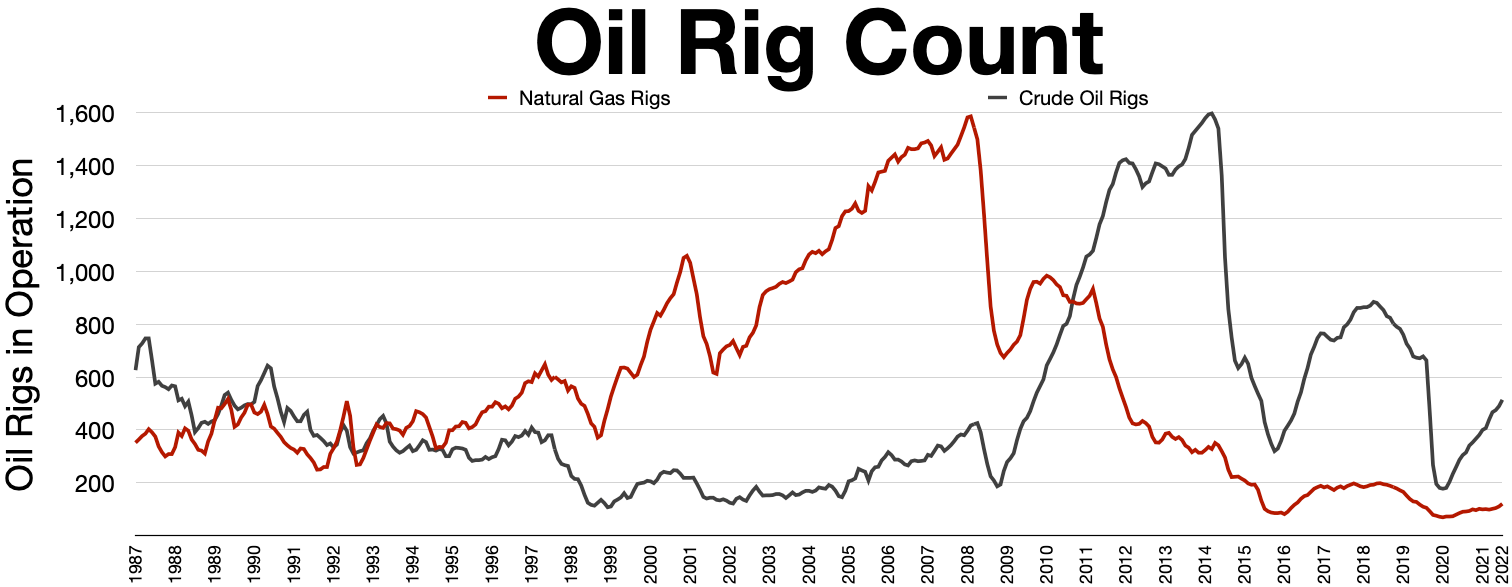
Oil rigs operational Natural gas rigs operational

Oil and natural gas drilling rigs are used not only to identify geologic reservoirs, but also used to create holes that allow the extraction of oil or natural gas from those reservoirs. Primarily in onshore oil and gas fields once a well has been drilled, the drilling rig will be moved off of the well and a service rig (a smaller rig) that is purpose-built for completions will be moved on to the well to get the well on line. This frees up the drilling rig to drill another hole and streamlines the operation as well as allowing for specialization of certain services, i.e. completions vs. drilling.

== Mining drilling industry ==
Mining drilling rigs are used for two main purposes, exploration drilling which aims to identify the location and quality of a mineral, and production drilling, used in the production-cycle for mining. Drilling rigs used for rock blasting for surface mines vary in size dependent on the size of the hole desired, and is typically classified into smaller pre-split and larger production holes. Underground mining (hard rock) uses a variety of drill rigs dependent on the desired purpose, such as production, bolting, cabling, and tunnelling.

== Mobile drilling rigs ==
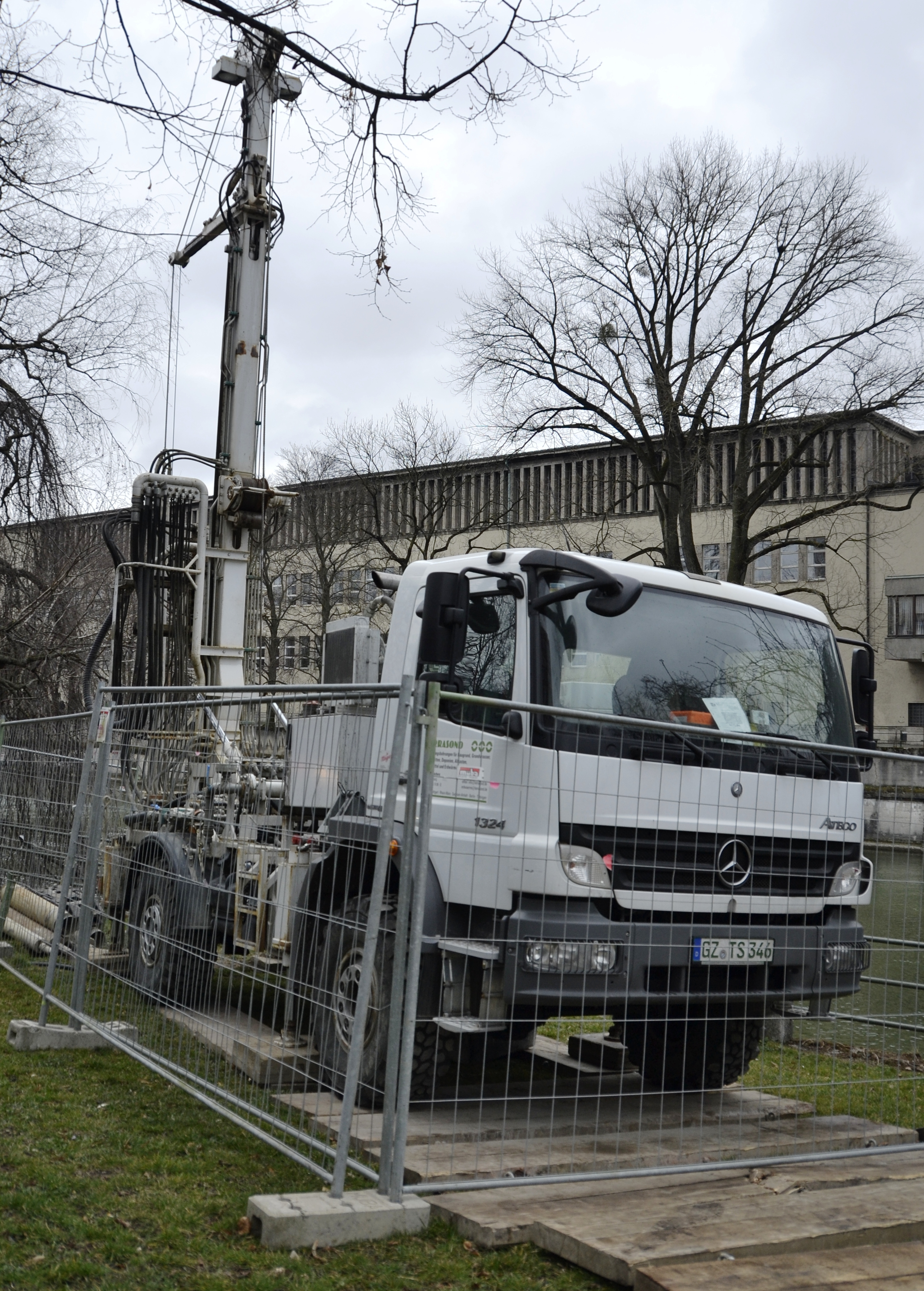
Mobile drilling rig mounted on a truck

In early oil exploration, drilling rigs were semi-permanent in nature and the derricks were often built on site and left in place after the completion of the well. In more recent times drilling rigs are expensive custom-built machines that can be moved from well to well. Some light duty drilling rigs are like a mobile crane and are more usually used to drill water wells. Larger land rigs must be broken apart into sections and loads to move to a new place, a process which can often take weeks.

Small mobile drilling rigs are also used to drill or bore piles. Rigs can range from 100 short tons (91,000 kg) continuous flight auger (CFA) rigs to small air powered rigs used to drill holes in quarries, etc. These rigs use the same technology and equipment as the oil drilling rigs, just on a smaller scale.

The drilling mechanisms outlined below differ mechanically in terms of the machinery used, but also in terms of the method by which drill cuttings are removed from the cutting face of the drill and returned to surface.

== Automated drill rig ==
An automated drill rig (ADR) is an automated full-sized walking land-based drill rig that drills long lateral sections in horizontal wells for the oil and gas industry. ADRs are agile rigs that can move from pad to pad to new well sites faster than other full-sized drilling rigs. Each rig costs about $25 million. ADR is used extensively in the Athabasca oil sands. According to the "Oil Patch Daily News", "Each rig will generate 50,000 man-hours of work during the construction phase and upon completion, each operating rig will directly and indirectly employ more than 100 workers." Compared to conventional drilling rigs", Ensign, an international oilfield services contractor based in Calgary, Alberta, that makes ADRs claims that they are "safer to operate, have "enhanced controls intelligence," "reduced environmental footprint, quick mobility and advanced communications between field and office." In June 2005 the first specifically designed slant automated drilling rig (ADR), Ensign Rig No. 118, for steam assisted gravity drainage (SAGD) applications was mobilized by Deer Creek Energy Limited, a Calgary-based oilsands company.

== Auger drills ==
=== Drill buckets ===
A drill bucket, or auger bucket, is a drilling head that accumulates spoil inside and can be lifted from the hole periodically to be emptied.

== Industry associations ==
The International Association of Drilling Contractors (IADC) is the global trade association representing the drilling industry. Founded in 1940 and headquartered in Houston, Texas, the IADC represents drilling contractors, oil and gas operators, and service companies across more than 50 countries.

The IADC publishes Drilling Contractor, the industry's primary technical magazine covering drilling technology, operations, and safety practices.

The International Association of Oil and Gas Producers (IOGP) is a global industry association representing oil and gas companies and national associations. IOGP collaborates with drilling contractors and service companies to develop industry-wide safety standards, recommended practices, and incident reporting frameworks for upstream operations.

== See also ==
- Boring – Process of enlarging an already-drilled hole with a single-point cutting tool
- Casing cutter – Oil drilling equipment
- Laser drilling – Process of creating thru-holes using laser cutting methods
- List of components of oil drilling rigs
- Enhanced geothermal system – Type of electricity generation system
- Flame jet drill – Technology for rock driling
- Mineral exploration – Finding commercially viable concentrations of minerals to mine.
- Oil platform – Offshore ocean structure with oil drilling and related facilities
- Oil well – Well drilled to extract crude oil and/or gas
- Pumpjack – Drive for a reciprocating piston pump in an oil well
- Subsea technology – Technology of submerged operations in the sea
- Big Stan (drill rig) – Large vehicle mounted drill rig
- Horizontal directional drilling – Method of installing underground utilities
