= List of abbreviations in oil and gas exploration and production =

The oil and gas industry uses many acronyms and abbreviations. This list is meant for indicative purposes only and should not be relied upon for anything but general information.

== # ==
- 1C – Proved contingent resources
- 1oo2 – One out of two voting (instrumentation)
- 1P – Proven reserves
- 2C – Proved and probable contingent resources
- 2D – two-dimensional (geophysics)
- 2oo2 – Two out of two voting (instrumentation)
- 2oo2D – Two out of two voting with additional diagnostic detection capabilities (instrumentation)
- 2oo3 – Two out of three voting (instrumentation)
- 2ooN detection – to reach specified alarm limit when N ≥ 3 (instrumentation)
- 2P – proved and probable reserves
- 3C – three components seismic acquisition (x, y, and z)
- 3C – Proved, probable and possible contingent resources
- 3D – three-dimensional (geophysics)
- 3P – proved, probable and possible reserves
- 4D – multiple 3Ds acquired over time (the 4th D) over the same area with the same parameters (geophysics)
- 8rd – eight round (describes the number of revolutions per inch of pipe thread)

== Symbol ==
- °API – degrees API (American Petroleum Institute) density of oil

== A ==
- A – Appraisal (well)
- AADE – American Association of Drilling Engineers
- AAPG – American Association of Petroleum Geologists
- AAPL – American Association of Professional Landmen
- AAODC – American Association of Oilwell Drilling Contractors (obsolete; superseded by IADC)
- AAV – Annulus access valve
- ABAN – Abandonment, (also as AB and ABD and ABND)
- ABSA – Alberta Boilers Safety Association
- ABT – Annulus bore test
- ACC – Air-cooled heat condenser
- ACHE – Air-cooled heat exchanger
- ACOU – Acoustic
- ACP – Alkali-cosolvent-polymer
- ACQU – Acquisition log
- ACV – Automatic control valve
- ADE – Advanced decision-making environment
- ADEP – Awaiting development with exploration potential, referring to an asset
- ADROC – advanced rock properties report
- ADT – Applied drilling technology, ADT log
- ADM – Advanced diagnostics module (fieldbus)
- AER – Auto excitation regulator
- AEMO – Australian Energy Market Operator
- AFE – Authorization for expenditure, a process of submitting a business proposal to investors
- AFP – Active fire protection
- AGA – American Gas Association
- AGRU – acid gas removal unit
- AGT – (1) agitator, used in drilling
- AGT – (2) authorised gas tester (certified by OPITTO)
- AGT – (3) Azerbaijan – Georgia – Turkey (a region rich in oil related activity)
- AHBDF – along hole (depth) below Derrick floor
- AHD – along hole depth
- AHU – air handling unit
- AICD – autonomous inflow control device
- AIChemE – American Institute of Chemical Engineers
- AIM – asset integrity management
- AIPSM – asset integrity and process safety management
- AIR – assurance interface and risk
- AIRG – airgun
- AIRRE – airgun report
- AISC – American Institute of Steel Construction
- AISI – American Iron and Steel Institute
- AIT – analyzer indicator transmitter
- AIT – array induction tool
- AL – appraisal license (United Kingdom), a type of onshore licence issued before 1996
- ALAP – as low as possible (used along with density of mud)
- ALARP – as low as reasonably practicable
- ALC – vertical seismic profile acoustic log calibration report
- ALLMS – anchor leg load monitoring system
- ALQ – additional living quarters
- ALR – acoustic log report
- ALT – altered
- AM – asset management
- aMDEA – activated methyldiethanolamine
- AMS – auxiliary measurement service log; auxiliary measurement sonde (temperature)
- AMSL – above mean sea level
- AMI – area of mutual interest
- AMV – annulus master valve
- ANACO – analysis of core logs report
- ANARE – analysis report
- ANSI - American National Standards Institute
- AOF – absolute open flow
- AOFP – absolute open-flow potential
- AOI – area of interest
- AOL – arrive on location
- AOR – additional oil recovery
- AP – alkali-polymer
- APD – application for permit to drill
- API – American Petroleum Institute: organization which sets unit standards in the oil and gas industry
- °API – degrees API (gravity of oil)
- APPRE – appraisal report
- APS – active pipe support
- APWD – annular pressure while drilling (tool)
- ARACL – array acoustic log
- ARESV – analysis of reservoir
- ARI – azimuthal resistivity image
- ARRC – array acoustic report
- ART – actuator running tool
- AS – array sonic processing log
- ASD – acoustic sand detection
- ASI – ASI log
- ASME – American Society of Mechanical Engineers
- ASOG – activity-specific operating guidelines
- ASP – array sonic processing report
- ASP – alkali-surfactant-polymer
- ASTM – American Society for Testing and Materials
- ASCSSV – annulus surface controlled sub-surface valve
- ASV – anti-surge valve
- ASV – annular safety valve
- ASV – accommodation and support vessel
- ATD – application to drill
- ATU – auto top-up unit
- AUV – autonomous underwater vehicle
- AV – annular velocity or apparent viscosity
- AVGMS – annulus vent gas monitoring system
- AVO – amplitude versus offset (geophysics)
- AWB/V – annulus wing block/valve (XT)
- AWO – approval for well operation
- ATM – at the moment

== B ==
- B or b – prefix denoting a number in billions
- BA – bottom assembly (of a riser)
- bbl – barrel
- bbl/MMscf – barrels per million standard cubic feet
- BBG – buy back gas
- BBSM – behaviour-based safety management
- BCPD – barrels condensate per day
- Bcf – billion cubic feet (of natural gas)
- Bcf/d – billion cubic feet per day (of natural gas)
- Bcfe – billion cubic feet (of natural gas equivalent)
- BD – bursting disc
- BDF – below derrick floor
- BDL – bit data log
- BDV – blowdown valve
- BGL – borehole geometry log
- BGL – below ground level (used as a datum for depths in a well)
- BGS – British Geological Survey
- BGT – borehole geometry tool
- BGWP – base of ground-water protection
- BH – bloodhound
- BHA – bottom hole assembly (toolstring on coiled tubing or drill pipe)
- BHC – BHC gamma ray log
- BHCA – BHC acoustic log
- BHCS – BHC sonic log
- BHCT – bottomhole circulating temperature
- BHKA – bottomhole kickoff assembly
- BHL – borehole log
- BHP – bottom hole pressure
- BHPRP – borehole pressure report
- BHSRE – bottom hole sampling report
- BHSS – borehole seismic survey
- BHT – bottomhole temperature
- BHTV – borehole television report
- BINXQ – bond index quicklook log
- BIOR – biostratigraphic range log
- BIORE – biostratigraphy study report
- BSLM – bend stiffener latch mechanism
- BSW – base sediment and water
- BIVDL – BI/DK/WF/casing collar locator/gamma ray log
- BLAT - BOP landing assist tool
- BLD – bailed (refers to the practice of removing debris from the hole with a cylindrical container on a wireline)
- BLI – bottom of logging interval
- BLP – bridge-linked platform
- BO – back-off log
- BO – barrel of oil
- boe – barrels of oil equivalent
- boed – barrels of oil equivalent per day
- BOEM – Bureau of Ocean Energy Management
- boepd – barrels of oil equivalent per day
- BOB – back on bottom
- BOD – biological oxygen demand
- BOL – bill of lading
- BOM – bill of materials
- BOP – blowout preventer
- BOP – bottom of pipe
- BOPD – barrels of oil per day
- BOPE – blowout prevention equipment
- BOREH – borehole seismic analysis
- BOSIET – basic offshore safety induction and emergency training
- BOTHL – bottom hole locator log
- BOTTO – bottom hole pressure/temperature report
- BP – bridge plug
- BPD – barrels per day
- BPH – barrels per hour
- BPFL – borehole profile log
- BPLUG – baker plug
- BPM – barrels per minute
- BPV – back pressure valve (goes on the end of coiled tubing a drill pipe tool strings to prevent fluid flow in the wrong direction)
- BQL – B/QL log
- BRPLG – bridge plug log
- BRT – below rotary table (used as a datum for depths in a well)
- BS – bend stiffener
- BS – bumper sub
- BS – booster station
- BSEE – US: Bureau of Safety and Environmental Enforcement (formerly the MMS)
- BSG – black start generator
- BSR – blind shear rams (blowout preventer)
- BSML – below sea mean level
- BS&W – basic sediments and water
- BT – buoyancy tank
- BTEX – benzene, toluene, ethyl-benzene and xylene
- BTHL – bottom hole log
- BTO/C – break to open/close (valve torque)
- BTU – British thermal units
- BTU – Board of Trade Unit (1 kWh) (historical)
- BU – bottom up
- BUL – bottom-up lag
- BUR – build-up rate
- BVO – ball valve operator
- bwd – barrels of water per day (often used in reference to oil production)
- bwipd – barrels of water injected per day
- bwpd – barrels of water per day

== C ==
- C – completion (downhole equipment in a finished well)
- C&E – well completion and equipment cost
- C&S – cased and suspended
- C1 – methane
- C2 – ethane
- C3 – propane
- C4 – butane
- C5 – pentanes
- C6 – hexanes
- C7+ – heavy hydrocarbon components
- CA – core analysis log
- CAAF – contract authorization approval form
- CalGEM – California Geologic Energy Management Division (oil & gas regulatory body)
- CALI – caliper log
- CALOG – circumferential acoustic log
- CALVE – calibrated velocity log data
- CAODC – Canadian Association of Oilwell Drilling Contractors
- CAPP – Canadian Association of Petroleum Producers
- CAR – Company Appointed Representative
- CART – cam-actuated running tool (housing running tool)
- CART – cap replacement tool
- CAS – casing log
- CAT – connector actuating tool
- CB – casing bowl
- CB – core barrel
- CBF – casing bowl flange
- CBIL – CBIL log
- CBL – cement bond log (measurement of casing cement integrity)
- CBM – choke bridge module – XT choke
- CBM – conventional buoy mooring
- CBM – coal-bed methane
- CCHT – core chart log
- CCL – casing collar locator (in perforation or completion operations, the tool provides depths by correlation of the casing string's magnetic anomaly with known casing features)
- CCLBD – construction / commissioning logic block diagram
- CCLP – casing collar locator perforation
- CCLTP – casing collar locator through tubing plug
- CD – core description
- CDATA – core data
- CDIS – CDI synthetic seismic log
- CDU – control distribution unit
- CDU – crude distillation unit
- CDP – common depth point (geophysics)
- CDP – comprehensive drilling plan
- CDRCL – compensated dual resistivity cal. log
- CDF – core contaminated by drilling fluid
- CDFT – critical device function test
- CE – CE log
- CEC – cation-exchange capacity
- CECAN – CEC analysis
- CEME – cement evaluation
- CEOR – chemical-enhanced oil recovery
- CER – central electrical/equipment room
- CERE – cement remedial log
- CET – cement evaluation tool
- CF – completion fluid
- CF – casing flange
- CFD – computational fluid dynamics
- CFGPD – cubic feet of gas per day
- CFU – compact flotation unit
- CGEL – CG EL log
- CGL – core gamma log
- CGPA – Canadian Gas Processors Association
- CGPH – core graph log
- CGR – condensate gas ratio
- CGTL – compact gas to liquids (production equipment small enough to fit on a ship)
- CHCNC – CHCNC gamma ray casing collar locator
- CHDTP – calliper HDT playback log
- CHECK – checkshot and acoustic calibration report
- CHESM – contractor, health, environment and safety management
- CHF – casing head flange
- CHK – choke (a restriction in a flowline or a system, usually referring to a production choke during a test or the choke in the well control system)
- CHKSR – checkshot survey report
- CHKSS – checkshot survey log
- CHOPS – cold heavy oil production with sand
- CHP – casing hanger pressure (pressure in an annulus as measured at the casing hanger)
- CHOTO – commissioning, handover and takeover
- CHROM – chromatolog
- CHRT – casing hanger running tool
- CIBP – cast iron bridge plug
- CICR – cast iron cement retainer
- CIDL – chemical injection downhole lower
- CIDU – chemical injection downhole upper
- CIL – chemical injection line
- CILD – conduction log
- CIMV – chemical injection metering valve
- CIRC – circulation
- CITHP – closed-in tubing head pressure (tubing head pressure when the well is shut in)
- CIV – chemical injection valve
- CK – choke (a restriction in a flowline or a system, usually referring to a production choke during a test or the choke in the well control system)
- CL – core log
- CLG – core log and graph
- CM – choke module
- CMC – crown mounted compensators
- CMC – critical micelle concentration
- CMP – common midpoint (geophysics)
- CMR – combinable magnetic resonance (NMR log tool)
- CMT – cement
- CNA – clay, no analysis
- CND – compensated neutron density
- CNFDP – CNFD true vertical-depth playback log
- CNGR – compensated neutron gamma-ray log
- CNL – compensated neutron log
- CNLFD – CNL/FDC log
- CNS – Central North Sea
- CNCF – field-normalised compensated neutron porosity
- CNR – Canadian natural resources
- CO – change out (ex. from rod equipment to casing equipment)
- COA – conditions of approval
- COC – certificate of conformance
- COD – chemical oxygen demand
- COL – collar log
- COMAN – compositional analysis
- COML – compaction log
- COMP – composite log
- COMPR – completion program report
- COMPU – computest report
- COMRE – completion record log
- COND – condensate production
- CONDE – condensate analysis report
- CONDR – continuous directional log
- CORAN – core analysis report
- CORE – core report
- CORG – corgun log
- CORIB – CORIBAND log
- CORLG – correlation log
- COROR – core orientation report
- COW – Control of Work
- COXY – carbon/oxygen log
- CP – cathodic protection
- CP – crown plug
- cP – centipoise (viscosity unit of measurement)
- CPI separator – corrugated plate interceptor
- CPI – computer-processed interpretation
- CPI – corrugated plate interceptor
- CPICB – computer-processed interpretation coriband log
- CPIRE – computer-processed interpretation report
- CPP – central processing platform
- CRA – corrosion-resistant alloy
- CRET – cement retainer setting log
- CRI – cuttings reinjection
- CRINE – cost reduction in the new era
- CRP – control riser platform
- CRP – common/central reference point (subsea survey)
- CRT – clamp replacement tool
- CRT – casing running tool
- CSE – confined space entry
- CsF – caesium formate
- CSC – car seal closed
- CSG – coal seam gas
- csg – casing
- CSHN – cased-hole neutron log
- CSI – combinable seismic imager (VSP) log (Schlumberger)
- CSMT – core sampler tester log
- CSO – complete seal-off
- CSO – car seal open
- CSPG – Canadian Society of Petroleum Geologists
- CSR – corporate social responsibility
- CST – chronological sample taker log (Schlumberger)
- CSTAK – core sample taken log
- CSTR – continuously stirred tank reactor
- CSTRE – CST report
- CSU – commissioning and start-up
- CSU – construction safety unit
- CSUG – Canadian Society for Unconventional Gas
- CT – coiled tubing
- CTD – coiled tubing drilling
- CTCO – coiled tubing clean-out
- CTLF – coiled tubing lift frame
- CTLF – compensated tension lift frame
- CTOD – crack tip opening displacement
- CTP – commissioning test procedure
- CTR – Critical Transport Rate
- CTRAC – cement tracer log
- CUI – corrosion under insulation
- CUL – cross-unit lateral
- CUT – cutter log
- CUTTD – cuttings description report
- CWOP – complete well on paper
- CWOR – completion work over riser
- CWR – cooling water return
- CWS – cooling water supply
- X/O – cross-over
- CYBD – Cyberbond log
- CYBLK – Cyberlook log
- CYDIP – Cyberdip log
- CYDN – Cyberdon log
- CYPRO – Cyberproducts log
- CVD – Cost versus Depth
- CVX – Chevron

== D ==
- D – development
- D – Darcy, unit of permeability
- D&A – dry and abandoned
- D&C – drilling and completions
- D&I – direction and inclination (MWD borehole deviation survey)
- DAC – dipole acoustic log
- DARCI – Darci log
- DAS – data acquisition system
- DAT – wellhead housing drill-ahead tool
- DAZD – dip and azimuth display
- DBB – double block and bleed
- DBP – drillable bridge plug
- DBR – damaged beyond repair
- DCA – decline curve analysis
- DC – drill centre
- DC – drill collar/collars
- DCAL – dual caliper log
- DCC – distance cross course
- DCS – distributed control system
- DD – directional driller or directional drilling
- DDC – daily drilling cost
- DDC – de-watering and drying contract
- DDBHC – DDBHC waveform log
- DDET – depth determination log
- DDM – derrick drilling machine (a.k.a. top drive)
- DDNL – dual det. neutron life log
- DDPT – drill data plot log
- DDPU – double drum pulling unit
- DDR – daily drilling report
- DEA – diethanolamine
- DECC – Department for Energy and Climate Change (UK)
- DECT – decay time
- DECT – down-hole electric cutting tool
- DEFSU – definitive survey report
- DEH – direct electrical heating
- DELTA – delta-T log
- DEN – density log
- DEPAN – deposit analysis report
- DEPC – depth control log
- DEPT – depth
- DESFL – deep induction SFL log
- DEV – development well, Lahee classification
- DEVLG – deviation log
- DEXP – D-exponent log
- DF – derrick floor
- DFI – design, fabrication and installation résumé
- DFIT – diagnostic fracture injection test
- DFPH – Barrels of fluid per hour
- DFR – drilling factual report
- DG/DG# – diesel generator ('#'- means identification letter or number of the equipment i.e. DG3 or DG#3 means diesel generator nr 3)
- DGA – diglycoamine
- DGDS – dual-gradient drilling systems
- DGP – dynamic geohistory plot (3D technique)
- DH – drilling history
- DHC – depositional history curve
- DHSV – downhole safety valve
- DHPG – downhole pressure gauge
- DHPTT – downhole pressure/temperature transducer
- DIBHC – DIS BHC log
- DIEGR – dielectric gamma ray log
- DIF – drill in fluids
- DIL – dual-induction log
- DILB – dual-induction BHC log
- DILL – dual-induction laterolog
- DILLS – dual-induction log-LSS
- DILSL – dual-induction log-SLS
- DIM – directional inertia mechanism
- DINT – dip interpretation
- DIP – dipmeter log
- DIPAR – dipole acoustic report
- DIPBH – dipmeter borehole log
- DIPFT – dipmeter fast log
- DIPLP – dip lithology pressure log
- DIPRE – dipmeter report
- DIPRM – dip removal log
- DIPSA – dipmeter soda log
- DIPSK – dipmeter stick log
- DIRS – directional survey log
- DIRSU – directional survey report
- DIS – DIS-SLS log
- DISFL – DISFL DBHC gamma ray log
- DISO – dual induction sonic log
- DL – development license (United Kingdom), a type of onshore license issued before 1996
- DLIST – dip-list log
- DLL – dual laterolog (deep and shallow resistivity)
- DLS – dog-leg severity (directional drilling)
- DM – dry mate
- DMA – dead-man anchor
- DMAS – dead-man auto-shear DMAS
- DMRP – density – magnetic resonance porosity (wireline tool)
- DMT – down-hole monitoring tool
- DNHO – down-hole logging
- DNV – Det Norske Veritas
- DOA – delegation of authority
- DOE – Department of Energy, United States
- DOGGR – Division of Oil, Gas, and Geothermal Resources (former name of California's regulatory entity for oil, gas, and geothermal production)
- DOPH – drilled-out plugged hole
- DOWRE – downhole report
- DP – drill pipe
- DP – dynamic positioning
- DPDV – dynamically positioned drilling vessel
- DPL – dual propagation log
- DPLD – differential pressure levitated device (or vehicle)
- DPRES – dual propagation resistivity log
- DPT – deeper pool test, Lahee classification
- DQLC – dipmeter quality control log
- DR – dummy-run log
- DR – drilling report
- DRI – drift log
- DRL – drilling
- DRLCT – drilling chart
- DRLOG – drilling log
- DRLPR – drilling proposal/progress report
- DRO – discovered resources opportunities
- DRPG – drilling program report
- DRPRS – drilling pressure
- DRREP – drilling report
- DRYRE – drying report
- DS – deviation survey, (also directional system)
- DSA – Double Studded Adapter
- DSCAN – DSC analysis report
- DSI – dipole shear imager
- DSL – digital spectralog (western atlas)
- DSPT – cross-plots log
- DST – drill-stem test
- DSTG – DSTG log
- DSTL – drill-stem test log
- DSTND – dual-space thermal neutron density log
- DSTPB – drill-stem test true vertical depth playback log
- DSTR – drill-stem test report
- DSTRE – drill-stem test report
- DSTSM – drill-stem test summary report
- DSTW – drill-stem test job report/works
- DSU – drill spacing unit
- DSV – diving support vessel or drilling supervisor
- DTI – Department of Trade and Industry (UK) (obsolete; superseded by dBERR, which was then superseded by DECC)
- DTPB – CNT true vertical-depth playback log
- DTT – depth to time
- DUC – drilled but uncompleted wells
- DVD – Depth versus Day
- DVT – differential valve tool (for cementing multiple stages)
- DWOP – drilling well on paper (a theoretical exercise conducted involving the service-provider managers)
- DWQL – dual-water quicklook log
- DWSS – dig-well seismic surface log
- DXC – DXC pressure pilot report

== E ==
- E – exploration
- E&A – exploration and appraisal
- E&I – electrical and instrumentation
- E&P – exploration and production, another name for the upstream sector
- EA – exploration asset
- EAGE – European Association of Geoscientists and Engineers
- ECA – Easington Catchment Area
- ECD – equivalent circulating density
- EDG/EDGE – emergency diesel generator
- ECMS – electrical control and monitoring system
- ECMWF – European Centre for Medium-Range Weather Forecasts
- ECP – external casing packer
- ECRD – electrically controlled release device (for abandoning stuck wireline tool from cable)
- ECT – external cantilevered turret
- EDG – Emergency Diesel Generator
- EDP – exploration drilling program report
- EDP – emergency disconnect pPackage
- EDP – emergency depressurisation
- EDPHOT – emergency drill pipe hang-off tool
- EDR – exploration drilling report
- EDR – electronic drilling recorder
- EDS – emergency disconnection sequence
- EEAR – emergency electrical auto restart
- EEHA – electrical equipment for hazardous areas (IECEx)
- EFL – electrical flying lead
- EFR – engineering factual report
- EHT – electric heat trace
- EGBE – ethylene glycol monobutyl ether (2-butoxyethanol)
- EGMBE – ethylene glycol monobutyl ether
- EHU – electro-hydraulic unit
- EIA – environmental impact assessment
- EI – Energy Institute
- ELEC TECH – electronics technician
- ELT – economic limit test
- EL – electric log
- EM – EMOP log
- EMCS – energy management and control systems
- EMD – equivalent mud density
- EMG – equivalent mud gradient
- EMOP – EMOP well site processing log
- EMP – electromagnetic propagation log
- EMR – electronic memory read-out
- EMS – environment measurement sonde (wireline multi-caliper)
- EMW – equivalent mud weight
- EN PI – enhanced productivity index log
- ENG – engineering log
- ENGF – engineer factual report
- ENGPD – engineering porosity data
- Eni – Ente Nazionale Idrocarburi S.p.A. (Italy)
- ENJ – enerjet log
- ENMCS – electrical network monitoring and control system
- EODU – electrical and optical distribution unit
- EOFL – end of field life
- EOR – enhanced oil recovery
- EOT – end of tubing
- EOT – electric overhead travelling
- ELV – extra-low voltage
- EOW – end-of-well report
- EPCM/I – engineering procurement construction and management/installation
- EPCU – electrical power conditioning unit
- EPIDORIS – exploration and production integrated drilling operations and reservoir information system
- EPL – EPL log
- EPLG – epilog
- EPLPC – EPL-PCD-SGR log
- EPS – early production system
- EPT – electromagnetic propagation
- EPU – electrical power unit
- EPTNG – EPT-NGT log
- EPV – early production vessel
- ER(D) – extended reach (drilling)
- ERT – emergency response training; electrical resistivity tomography
- ESD – emergency shutdown
- ESD – equivalent static density
- ESDV – emergency shutdown valve
- ESHIA – environmental, social and health impact assessment
- ESIA – environmental and social impact assessment
- ESP – electric submersible pump
- ETAP – Eastern Trough Area Project
- ETD – external turret disconnectable
- ETECH – electronics technician
- ETTD – electromagnetic thickness test
- ETU – electrical test unit
- EUE – external-upset-end (tubing connection)
- EUR – estimated ultimate recovery
- EVARE – evaluation report
- EWMP – earthworks/electrical works/excavation works management plan
- EWR – end-of-well report
- EXL – or XL, exploration licence (United Kingdom), a type of onshore licence issued between the first onshore licensing round (1986) and the sixth (1992)
- EXP – exposed
- EZSV – easy sliding valve (drillable packer plug)

== F ==
- F&G – fire and gas
- FAC – factual report
- FAC – first aid case
- FACHV – four-arm calliper log
- FANAL – formation analysis sheet log
- FANG – friction angle
- FAR – field auxiliary room
- FAT – factory acceptance testing
- FB – full bore
- FBE – fusion-bonded epoxy
- FBHP – flowing bottom-hole pressure
- FBHT – flowing bottom-hole temperature
- FC – float collar
- FC – fail closed (valve or damper)
- FCGT – flood clean gauge test
- FCM – flow control module
- FCP – final circulating pressure
- FCV – flow control valve
- FCVE – F-curve log
- FDC – formation density log
- FDF – forced-draft fan
- FDP – field development plan
- FDS – functional design specification
- FDT – fractional dead time
- FEED – front-end engineering design
- FEL – from east line
- FER – field equipment room
- FER – formation evaluation report
- FEWD – formation evaluation while drilling
- FFAC – formation factor log
- FFM – full field model
- FG – fiberglass
- FGHT – flood gauge hydrotest
- FRP – fiberglass reinforced plastics
- FGEOL – final geological report
- FH – full-hole tool joint
- FI – final inspection
- FID – final investment decision
- FID – flame ionisation detection
- FIH – finish in hole (tripping pipe)
- FIL – FIL log
- FI(M) – free issue (materials)
- FINST – final stratigraphic report
- FINTP – formation interpretation
- FIP – flow-induced pulsation
- FIT – fairing intervention tool
- FIT – fluid identification test
- FIT – formation integrity test
- FIT – formation interval tester
- FIT – flow indicator transmitter
- FIV – flow-induced vibration
- FIV – formation isolation valve
- FJC – field joint coating
- FL – F log
- FL – fail locked (valve or damper)
- FL – fluid level
- FLAP –fluid level above pump
- FLB – field logistics base
- FLDF – flying lead deployment frame
- FLIV – flowline injection valve
- FLIV – flowline isolation valve
- FLET – flowline end termination
  - aFLET – actuated flowline end termination
- FLNG – floating liquefied natural gas
- FLOG – FLOG PHIX RHGX log
- FLOPR – flow profile report
- FLOT – flying lead orientation tool
- FLOW – flow and buildup test report
- FLRA – field-level risk assessment
- FLS – fluid sample
- FLT – fault (geology)
- FLT – flying lead termination
- FLTC – fail locked tending to close
- FLTO – fail locked tending to open
- FMD – flooded member detection
- FMEA – failure modes, & effects analysis
- FMECA – failure modes, effects, and criticality analysis
- FMI – formation micro imaging log (azimuthal microresistivity)
- FMP – formation microscan report
- FMP – Field Management Plan
- FMS – formation multi-scan log; formation micro-scan log
- FMS – flush-mounted slips
- FMT – flow management tool
- FMTAN – FMT analysis report
- FNL – from north line
- FO – fail open (valve or damper)
- FOBOT – fibre optic breakout tray
- FOET – further offshore emergency training
- FOF – face of flange
- FOH – finish out of hole (tripping pipe)
- FOSA – field operating services agreement
- FOSV – full-opening safety valve
- FPDM – fracture potential and domain modelling/mapping
- FPH – feet per hour
- FPIT – free-point indicator tool
- FPL – flow analysis log
- FPLP – freshman petroleum learning program (Penn State)
- FPLAN – field plan log
- FPS – field production system
- FPO – floating production and offloading – vessel with no or very limited (process only) on-board produced fluid storage capacity.
- FPSO – floating production storage and offloading vessel
- FPU – floating processing unit
- FRA – fracture log
- FRARE – fracture report
- FRES – final reserve report
- FS – fail safe
- FSB – flowline support base
- FSI – flawless start-up initiative
- FSL – from south line
- FSLT – flexible sealine lifting tool
- FSO – floating storage offloading vessel
- FSR – facility status report
- FSU – floating storage unit
- FT – formation tester log
- FTHP – Flowing Tubing Head Pressure
- FTL – field team leader
- FTM – fire-team member
- FTP – first tranche petroleum
- FTP – field terminal platform
- FTR – function test report
- FTRE – formation testing report
- FULDI – full diameter study report
- FV – funnel viscosity
- FV – float valve
- FVF – formation volume factor
- FWHP – flowing well-head pressure
- FWKO – free water knock-out
- FWL – free water level
- FWL – from West line
- FWR – final well report
- FWV – flow wing valve (also known as production wing valve on a christmas tree)
- FR – flow rate

== G ==
- G/C – gas condensate
- GC – gathering center
- G&P – gathering and processing
- G&T – gathering and transportation
- GALT – gross air leak test
- GAS – gas log
- GASAN – gas analysis report
- GBS – gravity-based structure
- GBT – gravity base tank
- GC – Gauge Cutter
- GCB – generator circuit breaker
- GCLOG – graphic core log
- GCT – GCT log
- GDAT – geodetic datum
- GDE – gross depositional environment
- GDIP – geodip log
- GDT – gas down to
- GE – condensate gas equivalent
- GE – ground elevation (also GR, or GRE)
- GEOCH – geochemical evaluation
- GEODY – GEO DYS log
- GEOEV – geochemical evaluation report
- GEOFO – geological and formation evaluation report
- GEOL – geological surveillance log
- GEOP – geophone data log
- GEOPN – geological well prognosis report
- GEOPR – geological operations progress report
- GEORE – geological report
- GGRG – gauge ring
- GIIP – gas initially in place
- GIH – go in hole
- GIP – gas in place
- GIS – geographic information system
- GL – gas lift
- GL – ground level
- GLE – ground level elevation (generally in metres above mean sea level)
- GLM – gas lift mandrel (alternative name for side pocket mandrel)
- GLR – gas-liquid ratio
- GLT – GLT log
- GLV – gas lift valve
- GLW –
- GM – gas migration
- GOC – gas oil contact
- GOM – Gulf of Mexico
- GOP – geological operations report
- GOR – gas oil ratio
- GOSP – gas/oil separation plant
- GPIT – general-purpose inclinometry tool (borehole survey)
- GPLT – geol plot log
- GPTG – gallons per thousand gallons
- GPM – gallons per Mcf
- GPSL – geo pressure log
- GR – ground level
- GR – gamma ray
- GR – gauge ring (measure hole size)
- GRAD – gradiometer log
- GRE – ground elevation
- GRLOG – grapholog
- GRN – gamma ray neutron log
- GRP – glass-reinforced plastic
- GRV – gross rock volume
- GRSVY – gradient survey log
- GS – gas supplier
- GS – gel strength
- GST – GST log
- GTC/G –gas turbine compressor/generator
- GTL – gas to liquids
- GTW – gas to wire
- GUN – gun set log
- GWC – gas-water contact
- GWR – guided wave radar
- GWREP – geo well report

== H ==
- HAT – highest astronomical tide
- HAZ – heat-affected zone
- HAZID – hazard identification (meeting)
- HAZOP – hazard and operability study (meeting)
- HBE – high-build epoxy
- HBP – held by production
- HC – hydrocarbons
- HCAL – HRCC caliper (in logs)(in inches)
- HCCS – horizontal clamp connection system
- HCM – horizontal connection module (to connect the christmas tree to the manifold)
- HCS – high-capacity square mesh screens
- HD – head
- HDA – helideck assistant
- HDD – horizontal directional drilling
- HDPE – high-density polyethylene
- HDT – high-resolution dipmeter log
- HDU – horizontal drive unit
- HEXT – hex diplog
- HFE – human factors engineering
- HFL – hydraulic flying lead
- HGO – heavy gas oil
- HGS – high (wpecific-)gravity solids
- HH – horse head (on pumping unit)
- HHP – hydraulic horsepower
- HI – hydrogen index
- HiPAP – high-precision acoustic positioning
- HIPPS – high-integrity pressure protection system
- HIRA – hazard identification and risk assessment
- HISC – hydrogen-induced stress cracking
- HKLD – hook load
- HL – hook load
- HLCV – heavy-lift crane vessel
- HLO – heavy load-out (facility)
- HLO – helicopter landing officer
- Hmax – maximum wave height
- HNGS – flasked hostile natural gamma-ray spectrometry tool
- HO – hole opener
- HOB – hang on bridle (cable assembly)
- HMR – heating medium return
- HMS – heating medium supply; hydraulic multipacker system
- HP – hydrostatic pressure
- HPAM – partially hydrolyzed polyacrylamide
- HPGAG – high-pressure gauge
- HPHT – high-pressure high-temperature
- HPPS – HP pressure log
- HPU – hydraulic power unit
- HPWBM – high-performance water-based mud
- HRCC – HCAl of caliper (in inches)
- HRLA – high-resolution laterolog array (resistivity logging tool)
- HRF – hyperbaric rescue facility/vessel
- HRSG – heat recovery steam generator
- Hs – significant wave height
- HSE – health, safety and environment or Health & Safety Executive (United Kingdom)
- HSV – hyperbaric support vessel
- HTHP – high-temperature high pressure
- HTM – helideck team member
- HVDC – high voltage direct current
- HWDP – heavy-weight drill pipe (sometimes spelled hevi-wate)
- HUD – hold-up depth
- HUN – hold-up nipple
- HUET – helicopter underwater escape training
- HVAC – heating, ventilation and air-conditioning
- HWDP – heavy weight drill pipe
- HYPJ – hyperjet
- HYROP – hydrophone log

== I ==
- I:P – injector to producer ratio
- IADC – International Association of Drilling Contractors
- IAT – internal active turret
- IBC – intermediate bulk container
- IC – instrument cable
- ICoTA – Intervention and Coiled Tubing Association
- ICC – isolation confirmation (or control) certificate
- ICD – inflow control device
- ICEX;IECEx – international electrotechnical commission system for certification to standards relating to equipment for use in explosive atmospheres (EEHA)
- ICP – initial circulating pressure
- ICP – intermediate casing point
- ICP – inductively coupled plasma
- ICSS – integrated controls and safety system
- ICSU – integrated commissioning and start-up
- ICV – interval control valve
- ICV – integrated cement volume (of borehole)
- ICW – incomplete work
- ID – inner or internal diameter (of a tubular component such as a casing)
- IDC – intangible drilling costs
- IDEL – IDEL log
- IEB – induction electro BHC log
- IEL – induction electrical log
- IF – internal flush tool joint
- iFLS – intelligent fast load shedding
- IFP – French Institute of Petroleum (Institut Français du Petrole)
- IFT – interfacial tension
- IGPE – immersion grade phenolic epoxy
- IGV – inlet guide vane
- IH – gamma ray log
- IHEC – isolation of hazardous energy certificate
- IHUC – installation, hook-up and commissioning
- IHV – integrated hole volume (of borehole)
- IIC – infield installation contractor
- IJL – injection log
- IL – induction log
- ILI – inline inspection (intelligent pigging)
- ILOGS – image logs
- ILT – inline tee
- IMAG – image analysis report
- IMCA – International Marine Contractors Association
- IMPP – injection-molded polypropylene coating system
- IMR – inspection, maintenance, and repair
- INCR – incline report
- INCRE – incline report
- INDRS – IND RES sonic log
- INDT – INDT log
- INDWE – individual well record report
- INJEC – injection falloff log
- INS – insufficient sample
- INS – integrated navigation system
- INSUR – inrun survey report
- INVES – investigative program report
- IOC – international oil company
- IOM – installation, operation and maintenance manual
- IOS – internal olefin sulfonate
- IOS – isomerized olefin sulfonate
- IP – ingress protection
- IP – Institute of Petroleum, now Energy Institute
- IP – intermediate pressure
- IPAA – Independent Petroleum Association of America
- IPC – installed production capacity
- IPLS – IPLS log
- IPR – inflow performance relationship
- IPT – internal passive turret
- IR – interpretation report
- IRC – inspection release certificate
- IRDV – intelligent remote dual valve
- IRTJ – IRTJ gamma ray slimhole log
- ISD – instrument-securing device
- ISF – ISF sonic log
- ISFBG – ISF BHC GR log
- ISFCD – ISF conductivity log
- ISFGR – ISF GR casing collar locator log
- ISFL – ISF-LSS log
- ISFP – ISF sonic true vertical depth playback log
- ISFPB – ISF true vertical depth playback log
- ISFSL – ISF SLS MSFL log
- ISIP – initial shut-in pressure
- ISSOW – integrated safe system of work
- ISV – infield support vessel
- ITD – internal turret disconnectable
- ITO – inquiry to order
- ITR – inspection test record
- ITS – influx to surface
- ITT – internal testing tool (for BOP test)
- IUG – instrument utility gas
- IWCF – International Well Control Federation
- IWOCS – installation/workover control system
- IWTT – interwell tracer test

== J ==
- J&A – junked and abandoned
- JB – junk basket
- JHA – job hazard analysis
- JIB – joint-interest billing
- JLT – J-lay tower
- JSA – job safety analysis
- JT – Joule-Thomson (effect/valve/separator)
- JTS – joints
- JU – jack-up drilling rig
- JV – joint venture
- JVP – joint venture partners/participants

== K ==
- KB – kelly bushing
- KBE – kelly bushing elevation (in meters above sea level, or meters above ground level)
- KBG – kelly bushing height above ground level
- KBUG – kelly bushing underground (drilling up in coal mines, West Virginia, Baker & Taylor drilling)
- KCI – potassium chloride
- KD – kelly down
- KMW – kill mud weight
- KOEBD – gas converted to oil-equivalent at 6 million cubic feet = 1 thousand barrels
- KOH – potassium hydroxide
- KOP – kick-off point (directional drilling)
- KOP – kick-off plug
- KP – kilometre post
- KRP – kill rate pressure
- KT – kill truck
- KLPD- kiloliters per day

== L ==
- LACT – lease automatic custody transfer
- LAH – lookahead
- LAOT – linear activation override tool
- LARS – launch and recovery system
- LAS – Log ASCII standard
- LAT – lowest astronomical tide
- LBL – long baseline (acoustics)
- LC – locked closed
- LCM – lost circulation material
- LCNLG – LDT CNL gamma ray log
- LCR – local control room
- LCV – level control valve
- L/D – lay down (such as tubing or rods)
- LD – lay down (such as tubing or rods)
- LDAR – leak detection and repair
- LDHI – low-dosage hydrate inhibitor
- LDL – litho density log
- LDS – leak detection system (pipeline monitoring)
- LDTEP – LDT EPT gamma ray log
- LEAKL – leak detection log
- LEPRE – litho-elastic property report
- LER – lands eligible for remining or land equivalent ratio
- LER – Local Equipment Room
- LGO – Light Gas Oil
- LGR – Liquid Gas Ratio
- LGS – Low (specific-)Gravity Solids
- LHT- Left Hand Turn
- LIC – License
- LIB – Lead Impression Block
- LINCO – Liner and Completion Progress Report
- LIOG – Lithography Log
- LIT – Lead Impression Tool
- LIT – level indicator transmitter
- LITDE – Litho Density Quicklook Log
- LITHR – Lithological Description Report
- LITRE – Lithostratigraphy Report
- LITST – Lithostratigraphic Log
- LKO – Lowest Known Oil
- LL – Laterolog
- LMAP – Location Map
- LMRP – Lower Marine Riser Package
- LMTD – Log Mean Temperature Difference
- LMV – Lower Master Valve (on a Xmas tree)
- LNG – Liquefied Natural Gas
- LO – Locked Open
- LOA – Letter of Authorisation/Agreement/Authority
- LOD – Lines of Defence
- LOE – Lease Operating Expenses
- LOGGN – Logging Whilst Drilling
- LOGGS – Lincolnshire Offshore Gas Gathering System
- LOGRS – Log Restoration Report
- LOGSM – Log Sample
- LOK – Low Permeability
- LOKG – Low Permeability Gas
- LOKO – Low Permeability Oil
- LOLER – Lifting Operations and Lifting Equipment Regulations
- LOPA – Layers of protection analysis IEC 61511
- LOT – Leak-Off Test
- LOT – Linear Override Tool
- LOT – Lock Open Tool
- LOTO – Lock Out / Tag Out
- LP – Low Pressure
- LPG – Liquefied Petroleum Gas
- LPH – Litres Per Hour
- LPWHH – Low Pressure Well Head Housing
- LQ – Living Quarters
- LRA – Lower Riser Assembly
- LRG – Liquified Refinery Gas
- LRP – Lower Riser Package
- LS - Long String
- LSBGR – Long Spacing BHC GR Log
- LSD – Land Surface Datum
- LSP – Life Support Package
- LSSON – Long Spacing Sonic Log
- LT – Linear Time or Lag Time
- LTA - Land Treatment Area
- L&T – Load and Test
- LTC – Long Thread and Coupled
- LT&C – Long Thread and Coupled
- LTHCP – Lower Tubing Hanger Crown Plug
- LTI(FR) – Lost Time Incident (Frequency Rate)
- LTP – liner shaker, tensile bolting cloth, perforated panel backing
- LTX – Low temperature extraction unit
- LUMI – Luminescence Log
- LUN – Livening Up Notice
- LVEL – Linear Velocity Log
- LVOT – Linear Valve Override Tool
- LWD – Logging While Drilling
- LWOL – Last Well on Lease
- LWOP – Logging Well on Paper

== M ==
- M or m – prefix designating a number in thousands (not to be confused with SI prefix M for mega- or m for milli)
- m – metre
- MAASP – maximum acceptable [or allowable] annular surface pressure
- MAC – multipole acoustic log or multiarm caliper log
- MACL – multiarm caliper log
- MAE – major accident event
- MAGST – magnetostratigraphic report
- MAL – Master Acronym List
- MAOP – maximum allowable operating pressure
- MAP – metrol acoustic processor
- MARA – maralog
- MAST – sonic tool (for recording waveform)
- MAWP – maximum allowable working pressure
- MBC – marine breakaway coupling
- MBC – membrane brine concentrator
- Mbd – thousand barrels per day
- MBES – multibeam echosounder
- Mbod – thousand barrels of oil per day
- Mboe – thousand barrels of oil equivalent
- Mboed – thousand barrels of oil equivalent per day
- MBP – mixed-bed polisher
- Mbpd – thousand barrels of oil per day
- MBR – minimum bend radius
- MBRO – multi-bore restriction orifices
- MBT – methylene blue test
- MBWH – multi-bowl wellhead
- MCC – motor control centre
- MCD – mechanical completion dossier
- Mcf – thousand cubic feet of natural gas
- Mcfe – thousand cubic feet of natural gas equivalent
- MCHE – main cryogenic heat exchanger
- MCM – manifold choke module
- MCP – monocolumn platform
- MCS – manifold and connection system
- MCS – master control station
- MCSS – multi-cycle sliding sleeve
- mD – millidarcy, measure of permeability, with units of area
- MD – measured depth
- MDO – marine diesel oil
- MDR – master document register
- MDRT – measured depth referenced to rotary table zero datum
- MD – measurements/drilling log
- MDEA – methyl diethanolamine (aMDEA)
- MDL – methane drainage license (United Kingdom), a type of onshore license allowing natural gas to be collected "in the course of operations for making and keeping safe mines whether or not disused"
- MDSS – measured depth referenced to mean sea level zero datum – "subsea" level
- MDDF - Measured Depth Derick Floor
- MDTHF - Measured Depth Tubing Head Flange
- MDRKB - Measured Depth Rotary Kelly Bushing
- MDT – modular formation dynamic tester, a tool used to get formation pressure in the hole (not borehole pressure which the PWD does). MDT could be run on Wireline or on the Drill Pipe
- MDR – mud damage removal (acid bullheading)
- MEA – monoethanolamine
- MEG – monoethylene glycol
- MEIC – Mechanical Electrical Instrumentation Commission
- MeOH – methanol (CH_{3}OH)
- MEPRL – mechanical properties log
- MER – Maximum Efficiency Rating
- MERCR – mercury injection study report
- MERG – merge FDC/CNL/gamma ray/dual laterolog/micro SFL log
- MEST – micro-electrical scanning tool
- MF – marsh funnel (mud viscosity)
- MFCT – multifinger caliper tool
- MGL – magnelog
- MGS – Mud Gas Separator
- MGU – Motor Gauge Unit
- MGPS – marine growth prevention system
- MHWN – mean high water neaps
- MHWS – mean high water springs
- MLE – Motor Lead Extension
- MLH – mud liner hanger
- MIFR – mini frac log
- MINL – minilog
- MIPAL – micropalaeo log
- MIRU – move in and rig up
- MIST – minimum industry safety training
- MIST - Motor Idle Slant Test
- MIT – mechanical integrity test
- MIT - Multi-finger Imaging Tool
- MIYP – maximum internal yield pressure
- mKB – meters below kelly bushing
- ML – mud line (depth reference)
- ML – microlog, or mud log
- MLL – microlaterolog
- MLF – marine loading facility
- MLWN – mean low water neaps
- MLWS – mean low water springs
- mm – millimetre (SI unit)
- MM – prefix designating a number in millions (thousand-thousand)
- MMbod – million barrels of oil per day
- MMboe – million barrels of oil equivalent
- MMboed – million barrels of oil equivalent per day
- MMbpd – million barrels per day
- MMcf – million cubic feet (of natural gas)
- MMcfe – million cubic feet (of natural gas equivalent)
- MMcfge – million cubic feet (of natural gas equivalent)
- MMS – Minerals Management Service (United States)
- MMscfd – million standard cubic feet per day
- MMTPA – millions of metric tonnes per annum
- MMstb – million stock barrels
- MNP – merge and playback log
- MODU – mobile offshore drilling unit (either of jack-up drill rig or semi-submersible rig or drill ship)
- MOF – marine offloading facility
- MOPO – matrix of permitted operations
- MOPU – mobile offshore production unit (to describe jack-up production rig, or semi-submersible production rig, or floating production, or storage ship)
- MOT – materials/marine offloading terminal
- MOV – motor operated valve
- MPA – micropalaeo analysis report
- MPD – managed pressure drilling
- MPFM – multi-phase flow meter
- MPK – merged playback log
- MPP – multiphase pump
- MPQT – manufacturing procedure qualification test
- MPS – manufacturing procedure specification
- MPSP – maximum predicted surface pressure
- MPSV – multi-purpose support vessel
- MPV – multi-purpose vessel
- MQC – multi-quick connection plate
- MR – marine riser
- MR – mixed refrigerant
- MR – morning report
- MRBP – magna range bridge plug
- MRC – maximum reservoir contact
- MRCV – multi-reverse circulating valve
- MRIT – magnetic resonance imaging tool
- MRIRE – magnetic resonance image report
- MRP – material requirement planning
- MRR – material receipt report
- MRT – marine riser tensioners
- MRT – mechanical run test
- MRX – magnetic resonance expert (wireline NMR tool)
- MSCT – mechanical sidewall coring tool
- MSDS – material safety data sheet
- MSFL – micro SFL log; micro-spherically focussed log (resistivity)
- MSI – mechanical and structural inspection
- MSIP – modular sonic imaging platform (sonic scanner)
- MSIPC – multi-stage inflatable packer collar
- MSL – mean sea level
- MSL – micro spherical log
- MSS – magnetic single shot
- MST – MST EXP resistivity log
- MSV – multipurpose support vessel
- MTBF – mean time between failures
- MT – motor temperature; DMT parameter for ESP motor
- MTO – material take-off
- MTT – MTT multi-isotope trace tool
- M/U – make up
- MUD – mud log
- MUDT – mud temperature log
- MuSol – mutual solvent
- MVB – master valve block on christmas tree
- MVC – minimum volume commitment
- MW – mud weight
- MWD – measurement while drilling
- MWDRE – measurement while drilling report
- MWP – maximum working pressure
- MWS – marine warranty survey

== N ==
- NACE – National Association of Corrosion Engineers
- NAPE – Nigerian Association of Petroleum Explorationists
- NAM – North American
- NAPF – non-aqueous phase fluid
- NAPL – non-aqueous phase liquid
- NASA – non-active side arm (term used in North Sea oil for kill wing valve on a christmas tree)
- NAVIG – navigational log
- NB – nominal bore
- NCC – normally clean condensate
- ND – nipple down
- NDE – non-destructive examination
- NEFE – non-emulsifying iron inhibitor (usually used with hydrochloric acid)
- NEUT – neutron log
- NFG – 'no fucking good' used for marking damaged equipment,
- NFI – no further investment
- NFW – new field wildcat, Lahee classification
- NG – natural gas
- NGDC – national geoscience data centre (United Kingdom)
- NGL – natural gas liquids
- NGR – natural gamma ray
- NGRC – national geological records centre (United Kingdom)
- NGS – NGS log
- NGSS – NGS spectro log
- NGT – natural gamma ray tool
- NGTLD – NGT LDT QL log
- NGLQT – NGT QL log
- NGTR – NGT ratio log
- NHDA – National Hydrocarbons Data Archive (United Kingdom)
- NHPV – net hydrocarbon pore volume
- NL-NG – No loss-no gain
- NMDC – non-magnetic drill collar
- NMHC – non-methane hydrocarbons
- NMR – nuclear magnetic resonance kog
- NMVOC – non-methane volatile organic compounds
- NNF – normally no flow
- NNS – northern North Sea
- NOISL – noise log
- NOC – National Oil Company
- NORM – naturally occurring radioactive material
- NP – non-producing well
- NPD – Norwegian Petroleum Directorate
- NPS – nominal pipe size (sometimes NS)
- NPSH(R) – net-positive suction head (required)
- NPT – Non-Productive Time (used during drilling or well intervention operations mainly, malfunction of equipment or the lack of personnel competencies that result in loss of time, which is costly)
- NPV – net present value
- NRB – not required back
- NRPs – non-rotating protectors
- NRI – net revenue interest
- NMR – nuclear magnetic resonance
- NRV – non-return valve
- NPW – new pool wildcat, Lahee classification
- NS – North Sea; can also refer to the North Slope Borough, Alaska, the North Slope, which includes Prudhoe Bay Oil Field (the largest US oil field), Kuparuk Oil Field, Milne Point, Lisburne, and Point McIntyre among others
- NTHF – non-toxic high flash
- NTP – Normal temperature and pressure
- NTU – nephelometric turbidity unit
- NUBOP – nipple (ed),(ing) up blow-out preventer
- NUI – normally unattended installation
- NUMAR – nuclear and magnetic resonance – image log

== O ==
- O&G – oil and gas
- O&M – operations and maintenance
- O/S – overshot, fishing tool
- OBCS – ocean bottom cable system
- OBDTL – OBDT log
- OBEVA – OBDT evaluation report
- OBI – optical borehole imaging
- OBM – oil-based mud
- OBO – operated by others
- OCD – oil conservation division
- OCIMF – Oil Companies International Marine Forum
- OCI – oil corrosion inhibitor (vessels)
- OCL – quality control log
- OCM – offshore construction manager
- OCS – offshore construction supervisor
- OCTG – oil country tubular goods (oil well casing, tubing, and drill pipe)
- OD – outer diameter (of a tubular component such as casing)
- ODT – oil down to
- OFE – oil field equipment
- OFST – offset vertical seismic profile
- OEM – original equipment manufacturer
- OFIC – offshore interim completion certificate
- OGA – Oil and Gas Authority (UK oil and gas regulatory authority)
- OH – open hole
- OH – open hole log
- OHC – open hole completion
- OHD – open hazardous drain
- OHUT – offshore hook-up team
- OI – oxygen index
- OIM – offshore installation manager
- OLAF – offshore footless loading arm
- OMC – Offshore Material Coordinator
- OMRL – oriented micro-resistivity log
- ONAN – oil natural air natural cooled transformer
- ONNR – Office of Natural Resources Revenue (formerly MMS)
- OOE – offshore operation engineer (senior technical authority on an offshore oil platform)
- OOIP – original oil in place
- OOT/S – out of tolerance/straightness
- O/P – Over Pull
- OP - Oil Producer
- OPITO – offshore petroleum industry training organization
- OPEC – Organization of Petroleum Exporting Countries
- OPL – operations log
- OPRES – overpressure log
- OPS – operations report
- ORICO – oriented core data report
- ORM – operability reliability maintainability
- ORRI – overriding royalty interest
- ORF – onshore receiving facility
- OS&D – over, short, and damage report
- OS – online survey
- OSA _ Offshore Safety Advisor
- OSV – offshore supply vessel
- OT – a well on test
- OT – off tree
- OTDR – optical time domain reflectometry
- OTIP – operational testing implementation plan
- OTL – operations team leader
- OTP – operational test procedure
- OTR – order to remit
- OTSG – one-time through steam generator
- OWC – oil-water contact
- OUT – outpost, Lahee classification
- OUT – oil up to
- OVCH – oversize charts
- OVID – offshore vessel inspection database

== P ==
- P – producing well
- P&A – plug(ged) and abandon(ed) (well)
- PA – producing asset
- PA – polyamide
- PA – producing asset with exploration potential
- PACO – process, automation, control and optimisation
- PACU – packaged air conditioning unit
- PADPRT – pressure assisted drillpipe running tool
- PAGA – public address general alarm
- PAL – palaeo chart
- PALYN – palynological analysis report
- PAR – pre-assembled rack
- PAU – pre-assembled unit
- PBDMS – playback DMSLS log
- PBHL – proposed bottom hole location
- PBR – polished bore receptacle (component of a completion string)
- PBD – pason billing system
- PBTD – plug back total depth
- PBU – pressure build-up (applies to integrity testing on valves)
- PCA – production concession agreement
- PCB – polychlorinated biphenyl
- PCCC – pressure containing anti‐corrosion caps
- PCCL – perforation casing collar locator log
- PCDC – pressure-cased directional (geometry i.e. borehole survey) MWD tool
- PCE – pressure control equipment
- PCDM – power and control distribution module
- PCKR – packer
- PCMS – polymer coupon monitoring system
- PCN – process control network
- PCO – pre-commission preparations (pipeline)
- PCOLL – perforation and collar
- PCP – progressing cavity pump
- PCP – possible condensate production
- PCP - Production Casing Pressure
- PCPT – piezo-cone penetration test
- PCS – process control system
- PDC – perforation depth control
- PDC – polycrystalline diamond compact (a type of drilling bit)
- PDG/PDHG – permanent downhole gauge
- PDGB – permanent drilling guide base
- PDKL – PDK log
- PDKR – PDK 100 report
- PDM –positive displacement motor
- PDMS – permanent downhole monitoring system
- PDP – proved developed producing (reserves)
- PDP – positive displacement pump
- PDPM – power distribution protection module
- PDNP – proved developed not producing
- PDR – physical data room
- PDT – differential pressure transmitter
- PE – petroleum engineer
- PE – professional engineer
- PE – production engineer
- PE – polyethylene
- PE – product emulsion
- PE – production enhancement
- PEA – palaeo environment study report
- PED – pressure equipment directive
- PEDL – petroleum exploration and development licence (United Kingdom)
- PEFS – process engineering flow scheme
- PENL – penetration log
- PEP – PEP log
- PERC – powered emergency release coupling
- PERDC – perforation depth control
- PERFO – perforation log
- PERM – permeability
- PERML – permeability log
- PESGB – Petroleum Exploration Society of Great Britain
- PETA – petrographical analysis report
- PETD – petrographic data log
- PETLG – petrophysical evaluation log
- PETPM – petrography permeametry report
- PETRP – petrophysical evaluation report
- PEX – platform express toolstring (resistivity, porosity, imaging)
- PFC – perforation formation correlation
- PFD – process flow diagram
- PFD – probability of failure on demand
- PFE – plate/frame heat exchanger
- PFHE – plate fin/frame heat exchanger
- PFPG – perforation plug log
- PFREC – perforation record log
- PG – pressure gauge (report)
- PGC – Potential Gas Committee
- PGB – permanent guide base
- PGOR – produced gas oil ratio
- PGP – possible gas production
- PH – phasor log
- PHASE – phasor processing log
- PHB – pre-hydrated bentonite
- PHC – passive heave compensator
- PHOL – photon log
- PHPU – platform hydraulic power unit
- PHPA – partially hydrolyzed polyacrylamide
- PHYFM – physical formation log
- PI – productivity index
- PI – permit issued
- PI – pressure indicator
- P&ID – piping and instrumentation diagram
- PINTL – production interpretation
- PIP – pump intake pressure
- PIP – pipe in pipe
- PIT – pump intake temperature
- PJSM – pre-job safety meeting
- PL – production license
- PLEM – pipeline end manifold
- PLES – pipeline end structure
- PLET – pipeline end termination
- PLG – plug log
- PLR – pig launcher/receiver
- PLS – position location system
- PLSV – pipelay support vessel
- PLT – production logging tool
- PLTQ – production logging tool quick-look log
- PLTRE – production logging tool report
- PLQ – permanent living quarters
- PMI – positive material identification
- PMM – permanent magnet motor
- PMOC – project management of change
- PMR – precooled mixed refrigerant
- PMV – production master valve
- PNP – proved not producing
- POB – personnel on board
- POBM – pseudo-oil-based mud
- POD – plan of development
- POF – permanent operations facility
- POH – pull out of hole
- POOH – pull out of hole
- PON – petroleum operations notice (United Kingdom)
- POP – pump-out plug
- POP – possible oil production
- POP – place on production
- POR – density porosity log
- PORRT – pack off run retrieval tool
- POSFR – post-fracture report
- POSTW – post-well appraisal report
- POSWE – post-well summary report
- PP – DXC pressure plot log
- PP – pump pressure
- PPA – Pounds of Proppant added
- PP&A – permanent plug and abandon (also P&A)
- ppb – pounds per barrel
- PPC – powered positioning caliper (Schlumberger dual-axis wireline caliper tool)
- ppcf – pounds per cubic foot
- PPD – pour point depressant
- PPE – preferred pressure end
- PPE – personal protective equipment
- ppf - Pounds Per Foot
- PPFG – pore pressure/fracture gradient
- ppg – pounds per gallon
- PPI – post production inspection/intervention
- PPI – post pipelay installation
- PPL – pre-perforated liner
- pptf – pounds (per square inch) per thousand feet (of depth) – a unit of fluid density/pressure
- PPS – production packer setting
- PPU – pipeline process and umbilical
- PQR – procedure qualification record
- PR2 – testing regime to API6A annex F
- PRA – production reporting and allocation
- PREC – perforation record
- PRESS – pressure report
- PRL – polished rod liner
- PRV – pressure relief valve
- PROD – production log
- PROTE – production test report
- PROX – proximity log
- PRSRE – pressure gauge report
- PSANA – pressure analysis
- PSA – production service agreement
- PSA – production sharing agreement
- PSC – production sharing contract
- PSD – planned shutdown
- PSD – pressure safety device
- PSD – process shutdown
- PSD – pump setting depth
- PSE – pressure safety element (rupture disc)
- PSIA – pounds per square inch atmospheric
- PSIG – pounds per square inch gauge
- PSL – product specification level
- PSLOG – pressure log
- PSM – process safety management
- PSP – pseudostatic spontaneous potential
- PSP – positive sealing plug
- PSPL – PSP leak detection log
- PSSR – pre-startup safety review
- PSSR – pressure systems safety regulations (UK)
- PSQ – plug squeeze log
- PST – PST log
- PSV – pipe/platform supply vessel
- PSV – pressure safety valve
- PSVAL – pressure evaluation log
- PTA/S – pipeline termination assembly/structure
- PTO – permit to sperate
- PTRO – test rack opening pressure (For a gas lift valve)
- PTSET – production test setter
- PTTC – Petroleum Technology Transfer Council, United States
- PTW – permit to work
- PU – pick-up (tubing, rods, power swivel, etc.)
- PUD – proved undeveloped reserves
- PUN – puncher log
- PUR – plant upset report
- PUQ – production utilities quarters (platform)
- PUWER – Provision and Use of Work Equipment Regulations 1998
- PV – plastic viscosity
- PVDF – polyvinylidene fluoride
- PVSV –pressure vacuum safety valve
- PVT – pressure volume temperature
- PVTRE – pressure volume temperature report
- PW – produced water
- PWD – pressure while drilling
- PWB – production wing block (XT)
- PWHT – post-weld heat treat
- PWRI – produced water reinjection
- PWV – production wing valve (also known as a flow wing valve on a christmas tree)

== Q ==
- QA – quality assurance
- QC – quality control
- QCR – quality control report
- QL – quick-look log
- QJ - Quad Joint

== R ==
- R/B – rack back
- R&M – repair and maintenance
- RAC – ratio curves
- RACI – responsible / accountable / consulted / informed
- RAT – riser assembly tower
- RAM – reliability, availability, and maintainability
- RAWS – raw stacks VSP log
- RBI – risk-based inspection
- RBP – retrievable bridge plug
- RBS – riser base spool
- RCA – root cause analysis
- RCRA - Resource Conservation and Recovery Act
- RCKST – rig checkshot
- RCD – rotating control device
- RCI – reservoir characterization instrument (for downhole fluid measurements e.g. spectrometry, density)
- RCL – retainer correlation log
- RCM – reliability-centred maintenance
- RCR – remote component replacement (tool)
- RCU – remote control unit
- RDMO – rig down move out
- RDS – ROV-deployed sonar
- RDRT – rig down rotary tools
- RDT – reservoir description tool
- RDVI – remote digital video inspection
- RDWL – rig down wireline
- RE – reservoir engineer
- REOR – reorientation log
- RE-PE – re-perforation report
- RESAN – reservoir analysis
- RESDV – riser emergency shutdown valve
- RESEV – reservoir evaluation
- RESFL – reservoir fluid
- RESI – resistivity log
- RESL – reservoir log
- RESOI – residual oil
- REZ – renewable energy zone (United Kingdom)
- RF – recovery factor
- RFCC – ready for commissioning certificate
- RFLNG – ready for liquefied natural gas
- RFM – riser feeding machine
- RFMTS – repeat formation tester
- RFO – ready for operations (pipelines/cables)
- RFR – refer to attached (e.g., letter, document)
- RFSU – ready for start-up
- RFT – repeat formation tester
- RFTRE – repeat formation tester report
- RFTS – repeat formation tester sample
- RHA – riser heel anchor
- RHD – rectangular heavy duty – usually screens used for shaking
- RHT – Right Hand Turn
- RIGMO – rig move
- RIH – run in hole
- RIMS – riser integrity monitoring system
- RITT – riser insertion tube (tool)
- RKB – rotary kelly bushing (a datum for measuring depth in an oil well)
- RLOF – rock load-out facility
- RMLC – request for mineral land clearance
- RMP – reservoir management plan
- RMS – ratcheting mule shoe
- RMS – riser monitoring system
- RNT – RNT log
- ROB – received on board (used for fuel/water received in bunkering operations)
- ROCT – rotary coring tool
- ROP – rate of penetration
- ROP – rate of perforation
- ROT – remote-operated tool
- ROV/WROV – remotely operated vehicle/work class remotely operated vehicle, used for subsea construction and maintenance
- ROZ – recoverable oil zone
- ROWS – remote operator workstation
- RPCM – ring pair corrosion monitoring
- RPM – revolutions per minute (rotations per minute)
- RRC – Railroad Commission of Texas (governs oil and gas production in Texas)
- RROCK – routine rock properties report
- RRR – reserve replacement ratio
- RSES – responsible for safety and environment on site
- RSPP – a publicly traded oil and gas producer focused on horizontal drilling of multiple stacked pay zones in the oil-rich Permian basin
- RSS – rig site survey
- RSS – rotary steerable systems
- RST – reservoir saturation tool (Schlumberger) log
- RTMS – riser tension monitoring system
- RTE – rotary table elevation
- RTO – real-time operation
- RTP/RTS – return to production/service
- RTTS – retrievable test-treat-squeeze (packer)
- RU – rig up
- RURT – rig up rotary tools
- RV – relief valve
- RVI – remote video inspection
- RWD – reaming while drilling

== S ==
- SABA – supplied air-breathing apparatus
- SAFE – safety analysis function evaluation
- SAGD – steam-assisted gravity drainage
- SALM – single anchor loading mooring
- SAM – subsea accumulator module
- SAML – sample log
- SAMTK – sample-taker log
- SANDA – sandstone analysis log
- SAPP – sodium acid pyrophosphate
- SAS – safety and automation system
- SAT – SAT log
- SAT – site acceptance test
- SB – SIT-BO log
- SBF – synthetic base fluid
- SBM – synthetic base mud
- SBT – segmented bond tool
- SC – seismic calibration
- SCADA – supervisory control and data acquisition
- SCAL – special core analysis
- SCAP – scallops log
- SCBA – self-contained breathing apparatus
- SCUBA – self-contained underwater breathing apparatus
- SCC – system completion certificate
- SCD – system control diagram
- SCDES – sidewall core description
- scf – standard cubic feet (of gas)
- scf/STB – standard cubic feet (of gas) / stock tank barrel (of fluid)
- SCHLL – Schlumberger log
- SCM(MB) – subsea control module (mounting base)
- SCO – synthetic crude oil
- SCO – sand clean-out
- SCR – slow circulation rate
- SCR – steel catenary riser
- SCRS – slow circulation rates
- SCSG – type of pump
- SCSSV – surface-controlled subsurface safety valve
- SDON – shut down overnight
- SEP – surface emissive power
- SPCU – subsea control unit
- SCVF – surface casing vent flow. It's kind of test
- SD – sonic density
- SDFD – shut down for day
- SDFN – shut down for night
- SDIC – sonic dual induction
- SDL – supplier document list
- SDM/U – subsea distribution module/unit
- SDPBH – SDP bottom hole pressure report
- SDSS – super duplex stainless steel
- SDT – step draw-down test (sometimes SDDT)
- SDU/M – subsea distribution unit/module
- SEA – strategic environmental assessment (United Kingdom)
- SECGU – section gauge log
- SEDHI – sedimentary history
- SEDIM – sedimentology
- SEDL – sedimentology log
- SEDRE – sedimentology report
- SEG – Society of Exploration Geophysicsists
- SEM – subsea electronics module
- Semi (or semi-sub) – semi-submersible drilling rig
- SEP – surface emissive power
- SEPAR – separator sampling report
- SEQSU – sequential survey
- SF – Self Flowing
- SFERAE – global association for the use of knowledge on fractured rock in a state of stress, in the field of energy, culture and environment
- SFL – steel flying lead
- SG – static gradient, specific gravity
- SGR – shale gouge ratio
- SGS – steel gravity structure
- SGSI – Shell Global Solutions International
- SGUN – squeeze gun
- SHA – sensor harness assembly
- SHC – system handover certificate
- SHDT – stratigraphic high resolution dipmeter tool
- SHINC – Sunday holiday including
- SHO – stab and hinge over
- SHOCK – shock log
- SHOWL – show log
- SHT – shallow hole test
- SI – shut in well
- SI – structural integrity
- SI – scale inhibitor
- SIBHP – Shut in Bottom-Hole Pressure
- SIBHT – Shut in Bottom-Hole Temperature
- SID – Specific Instruction Document/ Standard Instruction for Drillers
- SIT – System Integrity Test
- SI/TA – shut in/temporarily abandoned
- SIA – social impact assessment
- SIC – subsea installation contractor
- SICP – shut-in casing pressure
- SIDPP – shut-in drill pipe pressure
- SIDSM – sidewall sample
- SIF – safety instrumented functions (test)
- SIGTTO – Society of International Gas Tanker and Terminal Operators
- SIL – safety integrity level
- SIMCON – simultaneous construction
- SIMOPS – simultaneous operations
- SIP – shut-in pressure
- SIP - Simultaneous injection and production
- SIPCOM – simultaneous production and commissioning
- SIPES – Society of Independent Professional Earth Scientists, United States
- SIPROD – simultaneous production and drilling
- SIS – safety-instrumented system
- SIT – system integration test FR SIT – field representation SIT
- SIT – (casing) shoe integrity test
- SITHP – shut-in tubing hanger/head pressure
- SITT – single TT log
- SIWHP – shut-in well head pressure
- SKPLT – stick plot log
- SL – seismic lines
- SLS – SLS GR log
- SLT – SLT GR log
- SM or S/M – safety meeting
- SMA – small amount
- SMLS – seamless PipeMPP
- SMO – suction module
- SMPC – subsea multiphase pump, which can increase flowrate and pressure of the untreated wellstream
- SN – seat nipple
- SNAM – Societá Nazionale Metanodotti now Snam S.p.A. (Italy)
- SNP – sidewall neutron porosity
- SNS – southern North Sea
- S/O – Slack Off
- SOBM – synthetic oil-based mud
- SOLAS – safety of life at sea
- SONCB – sonic calibration log
- SONRE – sonic calibration report
- SONWR – sonic waveform report
- SONWV – sonic waveform log
- SOP – Safe Operating Procedure
- SOP – shear-out plug
- SOP - Standard Operating Procedure
- SOR – senior operations representative
- SOW - Scope of Work
- SOW – slip-on wellhead
- SP – set point
- SP – shot point (geophysics)
- SP – spontaneous potential (well log)
- SPAMM – subsea pressurization and monitoring manifold
- SPCAN – special core analysis
- SPCU – subsea power and control unit
- SPE – Society of Petroleum Engineers
- SPEAN – spectral analysis
- SPEL – spectralog
- spf – shots per foot (perforation density)
- SPFM – single-phase flow meter
- SPH – SPH log
- SPHL – self-propelled hyperbaric lifeboats
- SPM – side pocket mandrel
- SPM – strokes per minute (of a positive-displacement pump)
- spm – shots per meter (perforation density)
- SPMT – self-propelled modular transporter
- SPOP – spontaneous potential log
- SPP – stand pipe pressure
- SPR – slow pumping rate
- SPROF – seismic profile
- SPS – subsea production systems
- SPT – shallower pool test, Lahee classification
- SPUD – spud date (started drilling well)
- SPWLA – Society of Petrophysicists and Well Log Analysts
- SQL – seismic quicklook log
- SQZ – squeeze job
- SR – shear rate
- SRD – seismic reference datum, an imaginary horizontal surface at which TWT is assumed to be zero
- SREC – seismic record log
- SRJ – semi-rigid jumper
- SRK – Soave-Redlich-Kwong
- SRO – surface read-out
- SRP – sucker rod pump
- SRB – sulfate-reducing bacteria
- SRT – site receival test
- SS – subsea, as in a datum of depth, e.g. TVDSS (true vertical depth subsea)
- SS - Short String
- SSCC – sulphide stress corrosion cracking
- SSCP – subsea cryogenic pipeline
- SSCS – subsea control system
- SSD – sub-sea level depth (in metres or feet, positive value in downwards direction with respect to the geoid)
- SSD – sliding sleeve door
- SSFP – subsea flowline and pipeline
- SSG – sidewall sample gun
- SSH – steam superheater
- SSIC – safety system inhibit certificate
- SSIV – subsea isolation valve
- SSTV – subsea test valve
- SSM – subsea manifolds
- SSMAR – synthetic seismic marine log
- SSPLR – subsea pig launcher/receiver
- SSSL – Supplementary Seismic Survey Licence (United Kingdom), a type of onshore licence
- SSSV – sub-surface safety valve
- SSTT – subsea test tree
- SSU – subsea umbilicals
- SSV – surface safety valve
- SSWI – subsea well intervention
- STAB – stabiliser
- STAGR – static gradient survey report
- STB – stock tank barrel
- STC – STC log
- STD – 2-3 joints of tubing
- STFL – steel tube fly lead
- STG – steam turbine generator
- STGL – stratigraphic log
- STHE – shell-and-tube heat exchanger
- STIMU – stimulation report
- STKPT – stuck point
- STL – STL gamma ray log
- STL – submerged turret loading
- STRAT – stratigraphy, stratigraphic
- STRRE – stratigraphy report
- STOIIP – stock tank oil initially in place
- STOOIP – stock tank oil originally in place
- STOP – safety training observation program
- STP – submerged turret production
- STP – standard temperature and pressure
- STSH – string shot
- STTR – single top tension riser
- ST&C – short thread and coupled
- STC – short thread and coupled
- STU – steel tube umbilical
- STV – select tester valve
- SUML – summarised log
- SUMRE – summary report
- SUMST – geological summary sheet
- SURF – subsea/umbilicals/risers/flowlines
- SURFR – surface sampling report
- SURRE – survey report
- SURU – start-up ramp-up
- SURVL – survey chart log
- SUT(A/B) – subsea umbilical termination (assembly/box)
- SUTA – subsea umbilical termination assembly
- SUTU – subsea umbilical termination unit
- SW – salt water
- SWC – side wall core
- SWD – salt water disposal well
- SWE – senior well engineer
- SWHE – spiral-wound heat exchanger
- SWOT – strengths, weaknesses, opportunities, and threats
- SWT – surface well testing
- SV – sleeve valve, or standing valve
- SVLN – safety valve landing nipple
- SWLP – seawater lift pump
- SYNRE – synthetic seismic report
- SYSEI – synthetic seismogram log

== T ==
- T – well flowing to tank
- T/T – tangent to tangent
- TA – temporarily abandoned well
- TA – top assembly
- TAC – tubing anchor (or tubing–annulus communication)
- TAGOGR – thermally assisted gas/oil gravity drainage
- TAN – total acid number
- TAPLI – tape listing
- TAPVE – tape verification
- TAR – true amplitude recovery
- TB – tubing puncher log
- TBE – technical bid evaluation
- TBG – tubing
- TBT – through bore tree / toolbox talk
- TC – type curve
- TCA – total corrosion allowance
- TCC – tungsten carbide coating
- TCCC – transfer of care, custody and control
- TCF – temporary construction facilities
- TCF – trillion cubic feet (of gas)
- TCI – tungsten carbide insert (a type of rollercone drillbit)
- TCP – tubing conveyed perforating (gun)
- TCPD – tubing-conveyed perforating depth
- TCU – thermal combustion unit
- TD – target depth
- TD – total depth (depth of the end of the well; also a verb, to reach the final depth, used as an acronym in this case)
- TDD – total depth (driller)
- TDC - Top Dead Center
- TDC – total drilling cost
- TDL – total depth (logger)
- TDM – touch-down monitoring
- TDP – touch-down point
- TDS – top drive system
- TDS – total dissolved solids
- TDT – thermal decay time log
- TDTCP – TDT CPI log
- TDT GR – TDT gamma ray casing collar locator log
- TEA – triethanolamine
- TEFC – totally enclosed fan-cooled
- TEG – triethylene glycol
- TEG – thermal electric generator
- TELER – teledrift report
- TEMP – temperature log
- TETT – too early to tell
- TFE – total fina elf (obsolete; Now Total S.A.) major French multinational oil company
- TFL – through flow line
- TFM – tubular feeding machine
- TGB – temporary guide base
- TGT / TG – tank gross test
- TGOR – total gas oil ratio (GOR uncorrected for gas lift gas present in the production fluid)
- TH – tubing hanger
- THCP – tubing hanger crown plug
- Thr/Th# – thruster ('#'- means identification letter/number of the equipment, e.g. thr3 or thr#3 means "thruster no. 3")
- THD – tubing head
- THERM – thermometer log
- THF – tubing hanger flange
- THF – tetrahydrofuran (organic solvent)
- THP – tubing hanger pressure (pressure in the production tubing as measured at the tubing hanger)
- THRT – tubing hanger running tool
- THS – tubing head spool
- TIE – tie-in log
- TIH – trip into hole
- TIS – tie-in spool
- TIT – tubing integrity test
- TIW – Texas Iron Works (pressure valve)
- TIEBK – tieback report
- TLI – top of logging interval
- TLOG – technical log
- TLP – tension-leg platform
- TMCM – transverse mercator central meridian
- TMD – total measured depth in a wellbore
- TNDT – thermal neutron decay time
- TNDTG – thermal neutron decay time/gamma ray log
- TOC – top of cement
- TOC – Total organic carbon
- TOF – top of fish
- TOFD – time of first data sample (on seismic trace)
- TOFS – time of first surface sample (on seismic trace)
- TOH – trip out of hole
- TOOH – trip out of hole
- TOL – top of liner
- TOL _ Top of Lead Cement
- TOP - Top of Pipe
- TORAN – torque and drag analysis
- TOT – Top of Tail Cement
- TOVALOP – tanker owners' voluntary agreement concerning liability for oil pollution
- TPC – temporary plant configuration
- TPERF – tool performance
- TQM – total quality management
- TR – temporary refuge
- TRCFR – total recordable case frequency rate
- TRT – tree running tool
- TR – temporary refuge
- TRA – top riser assembly
- TRA – tracer log
- TRACL – tractor log
- TRAN –transition zone
- TRD – total report data
- TREAT – treatment report
- TREP – test report
- TRIP – trip condition log
- TRS – tubing running services
- TRSV – tubing-retrievable safety valve
- TRSCSSV – tubing-Retrievable surface-controlled sub-surface valve
- TRSCSSSV – tubing-retrievable surface-controlled sub-surface safety valve
- TSA – thermally sprayed aluminium
- TSA – terminal storage agreement
- TSI – temporarily shut in
- TSJ – tapered stress joint
- TSOV – tight shut-off valve
- TSS – total suspended solids
- TSTR – tensile strength
- TT – torque tool
- TT – transit time log
- TTOC – theoretical top of cement
- TTVBP – through-tubing vented bridge plug
- TTRD – through-tubing rotary drilling
- TUC – topside umbilical connection
- TUC – turret utility container
- TUM – tracked umbilical machine
- TUPA – topside umbilical panel assembly
- TUTA – topside umbilical termination box/unit/assembly (TUTU)
- TVBDF – true vertical depth below derrick floor
- TV/BIP – ratio of total volume (ore and overburden) to bitumen in place
- TVD – true vertical depth
- TVDPB – true vertical depth playback log
- TVDRT – true vertical depth (referenced to) rotary table zero datum
- TVDKB – true vertical depth (referenced to) top kelly bushing zero datum
- TVDSS – true vertical depth (referenced to) mean sea level zero datum
- TVELD – time and velocity to depth
- TVRF – true vertical depth versus repeat formation tester
- TWT – two-way time (seismic)
- TWTTL – two-way travel time log

== U ==
- UBHO – universal bottom hole orientation (sub)
- UBI – ultrasonic borehole imager
- UBIRE – ultrasonic borehole imager report
- UCH – umbilical connection housing
- UCIT – ultrasonic casing imaging tool (high resolution casing and corrosion imaging tool)
- UCL – unit control logic
- UCR – unsafe condition report
- UCS – unconfined compressive strength
- UCSU – upstream commissioning and start-up
- UFJ – upper flex joint
- UFR – umbilical flow lines and risers
- UGF – universal guide frame
- UIC – underground injection control
- UKCS – United Kingdom continental shelf
- UKOOA – United Kingdom Offshore Operators Association
- UKOOG – United Kingdom Onshore Operators Group
- ULCGR – uncompressed LDC CNL gamma ray log
- UMCA – umbilical midline connection assembly
- UMV – upper master valve (from a christmas tree)
- UPB – unmanned production buoy
- UPL – upper pressure limit
- UPR – upper pipe ram
- UPT – upper pressure threshold
- URA – upper riser assembly
- URT – universal running tool
- USBL – ultra-short baseline systems
- USIT – ultrasonic imaging tool (cement bond logging, casing wear logging)
- USGS – United States Geological Survey
- UTA/B – umbilical termination assembly/box
- UTAJ – umbilical termination assembly jumper
- UTHCP – upper tubing hanger crown plug
- UTM – universal transverse mercator
- UWI – unique well identifier
- UWILD – underwater inspection in lieu of dry-docking
- UZV – shutdown valve

== V ==
- VBR – variable bore ram
- VCCS – vertical clamp connection system
- VDENL – variation density log
- VDL – variable density log
- VDU – vacuum distillation unit, used in processing bitumen
- VELL – velocity log
- VERAN – verticality analysis
- VERIF – verification list
- VERLI – verification listing
- VERTK – vertical thickness
- VFC – volt-free contact
- VGMS – vent gas monitoring system (flexible riser annulus vent system)
- VIR – value-investment ratio
- VISME – viscosity measurement
- VIV – vortex-induced vibration
- VLP – vertical lift performance
- VLS – vertical lay system
- VLTCS – very-low-temperature carbon steel
- VO – variation order
- VOCs – volatile organic compounds
- VOR – variation order request
- VPR – vertical pipe racker
- VRS – vapor recovery system
- VRR – voidage replacement ratio
- VS – vertical section
- VSD – variable-speed drive
- VSI – versatile seismic imager (Schlumberger VSP tool)
- VSP – vertical seismic profile
- VSPRO – vertical seismic profile
- VTDLL – vertical thickness dual laterolog
- VTFDC – vertical thickness FDC CNL log
- VTISF – vertical thickness ISF log
- VWL – velocity well log
- VXT – vertical christmas tree

== W ==
- W – watt
- WABAN – well abandonment report
- WAC – weak acid cation
- WAG – water alternating gas (describes an injection well which alternates between water and gas injection)
- WALKS – walkaway seismic profile
- WAS – well access system
- WATAN – water analysis
- WAV3 – amplitude (in seismics)
- WAV4 – two-way travel time (in seismics)
- WAV5 – compensate amplitudes
- WAVF – waveform log
- WBCO – wellbore clean-out
- WBE – well barrier element
- WBM – water-based drilling mud
- WBS – well bore schematic
- WBS – work breakdown structure
- WC – watercut
- WC – wildcat (well)
- W/C – water cushion
- WCC – work control certificate
- WCT – wet christmas tree
- WE – well engineer
- WEG – wireline entry guide
- WELDA – well data report
- WELP – well log plot
- WEQL – well equipment layout
- WESTR – well status record
- WESUR – well summary report
- WF – water flood(ing)
- WFAC – waveform acoustic log
- WGEO – well geophone report
- WGFM – wet gas flow meter
- WGR – water gas ratio
- WGUNT – water gun test
- Wh – white
- WH – well history
- WHIG – whitehouse gauge
- WHM – wellhead maintenance
- WHP – wellhead pressure
- WHRU – waste heat recovery unit
- WHSIP – wellhead shut-in pressure
- WI – water injection
- WI – working interest
- WI – work instructions
- WIH – working in hole
- WIKA – definition needed
- WIMS – well integrity management system
- WIR – water intake risers
- WIT – water investigation tool
- WITS – Wellsite Information Transfer Specification
- WITSML – wellsite information transfer standard markup language
- WIPSP – WIP stock packer
- WLC – wireline composite log
- WLL – wireline logging
- WLSUM – well summary
- WLTS –well log tracking system
- WLTS – well log transaction system
- WM – wet mate
- WHM – wellhead maintenance
- WHMIS – workplace hazardous material information systems
- WHP – wellhead pressure
- WLM – Wireline Measurement
- WO – well in work over
- WO/O – waiting on orders
- WOA – well operations authorization
- WOB – weight on bit
- WOC – wait on cement
- WOC – water/oil contact (or oil/water contact)
- WOE – well operations engineer (a key person of well services)
- WOM – wait/waiting on material
- WOR – water-oil ratio
- WORKO – workover
- WOS – west of Shetland, oil province on the UKCS
- WOW – wait/waiting on weather
- WP – well proposal or working pressure
- WPC – water pollution control
- WPLAN – well course plan
- WPQ/S/T – weld procedure qualification/specification/test
- WPP – wellhead protection platform
- WPR – well prognosis report
- WQ – a textural parameter used for CBVWE computations (Halliburton)
- WQCA – Water Quality Control Act
- WQCB – Water Quality Control Board
- WR – wireline retrievable (as in a WR plug)
- WR – wet resistivity
- WRS – well report sepia
- WRSCSSV – wireline-retrievable surface-controlled sub-surface valve
- WSCL – well site core log
- WSE – well seismic edit
- WSERE – well seismic edit report
- WSG – wellsite geologist
- WSHT – well shoot
- WSL – well site log
- WSO – water shut-off
- WSOG – well-specific operation guidelines
- WSP – well seismic profile
- WSR – well shoot report
- WSS – well services supervisor (leader of well services at the wellsite)
- WSS – working spreadsheet (for logging)
- WSSAM – well site sample
- WSSOF – WSS offset profile
- WSSUR – well seismic survey plot
- WSSVP – WSS VSP raw shots
- WSSVS – WSS VSP stacks
- WST – well seismic tool (checkshot)
- WSTL – well site test log
- WSU – well service unit
- wt – wall thickness
- WT – well test
- WTI – West Texas Intermediate benchmark crude
- WTR – water
- WUT – water up to
- WV – wing valve (from a christmas tree)
- WVS – well velocity survey
- WWS – wire-wrapped (sand) screens

== X ==
- XC – cross-connection, cross correlation
- XL or EXL – exploration licence (United Kingdom), a type of onshore licence issued between the First Onshore Licensing Round (1986) and the sixth (1992)
- Xln – crystalline (minerals)
- XLPE -cross-linked polyethylene
- XMAC – cross-multipole array acoustic log
- XMAC-E – XMAC elite (next generation of XMAC)
- XMRI – extended-range micro-imager (Halliburton)
- XMT/XT/HXT – christmas tree
- XO – cross-over
- XOM – Exxon Mobil
- XOV – cross-over valve
- XPERM – matrix permeability in the x-direction
- XPHLOC – crossplot selection for XPHI
- XPOR – crossplot porosity
- XPT – formation pressure test log (Schlumberger)
- XV – on/off valve (process control)
- XYC – XY caliper log (Halliburton)

== Y ==
- yd – yarduhbk g
- yl – holdup factor
- YP – yield point
- yr – year

== Z ==
- Z – depth, in the geosciences referring to the depth dimension in any x, y, z data
- ZDENP – density log
- ZDL – compensated Z-densilog
- ZLD – zero liquid discharge
- ZOI – zone of influence

== See also ==
- Oilfield terminology
