= Production packer =

Device for sealing a borehole section

A production packer is a standard component of the completion hardware of oil or gas wells used to provide a seal between the outside of the production tubing and the inside of the casing, liner, or wellbore wall.

Based on their primary use, packers can be divided into two main categories: production packers and service packers. Production packers are those that remain in the well during well production. Service packers are used temporarily during well service activities such as cement squeezing, acidizing, fracturing and well testing.

It is usually run in close to the bottom end of the production tubing and set at a point above the top perforations or sand screens. In wells with multiple reservoir zones, packers are used to isolate the perforations for each zone. In these situations, a sliding sleeve would be used to select which zone to produce. Packers may also be used to protect the casing from pressure and produced fluids, isolate sections of corroded casing, casing leaks or squeezed perforations, and isolate or temporarily abandon producing zones. In water-flooding developments in which water is injected into the reservoir, packers are used in injection wells to isolate the zones into which the water must be injected.

There are occasions in which running a packer may not be desirable. High volume wells, for example, that are produced both up the tubing and annulus will not include a packer. Rod pumped wells are not normally run with packers because the associated gas is produced up the annulus. In general, well completions may not incorporate a packer when the annular space is used as a production conduit.

A production packer is designed to grip and seal against the casing ID. Gripping is accomplished with metal wedges called "slips." These components have sharpened, carburized teeth that dig into the metal of the casing. Sealing is accomplished with large, cylindrical rubber elements. In situations where the sealed pressure is very high (above 5,000 psi), metal rings are used on either side of the elements to prevent the rubber from extruding.

A packer is run in the casing on production tubing or wireline. Once the desired depth is reached, the slips and element must be expanded out to contact the casing. Axial loads are applied to push the slips up a ramp and to compress the element, causing it to expand outward. The axial loads are applied either hydraulically, mechanically, or with a slow burning chemical charge.

Most packers are "permanent" and require milling in order to remove them from the casing. The main advantages of permanent packers are lower cost and greater sealing and gripping capabilities.

In situations where a packer must be easily removed from the well, such as secondary recoveries, re-completions, or to change out the production tubing, a retrievable packer must be used. To unset the tool, either a metal ring is sheared or a sleeve is shifted to disengage connecting components. Retrievable packers have a more complicated design and generally lower sealing and gripping capabilities, but after removal and subsequent servicing, they can be reused.

== Applications ==
- Casing protection
- Separation of multiple zones
- Isolation packers
- Elimination of surging and heading
- Sub-surface safety control
- Artificial/gas lift
- Suspend the weight of tubing when there is compressive load on the tubing string

There are three types of packers: mechanical and hydraulic set and permanent. All packers fall into one or a combination of these.

Mechanical set packers are set by some form of tubing movement, usually a rotation or upward /downward motion.

Others can be weight set—the tubing weight can be used to compress and expand the sealing element. By a simple up string pull the packer is released. It is used best in shallow low pressure wells that are straight. It is not designed to withstand pressure differences unless a hydraulic hold down is incorporated.

Tension-set packers are set by pulling a tension on the tubing, slacking off releases the packer. Good for shallow wells with moderate pressure differences. The lower pressure helps to increase the setting force on the packer. Used in a stimulation well.

Rotation-set packer – Tubing rotation is used to set the packer to mechanically lock it in; a left-hand turn engages and a right-hand turn retrieves it.

Hydraulic-set packers use fluid pressure to drive the cone behind the slips. Once set they remain set by the use of either entrapped pressure or a mechanical lock. They are released by picking up the tubing. They are good for use in deviated or crooked holes where tubing movement is restricted or unwanted. The tubing can be hung in neutral tension.

Inflatable packers - use fluid pressure to inflate a long cylindrical tube of reinforced rubber to set the packer. Frequently used for open hole testing in exploration wells and for cement assurance in production wells. Also used in wells where the packer must pass through a restriction and then set at a much larger diameter in casing or open holes. Many variations for specific applications are available including those capable of withstanding high pressure differentials.

Permanent packers are run and set on an electric wireline, drill pipe or tubing. Opposed slips are positioned to lock it in compression. Once set this packer is resistant to motion for either direction. Wireline uses an electric current to detonate an explosive charge to set the packer. A release stud then frees the assembly form the packer. Tubing can be used by applying rotation or a pull or a combination of both. They are good in wells that have high pressure differentials or large tubing load variations and can be set precisely. They can be set the deepest.

Cement packers – In this case the tubing is cemented in place inside the casing or open hole. This type of packer is cheap.

== Factors affecting packers ==
Temperature and pressure can affect how the tubing and the packer behave as this could cause changes in the packer and tubing expansion rates. If the packer allows free motion then the tubing can elongate or shorten. If not the tensile and compressive forces can develop within.

== See also ==
- Production tubing
- Completion
