= Glossary of oilfield jargon =

Oilfield terminology refers to the jargon used by those working in fields within and related to the upstream segment of the petroleum industry. It includes words and phrases describing professions, equipment, and procedures specific to the industry. It may also include slang terms used by oilfield workers to describe the same.

== Terminology ==
- Bell nipple: An enlarged pipe at the top of a casing string that serves as a funnel to guide drilling tools into the top of the well.
- Big bear: A big bear is a hitch (see hitch) that lasts a minimum of 50 straight days.
- Black Leg : Joints of pipe racked back in the derrick.
- Blowout: A sudden, uncontrolled release of underground pressure from the well.
- BOP (Blowout preventer): Pronounced "B-O-P", not "bop", is a mechanical device connected to the wellhead to control and prevent blowouts.
- Catwalk: Elevated platform used for sliding pipe up to the rig floor.
- Chainhand (also motorman): An experienced laborer capable of maintaining most parts of the rig. The chainhand is in charge of throwing the chain to make up or break down pipe stands during tripping pipe. They are also responsible for maintaining the motors on the drilling rig
- Choke: Tool used to slow down the flow of liquid or gas.
- Cold vent: An area of the ocean floor where hydrogen sulfide, methane and other hydrocarbon-rich fluid seepage occurs, often in the form of a brine pool. Constitutes a biome supporting several endemic species. More commonly a "cold seep"
- Core sample: A cylindrical section of a naturally occurring medium consistent enough to hold a layered structure. Most cores are obtained by drilling into the medium, for example, sediment or rock, with a hollow steel tube called a corer
- Coring: A procedure where a small amount of rock sample is extracted from an oil well to the surface to give valuable information during the drilling process about the rock in the well.
- CSG (coal seam gas) or CBM (coal bed methane): Methane that forms in the gaps between coal molecules. (not to be confused with csg, an abbreviation for the well casing)
- Derrickman: The third in command after the driller & assistant driller; handles the top end of drill string on round trips.
- Dog-House: Room on drill floor with Knowledge box and Driller's paper work and tools. Driller's cyberchair is here on later generation rigs.
- Dog leg: A sharp deviation in the angle of the wellbore.
- Dope: A thick lubricant used on pipe connections.
- Drill string: A column, or string, of pipe that transmits drilling fluid (via the mud pumps) and torque (from the Kelly drive or top drive) to the drill bit.
- Driller: The crew supervisor on a drilling rig, working under the toolpusher.
- Elevator: A hinged mechanism that is closed around the drill pipe, or other tubular components, to facilitate lowering them into or lifting them out of the wellbore.
- Finger: A Finger is a person that has been in the field long enough to no longer be a worm but is not smart enough to be considered a Hand. i.e. Drill Finger, Frac Finger.
- Fish: The remnants still in the hole of a broken drill string, or any object that has been unintentionally dropped down the wellbore. Fishing is the act of using specialized tools to retrieve a fish.
- Floorhand: Laborer responsible for the overall maintenance of the rig.
- Frac hit: A frac hit is a form of interwell communication in which hydraulic fracturing on a new well forces high pressure fluids through a shared subsurface reservoir with offset (nearby producing wells), creating a pressure spike that can damage offset wellbores and impact production efficacy.
- Frac job: Slang term for hydraulic fracturing, a process whereby an oil or gas well is stimulated by pumping special fluids into the reservoir, fracturing the formation.
- Free point: The highest point at which the drill pipe is "free" or not stuck. Free-point tools are designed to measure torque and stretch in tubing, casings, and drill pipes and to provide accurate free pipe indication. A common method which involves deploying a wireline device to estimate the depth at which the pipe string is stuck. The pipe is then separated and all the pipe that is not stuck is pulled out of the hole. Fishing tools are then used to attempt to retrieve the stuck pipe.
- Geronimo: An escape device used by the derrickman to get down from his work platform in case of emergency ( Such as a fire or blowout. ).
- Ginzel: Slang term for a worker of the lowest "rank", often a rookie with no oilfield experience whatsoever.
- Hanger: Refers to several different tools. The casing hanger is the portion of a wellhead assembly which provides support for the casing string when it is lowered into the wellbore. The liner hanger is used to hang casing liners (casing strings that do not reach the surface) from the internal wall of a previous casing string. The instrument hanger is a downhole tool on which downhole gauges or instruments that are to be temporarily left in the wellbore are attached. The tubing hanger attaches to the topmost tubing joint in the wellhead to support the tubing string.
- Hitch: Rig employees refer to their work period as a hitch. A common hitch is 20 days on, followed by 10 days off. Typically, two crews will be on and each crew will spend one week working 7am-7pm and the following week 7pm-7am. Or, crews may do a full two weeks of 7am-7pm and then, upon returning after their 10 days off, will work the next two weeks 7pm-7am (the third rig crew being on their 10 days off). Some rigs may operate four crews; these crews typically work 28 days on, followed by 28 days off, and twelve hours shifts.
- Horner plot: A semi-log plot produced during pressure buildup analysis.
- Intelligent well: An oil or gas well equipped with monitoring equipment and completion components that allow for automatic or remote optimization of production.
- Joint: A length of pipe.
- Kelly: A square or hexagon pipe (approximately 40 ft (12 m) long) used to turn the drill string while drilling.
- Kick: An intrusion of pressurized fluid into the wellbore that causes drilling fluid to be displaced. It can be the precursor to a blowout.
- Kickoff: A planned deviation from vertical, executed at the bottom of the wellbore.
- Kill: The act of stopping a well from flowing.
- Monkey board: A platform high on the mast where the derrickman handles and aligns drill pipes.
- Moon pool: A space beneath the drill floor of an offshore rig open to the water below.
- Motorman: Responsible for maintaining all equipment on the rig to ensure smooth operation and minimal downtime.
- Mouse hole: A hole on the drilling rig floor used to hold the next joint of pipe to be added to the drill string.
- Mud: Slang term for drilling fluid. A "mud man" is the drilling fluids technician responsible for formulating the mud, while a "mud logger" checks mud cuttings from the drill bit for traces of rock or oil and gas that provide a picture of conditions downhole.
- Negative Pressure test: A test performed to determine the integrity of wells. Performed by exploration rigs prior to continuing on to other sites. A good test is one that starts at 0 psi, operated at 0 psi, and ends at 0 psi. Any test that does not start and end at 0, is considered a bad test.
- Nipple: Short length of pipe.
- Nipple-up: The act of installing a wellhead and/or B.O.P.
- Pay: A reservoir or portion of a reservoir containing hydrocarbons that can be economically produced, i.e. it is capable of "paying" an income. Also referred to as "pay sand" or the "pay zone".
- Petroleum play (or "play"): A group of oil prospects that are controlled by the same set of geological circumstances.
- Pig: A device inserted into a pipeline for cleaning purposes. The act of using a pig is called pigging.
- Piston corers: Advanced piston corer, extended core barrel systems
- Pressure core sampler: A tool designed to retrieve a sediment core sample while retaining the pressure at depth.
- Pull past Martin-Decker: Exert extreme tension on stuck pipe, so much so that the pointer needle revolves off-scale beyond the logo of a popular manufacturer of weight indicators, Martin-Decker.
- Pumper: A worker whose job is to monitor and maintain active oil and gas wells.
- Rat hole: A hole on the drilling rig floor used to store the kelly and swivel.
- Roughneck: an honor reserved for the top tier members of a drilling crew.
- Sidetrack: A planned deviation from a previously drilled section of the wellbore. (Sidetrack cement plug, whipstock, open hole sidetrack)
- Sliding: In directional drilling, sliding is used to describe a drilling interval in which rotary drilling (i.e., turning the entire drill string) is ceased and a mud motor is engaged to drive the drill bit and provide directional control. Because sliding significantly decreases rate of penetration, increases bit wear, and increases tortuosity, it is normally limited to drilling lateral sections of a horizontal well.
- Slips: Tool used to hold the weight of the drill string.
- Smart pig: An inline inspection tool inserted into a pipeline for defect inspection.
- Spud date: When drilling a new well, the spud date is the day on which the main drill bit begins drilling. For onshore drilling, spudding-in occurs after a wellsite has been prepared and a larger surface hole drilled and cased in preparation for the main drill bit to be used.
- Subsalt: Refers to oil prospects that lie below a salt layer.
- Toolhand: Refers to a third party (down hole services provider) service representative or field service supervisor with "tools" to be run and operated in a well.
- Toolpusher: The boss of a drilling rig, working under the drilling superintendent or the corporation the rig is contracted to.
- Tour: A worker's shift of duty. A drilling crew typically works a 12-hour tour every day of their hitch.
- Treater: The head supervisor on a hydraulic fracturing crew. Leads operations execution on location in conjunction with feedback from other supervisors, equipment operators, field engineers, and customers.
- Twist-off: The act of quitting your job with no notice and no good reason.
- V door: An opening at the floor level on one side of the derrick. It is used to move in equipment and tools such as casing and drill pipe.
- Water Transfer: The act of moving water from one location to another either to support drilling and completion activity when a well is being made or to remove flowback and produced water after the well has been made and oil and gas begin flowing back.
- Well logging: The practice of making a detailed record (well log) of the geologic formations penetrated by a borehole. Also known as borehole logging. Wireline logging is the practice of measuring formation properties using electrically powered instruments to infer properties and make decisions about drilling and production operations.
- Worm: An inexperienced oilfield worker who is not yet a "hand".

== See also ==
- List of acronyms in oil and gas exploration and production
