= Downhole oil–water separation technology =

Downhole oil–water separation (DOWS) technologies are apparatuses and methods that separate production fluids into a petroleum-rich stream and water-rich stream within an oil well. A DOWS system installed in a borehole will receive the fluids from an oil-producing zone in an oil reservoir and separate the mixture into a stream that is mostly water and a stream that is primarily crude oil and natural gas and direct the streams to different destinations. After the separation in the borehole, DOWS systems pump the petroleum-rich stream to the surface and inject the water-rich stream into a different zone or formation accessible to the same wellbore.

== Economics ==
An oil producing well is usually completed to pump all produced fluids to the surface where the fluids will be separated into their constituent components. In the early life of most oil producing wells, more petroleum will usually be produced than produced water. The produced water is considered to be wastewater that will need to be treated.

Over time, as the petroleum products are being depleted from the reservoir, the water cut (the ratio of water produced compared to the volume of total liquids produced) may increase. Or, when the field is undergoing secondary recovery with a waterflood, the water cut may become very high. Alternatively, the well may develop other problems requiring a workover. When the water cut becomes high, or when a workover is considered, the economics will be evaluated and may favor the installation of DOWS technology so that the waste water does not need to be treated at the surface. In those cases, the economics may favor injection of the produced water into a different permeable zone accessible to the borehole. However, not all oil wells are good candidates for deploying DOWS.

== Operation ==
The producing zone that a DOWS system is located in must be sealed from the other zones of the borehole by packers. This allows the intake of a DOWS system to receive the petroleum and water mixture. In some types of DOWS systems, a pump will force the received mixture through the oil/water separation system. In some DOWS systems, the pressure of the fluids in the borehole will be enough to force the water-rich stream into a permeable zone below the DOWS system. In other DOWS systems, a separate pump is needed to inject the water-rich stream into a permeable zone.

An artificial lift pump is used to lift the petroleum-rich stream to the surface.

DOWS systems do not entirely separate petroleum from water in the borehole. Instead, DOWS systems will decrease the amount of water brought to the surface. Some entrained droplets of water will be retained in the petroleum-rich stream, and some droplets of petroleum and dissolved gas will be entrained within the water-rich stream.

Trials have shown that a majority of properly operating DOWS systems may reduce the amount of water brought to the surface by around 75%. Research into further reducing the amount of water brought to the surface continues.

== Types ==
Two traditional types of DOWS systems have been developed. Initially, a gravity separation mechanism was developed. However, gravity separation requires time downhole for the components to separate, which results in lower production rates.

Hydrocyclone DOWS systems were developed to speed up the separation and production rate. Hydrocyclone type DOWS systems usually use electric submersible pumps to overcome any pressure head differential needed to inject water into another zone. Additionally, the supplemental draw of fluids into the wellbore by the pump has been known to increase the production of oil from some wells.

A new line of research is being pursued in which permeable membranes are deployed in the wellbore to separate water from the oil and gas.
