= Riserless Light Well Intervention =

Riserless Light Well Intervention (RLWI) enables the petroleum operators to increase the oil and gas recovery rate from subsea oil wells. The operation is performed through smaller dynamic positioned monohull vessels instead of larger mobile installations like traditional semisubmersible drilling rigs or drillships.

The RLWI enable subsea well intervention without having to use a drilling riser package connected to the subsea stack (blowout preventer system).

The technology is based on wireline well maintenance, where the cable is routed via a subsea lubricator system into the subsea well. Traditional activities are wireline operations for well logging, perforation, and installing or pulling equipment like plugs and downhole safety valve inserts. The operational envelope can be extended by use of tractors in horizontal wells.

The recovery rate has traditionally been considerably lower on a subsea well than for a surface platform well due more complicated well intervention and maintenance issues. RLWI enables the operators to perform intervention to increase the recovery rate at reduced time and cost.

There is a positive safety aspect by employing RLWI services as no hydrocarbons are transported to the vessel, but flushed back into the well through the lubricator system during normal operations. However, RLWI is a complex operation requiring special expertise and control in all phases of the preparation and implementation.
