= Erygmascope =

Precursor of modern optical borehole imager

Illustration of a Trouve Erygmascope in Scientific American, 1891

An erygmascope is a late 19th-century electric lighting apparatus designed for the examination of the strata of earth traversed by boring apparatus.

It consisted of a very powerful incandescent lamp enclosed in a metallic cylinder. One of the two semi-cylindrical sides constitutes the reflector, and the other, which is of thick glass, allows the passage of light, which illuminates the strata of earth traversed by the instrument. The base, which is inclined at an angle of 45°, is an elliptical mirror, and the top, of straight section, is open in order to permit the observer standing at the mouth of the well, and provided with a powerful spyglass, to see in the mirror the image of the geological layers or of the structure of crystalline rocks. It somewhat resembles to a kind of inverted semi-periscope aimed to look at earth downwards. The lamp is so mounted that its upwardly emitted rays are intercepted.

The whole apparatus was suspended from a long cable, formed of two conducting wires, which winds around a windlass with metallic journals which are electrically insulated. These journals communicate, through the intermedium of two friction springs, with the conductors on the one hand and, on the other, with the poles of a portable battery. This permits of lowering and raising the apparatus at will, without derangement, and without its being necessary to interrupt the light and the observation.

The erygmascope was described in an 1891 edition of the Scientific American Supplement; To what extent it was put to practical use is unknown.

== Etymology ==
The etymology of the term remains enigmatic, but could originate from a Greek word ήρυγμα meaning "trench". However, a shaft should be translated in Greek as πηγάδι (pegadi), and a water well as φρέαρ (phrear). The origin of the suffix scope is classical for an optical instrument: from σκοπεῖν (skopein), meaning to look at.

== In art and popular culture ==
Sonic and visual artistic collaboration between Tracy Hill, artist, Ralph Hoyte, poet and writer, and Phill Phelps, musician, working in partnership with Lancashire Wildlife Trust and City of Trees. It symbolizes the curiosity of the three artists for looking beyond the surface whilst working on their opus Stratum.

== See also ==
- Borehole image logs
- Optical borehole imager used for geological mapping and breakouts localization
- Well logging
