= Inflatable packer =

Downhole tool that seals a borehole section by inflating an elastomeric sleeve

An inflatable packer is a downhole tool used to seal sections of a borehole or well by inflating a reinforced elastomeric sleeve against the surrounding casing or rock wall. The term packer derives from the industry phrase "to pack off", meaning to seal off a section of a well or borehole. The device, typically set by applying pneumatic or hydraulic pressure from the surface, provides temporary or permanent zonal isolation and is employed in oil and gas operations, hydrogeology, mining, geotechnical investigations, civil engineering, and environmental monitoring. Inflatable packers can expand to a greater extent than most mechanical packers, enabling their use in a wide array of applications.

== History ==
Packers were first introduced in the early twentieth century as mechanical devices for isolating zones in oil and gas wells. In 1933, Swiss engineer Maurice Lugeon introduced what became known as the Lugeon test, which used a dual inflatable packer system to measure the permeability of fractured rock in dam foundations. By the mid-twentieth century, organizations such as the U.S. Geological Survey (USGS) and the U.S. Bureau of Reclamation (USBR) had incorporated inflatable packers into programs for aquifer testing, dam-site characterization, and grouting studies.

In the oilfield sector, Lynes Inc. pioneered inflatable packer designs in the late 1940s and early 1950s, securing U.S. patents including "Hydraulically Inflatable Packer" (issued in 1953) for zonal isolation and remedial cementing applications. Completion Tool Company (CTC) contributed subsequent innovations, patenting inflatable packer systems during the early 1980s. Over the following decades, advances in elastomer formulations, reinforcement methods, and vulcanization techniques enhanced packer durability, enabled multiple inflation cycles, and improved sealing reliability across oilfield operations.

Historically, Lynes Inc. and CTC were among the first companies to commercialize inflatable packers, although neither continues to operate independently. Since then, manufacturing has been taken up by both large oilfield service companies and specialized engineering firms. Multinational providers such as Schlumberger and Baker Hughes supply inflatable systems as part of oilfield well-completion and stimulation services, while specialist firms such as Inflatable Packers International (IPI) design and manufacture packers for a broader set of industries - including oil and gas, mining, groundwater, geotechnical and tunnelling civil work.

== Design and operation ==
An inflatable packer is constructed from three principal components: a central mandrel, a reinforced inflatable element, and a set of end fittings and valves. The mandrel, usually made of steel, provides structural strength and fluid pathways for tools or fluids. Surrounding it is the inflatable element, an elastomeric sleeve reinforced with high-strength materials such as steel wire, aramid, or polyester, which expands outward when pressurized. This elastomeric sleeve is, in some designs, further segmented into a separate inner tube (sometimes called a boot), a layer of reinforcement and an external elastomeric cover. Such 3-part construction is common for inflatable packers used in oilfield applications. The end fittings secure the element to the tool string and are connected to the ports and valves that control inflation and deflation.

A variety of reinforcement architectures are used in inflatable elements, selected to balance differential-pressure capacity, expansion ratio and reusability. Traditional metal-slat constructions place longitudinal slats between an inner bladder and an outer cover. Hybrids combine slats with weave/mesh or dedicated anti-extrusion layers to control growth and resist damage in high-pressure service. Alternative designs embed cables/cords or braided wire within the elastomer to form hose-type elements that are flexible and economical for moderate pressures. More recent composite approaches use contra-wound helical layers to distribute inflation stresses and improve recovery; depending on corrosion and weight requirements the reinforcement may be steel wire or non-metallic fibres such as carbon fibre, aramid (Kevlar™) or polyester. Manufacturers also offer fully reinforced elements (as opposed to end-reinforced types) to mitigate extrusion into irregular boreholes.

In operation, hydraulic or pneumatic fluid - commonly water, drilling mud, oil, nitrogen gas, or (for external casing/annulus packers) cement slurry - is pumped into the inflation chamber, pressurizing the inside of the elastomeric sleeve and causing it to expand radially until it seals tightly against the casing or borehole wall. In some cases, the seal can later be released by deflation, allowing the tool to be repositioned or retrieved. Packers may be deployed singly, isolating the sections above from below the tool or in pairs, known as straddle or double packers, which enclose a separate interval between two elements. More complex systems may use multiple packers within a single borehole to create segmented arrays. High-pressure models can withstand inflation pressures greater than 70 MPa (10,000psi) and can be operated at depths exceeding 3000 meters (10,000 ft).

=== Variants ===
While most inflatable packers expand outward to seal against the borehole or casing, specialized tools also exist that inflate inward to restrict an internal annulus. Examples include compact inward-inflating annular diverters used in mineral coring to divert returns or isolate sections within a coring assembly.

== Applications ==
=== Oil and gas ===
Inflatable packers are used for drill stem testing, zonal isolation, hydraulic fracturing, acid stimulation, sand control, gravel packing, and remedial cementing in wells where mechanical packers are less effective.

=== Hydrogeology and geotechnical engineering ===
They are applied in permeability and pressure tests, including the Lugeon test (introduced in 1933 by Maurice Lugeon), as well as in falling-head and constant-head tests, tracer experiments, and discrete groundwater sampling. The USGS and USBR adopted them for dam foundation studies, aquifer testing, and slope stability investigations.

=== Mining and environmental applications ===
In mining, inflatable packers are used for groundwater management, fracture grouting, hydraulic fracturing and ventilation shaft liner grouting. In environmental monitoring, they isolate specific borehole intervals for water quality monitoring and sampling and controlled injection or pumping tests.

== Limitations ==
Inflatable packers have several operational constraints. The elastomeric element can be damaged or punctured in highly abrasive or fractured formations, which may reduce sealing effectiveness. Because they rely on internal fluid pressure to expand, maintaining adequate inflation pressure is essential for reliable performance. In applications that require very high mechanical anchoring forces, inflatable packers generally provide less holding strength than conventional mechanical packers.

== See also ==
- Well completion
- Drill stem test
- Hydraulic fracturing
- Well logging
