= Well services =

Well services is a department within a petroleum production company through which matters concerning existing wells are handled. Having a shared well services department for all (or at least multiple) assets operated by a company is seen as advantageous as it allows the pooling of talent, experience and resources for managing wells.

The term may sometimes be used to encompass the larger section of the industry responsible for wells including the supplier companies as well the operating company's wells department.

== Remit ==
A well is initially drilled and completed under the control of the drilling and completions department operating under the request of the asset. Once the well is completed, control is transferred to the asset's production team, who will operate the well as appropriate for their purposes. Should any issues of well integrity or any requirement for well work arise, the asset will refer the issue to the well services. During interventions, control of affected well is handed over from production to the well services crew at the well site, a practical action involving transferring control lines from the production control panel to the well services control panel.

== Structure ==
=== Offshore/Well site ===
When well work is required, it is the responsibility of the Well Operations Engineer (WOE) to assemble the team and arrange their dispatch to the well site. The team will consist of a well services supervisor and other operators. The well services supervisor is a dedicated worker who is sent to oversee well services operations at well sites and take responsibility for all well services personnel. At offshore sites, there will commonly be two, to cover both day shift and night shift. The other operators will usually consist of personnel from supplier companies, who are trained in the relevant field, such as wireline, coiled tubing, wellhead maintenance, etc.

== See also ==
- Well intervention
- List of oilfield service companies
