= Borehole image logs =

Data logging method

Borehole imaging logs are logging and data-processing methods used to produce two-dimensional, centimeter-scale images of a borehole wall and the rocks that make it up. These tools are limited to the open-hole environment. The applications where images are useful cover the full range of the exploration and production cycle from exploration through appraisal, development, and production to abandonment and sealing.

Specific applications are sedimentology, structural geology/tectonics, reservoir geomechanics and drilling, reservoir engineering.

The tools can be categorized in a number of ways: simple optical borehole imaging (OBI) systems, energy source (electrical, acoustic, or nuclear with gamma rays or neutron); conveyance (wireline or logging while drilling); and type of drilling mud (water-based mud or oil-based mud).

== See also ==
- Erygmascope – Precursor of modern optical borehole imager for geological mapping and breakouts localization
- List of abbreviations in oil and gas exploration and production
