= Gas initially in place =

Gas initially in place (GIIP) or original gas in place (OGIP) denote the total estimated quantity (volume) of natural gas contained in a "subsurface" asset prior to extraction (production).

Gas Initially In Place = Gross Rock Volume * Net/Gross * Porosity * average initial Gas Saturation / Formation Volume Factor
