= Drill stem test =

Oil drilling test

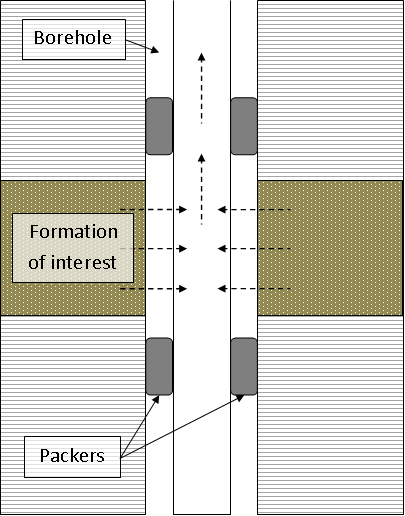
Drill stem test

A drill stem test (DST) is a procedure for isolating and testing the pressure, permeability and productive capacity of a geological formation during the drilling of a well. The test is an important measurement of pressure behaviour at the drill stem and is a valuable way of obtaining information on the formation fluid and establishing whether a well has found a commercial hydrocarbon reservoir.

== History ==
Working in El Dorado, Arkansas, in the 1920s, E.C. Johnston and his brother M.O. Johnston developed the first drill stem tester and ran the first commercial drill stem test in 1926. In April 1929, the Johnston Formation Testing Corporation was granted a patent and they subsequently refined the testing system in the early 1930s.

In the 1950s, Schlumberger introduced a method for testing formations using wireline. The Schlumberger formation-testing tool, placed in operation in 1953, fired a shaped charge through a rubber pad that had been expanded in the hole until it was securely fixed in the hole at the depth required. Formation fluids flowed through the perforation and connecting tubing into a container housed inside the tool. When filled, the container was closed, sealing the fluid sample at the formation pressure. The tool was then brought to the surface, where the sample could be examined. In 1956, Schlumberger acquired Johnston Testers and continues to perform drill stem tests and wireline formation tests in both open and cased holes.

== About drill stem testing ==
Drill stem testing is an oil and gas exploration procedure to isolate, stimulate, and flow a downhole formation to determine the fluids present and the rate at which they can be produced. The main objective of a DST is to evaluate the commercial viability of a zone's economic potential by identifying productive capacity, pressure, permeability, or extent of an oil or gas reservoir. These tests can be performed in both open and cased hole environments and provide exploration teams with valuable information about the nature of the reservoir.

Drill stem testing involves deploying a series of tools known as a test bottom hole assembly (BHA). A basic drill stem test BHA consist of a packer or packers, which act as an expanding plug to be used to isolate sections of the well for the testing process, valves that may be opened or closed from the surface during the test, and recorders used to document pressure during the test. In addition to packers, a downhole valve is used to open and close the formation to measure reservoir characteristics such as pressure and temperature which are charted on downhole recorders within the BHA. Two types of BHA DST are cased hole, which can be applied after the well has been cased, and open hole, which may be performed before casing.

== Applications of drill stem testing ==
=== Cased hole stimulation ===
Performed after the well is cased, cased hole drill stem testing uses a retrievable production packer that is set above the zone of interest. The well is then flow tested through perforations in the casing. The two types of cased hole testing are pressure operated and mechanically operated.

=== Open hole ===
Because it's performed before casing is run, open hole drill stem testing can be the most economical way to determine productive capacity, pressure, permeability or the extent of an oil or gas reservoir. The testing equipment is run into the well and the zone of interest is isolated using inflate or compression-set packers, depending on your requirements and drilling conditions.

=== Alternate procedures ===
Depending on testing objectives and scope of work, drill stem testing may also be performed in combination with various other exploration and completion process such as fluid loss control and well control, closed chamber tests, well stimulation, and a combination of DST and TCP.

== Procedure ==
During normal well drilling, drilling mud is pumped through the drill stem and out of the drill bit. In a drill stem test, the drill bit is removed and replaced with the DST tool and devices are inflated above and below the section to be tested. These devices are known as packers and are used to make a seal between the borehole wall and the drill pipe, isolating the region of interest. A valve is opened, reducing the pressure in the drill stem to surface pressure, causing fluid to flow out of the packed-off formation and up to the surface.

== Results ==
In a low permeability or low pressure formation, surface production may not be achieved but the volume and flow rate of fluid can still be analysed within the drill stem.

== See also ==
- Halliburton
- Drilling rig
- Oil well
- Schlumberger
- Expro
