= Sliding sleeve =

A sliding sleeve is a standard component for the completion of an oil or gas well. Their main uses are to shut off flow from one or more reservoir zones or to regulate pressure between zones.

There are two main categories of sliding sleeves: open/close and choking. Open/close sleeves are shifted between a full open position and a closed position. They are used to shut off flow from a zone for economic reasons or to shut off a zone that is depleting or producing too much water. In multi-zone wells, they are used to regulate which zones to produce from and which ones to shut off. Mechanically actuated sleeves are simple and inexpensive but require actuation by a "lock," which must be run in the well on wireline or coiled tubing. Hydraulically actuated sleeves are more complicated but can be actuated from a small pump at surface. King sleeves can be used to regulate the pressure between two or more zones. They are also used to regulate the flow of fluid into a well during proppant fracturing or hydraulic fracturing operations. Choking sleeves are all hydraulically actuated and have a much more complex design than open/close sleeves.

== Operation ==
A separation tool is pinned in the open position when run by slickline. This provides a flow path through the center of the tool while it is being set in the sliding sleeve.

The separation tool adapts to most manufacturers' locks to match the nipple profile in the sliding sleeve. The lock and separation tool assembly are installed with the appropriate running tool and prong.

When production is desired from an upper zone while blanking off the lower zone, a sliding sleeve with a nipple profile above and a polished sub below is installed in the tubing string opposite the upper zone. Packers are used to isolate the zones.

The sliding sleeve can be shifted to the open position and the separation tool can be run and locked into the bore of the sliding sleeve by standard slickline methods. The separation tool allows flow to enter from the annulus and produce up the tubing. The tool blanks off the tubing below the sleeve to isolate the lower zone.

The separation tool assembly is run on an appropriate running tool complete with a running prong. The running prong is connected to the top of the internal seal prong with a shear pin, and the running tool is attached to the lock in the normal manner. After locating the sliding sleeve, the operator jars downward to set the lock, then pulls upward to close the isolation plug in the separation tool. As this happens, a garter spring in the isolation plug moves a steel shear pin into a groove on the sealing prong, and an O-ring on the internal prong seals to isolate the tubing below the sliding sleeve. The running prong that is pinned to the top of the internal prong is then sheared, and the slickline toolstring may be withdrawn from the well.
