= Vertical seismic profile =

Vibration measurement using boreholes

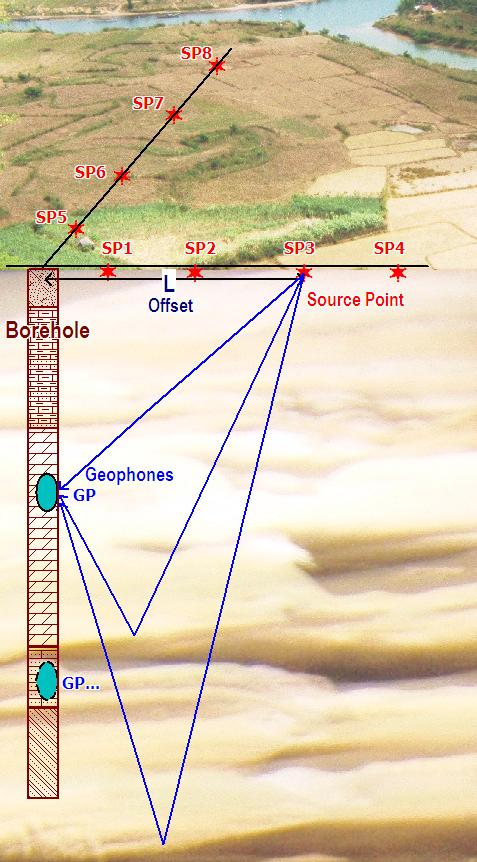
Layout of a Vertical Seismic Profile Station

In geophysics, vertical seismic profile (VSP) is a technique of seismic measurements used for correlation with surface seismic data. The defining characteristic of a VSP (of which there are many types) is that either the energy source, or the detectors (or sometimes both) are in a borehole. In the most common type of VSP, hydrophones, or more often geophones or accelerometers, in the borehole record reflected seismic energy originating from a seismic source at the surface.

There are numerous methods for acquiring a vertical seismic profile (VSP). Zero-offset VSPs (A) have sources close to the wellbore directly above receivers. Offset VSPs (B) have sources some distance from the receivers in the wellbore. Walkaway VSPs (C) feature a source that is moved to progressively farther offset and receivers held in a fixed location. Walk-above VSPs (D) accommodate the recording geometry of a deviated well, having each receiver in a different lateral position and the source directly above the receiver. Salt-proximity VSPs (E) are reflection surveys to help define a salt-sediment interface near a wellbore by using a source on top of a salt dome away from the drilling rig. Drill-noise VSPs (F), also known as seismic-while-drilling (SWD) VSPs, use the noise of the drill bit as the source and receivers laid out along the ground. Multi-offset VSPs (G) involve a source some distance from numerous receivers in the wellbore.

A vertical seismic profile is constructed to identify a value known as a source wavelet. This is useful when it comes to a process known as deconvolution. Deconvolution allows for a more readable and more focused VSP. The idea is that the VSP reports any abnormal seismic activity and deconvolution allows for a more focused profile on these abnormal activities. VSPs are used to measure a seismic signal at depth and with that measurement the wavelength at the source of the seismic activity is easily found. With the measurement of the source wavelet, geophysicists can carry out deconvolution on the VSP and decrease the reports of all seismic activity and limit the reports to just abnormal or extreme changes in seismic activity.

In recent years, using a VSP has become more popular in regards to reducing well placement risks as well as improving the monitoring of such wells. The advancement in technology for well monitoring has made VSPs more accurate and more precise with the use of very long baseline interferometry (VLBI). VLBI is an astronomical radio antenna technique that allows for high resolution imaging on a spatial scale. Therefore, using these techniques to create a seismic profile produces incredibly accurate images of wavelets and enhances determination of source wavelets. VSPs are more suitable than other seismic profiles to host the equipment for VLBI. The long vertical length required to create a borehole for a VSP allows for the equipment of a VLBI to analyze data within a larger region. VLBI can produce high resolution results within a region upwards of 50 km.
