= Tubing hanger =

A tubing hanger is a component used in the completion of oil and gas production wells. It is set in the tree or the wellhead and suspends the production tubing and/or casing. Sometimes it provides porting to allow the communication of hydraulic, electric and other downhole functions, as well as chemical injection. It also serves to seal-in the annulus and production areas.
