= Completion (oil and gas wells) =

Last operation for oil and gas wells

Well completion is the process of making a well ready for production (or injection) after drilling operations. This principally involves preparing the bottom of the hole to the required specifications, running in the production tubing and its associated down hole tools as well as perforating and stimulating as required. Sometimes, the process of running in and cementing the casing is also included. After a well has been drilled, should the drilling fluids be removed, the well would eventually close in upon itself. Casing ensures that this will not happen while also protecting the wellstream from outside incumbents, like water or sand.

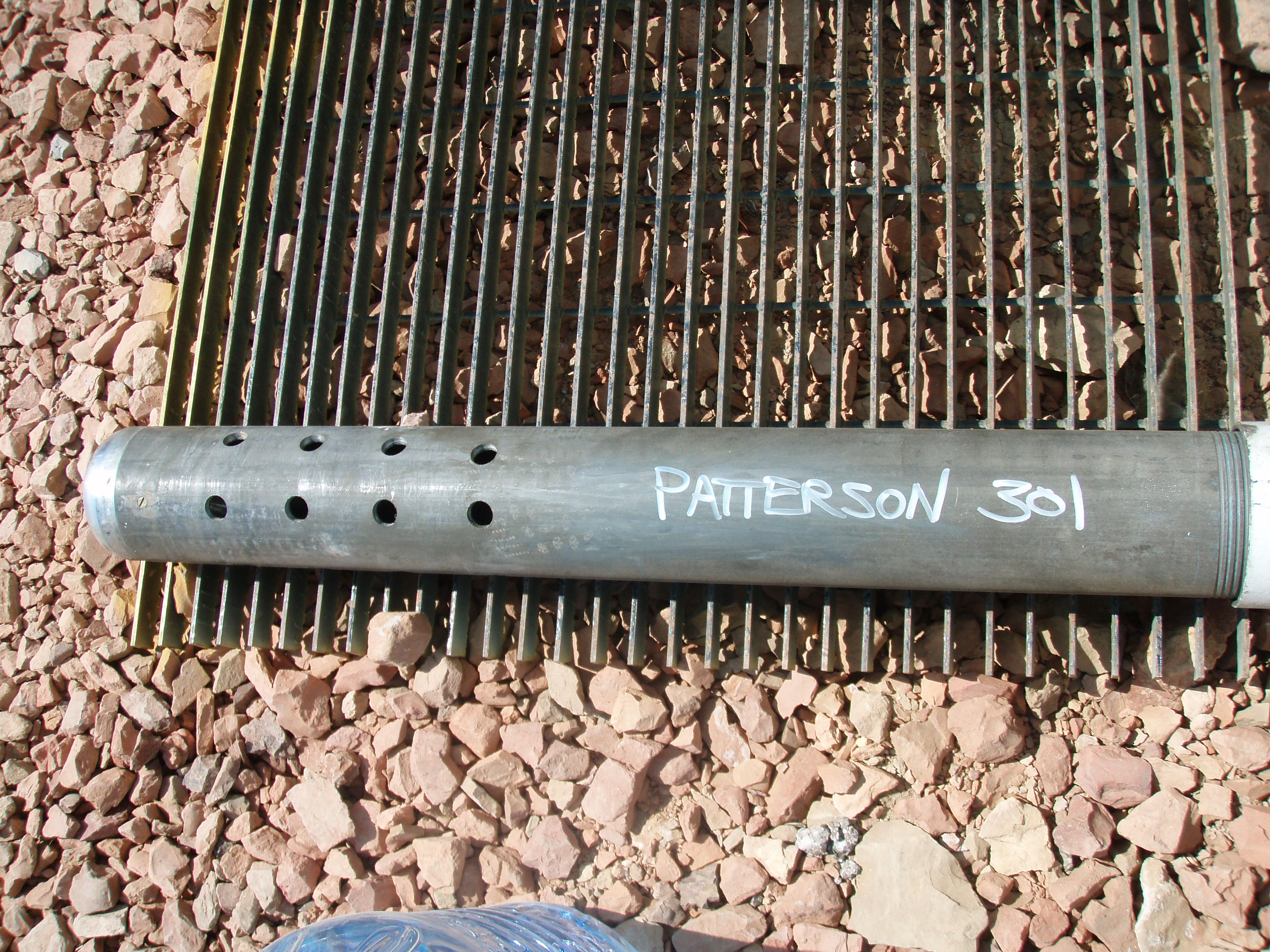
Perforated shoe

== Lower completion (downhole completion) ==
This refers to the portion of the well across the production or injection zone. The well designer has many tools and options available to design the lower completion (downhole completion) according to the conditions of the reservoir. Typically, the lower completion is set across the productive zone using a liner hanger system, which anchors the lower completion to the production casing string. The broad categories of lower completion are listed below.

=== Barefoot completion ===
This type is the most basic, but can be a good choice for hard rock, multi-laterals and underbalance drilling. It involves leaving the productive reservoir section without any tubulars. This effectively removes control of flow of fluids from the formation; it is not suitable for weaker formations which might require sand control, nor for formations requiring selective isolation of oil, gas and water intervals. However, advances in interventions such as coiled tubing and tractors means that barefoot wells can be successfully produced.

=== Open hole ===
The production casing is set above the zone of interest before drilling the zone. The zone is open to the well bore. In this case little expense is generated with perforations. Log interpretation is not critical. The well can be deepened easily and it is easily converted to screen and liner. However, excessive gas and water production is difficult to control, and may require frequent clean outs. Also the interval cannot be selectively stimulated.

=== Open hole completion ===
This designation refers to a range of completions where no casing or liner is cemented in place across the production zone. In competent formations, the zone might be left entirely bare, but some sort of sand-control and/or flow-control means are usually incorporated.

Openhole completions have seen significant uptake in recent years, and there are many configurations, often developed to address specific reservoir challenges. There have been many recent developments that have boosted the success of openhole completions, and they also tend to be popular in horizontal wells, where cemented installations are more expensive and technically more difficult. The common options for openhole completions are:

==== Pre-holed liner ====
Also often called pre-drilled liner. The liner is prepared with multiple small drilled holes, then set across the production zone to provide wellbore stability and an intervention conduit. Pre-holed liner is often combined with openhole packers, such as swelling elastomers, mechanical packers or external casing packers, to provide zonal segregation and isolation. It is now quite common to see a combination of pre-holed liner, solid liner and swelling elastomer packers to provide an initial isolation of unwanted water or gas zones. Multiple sliding sleeves can also be used in conjunction with openhole packers to provide considerable flexibility in zonal flow control for the life of the wellbore.

This type of completion is also being adopted in some water injection wells, although these require a much greater performance envelope for openhole packers, due to the considerable pressure and temperature changes that occur in water injectors.

Openhole completions (in comparison with cemented pipe) require better understanding of formation damage, wellbore clean-up and fluid loss control. A key difference is that perforating penetrates through the first 6–18 inches (15–46 centimetres) of formation around the wellbore, whilst openhole completions require the reservoir fluids to flow through all of the filtrate-invaded zone around the wellbore and lift-off of the mud filter cake.

Many openhole completions will incorporate fluid loss valves at the top of the liner to provide well control whilst the upper completion is run.

There are an increasing number of ideas coming into the market place to extend the options for openhole completions; for example, electronics can be used to actuate a self-opening or self-closing liner valve. This might be used in an openhole completion to improve clean-up, by bringing the well onto production from the toe-end for 100 days, then self-opening the heel-end. Inflow control devices and intelligent completions are also installed as openhole completions.

Pre-holed liner may provide some basic control of solids production, where the wellbore is thought to fail in aggregated chunks of rubble, but it is not typically regarded as a sand control completion.

==== Slotted liner ====
Slotted liners can be selected as an alternative to pre-holed liner, sometimes as a personal preference or from established practice on a field. It can also be selected to provide a low cost control of sand/solids production. The slotted liner is machined with multiple longitudinal slots, for example 2 mm × 50 mm, spread across the length and circumference of each joint. Recent advances in laser cutting means that slotting can now be done much cheaper to much smaller slot widths and in some situation slotted liner is now used for the same functionality as sand control screens.

==== Openhole sand control ====
This is selected where the liner is required to mechanically hold back the movement of formation sand. There are many variants of openhole sand control, the three popular choices being stand-alone screens, openhole gravel packs (also known as external gravel packs, where a sized sand 'gravel' is placed as an annulus around the sand control screen) and expandable screens. Screen designs are mainly wire-wrap or premium; wire-wrap screens use spiral-welded corrosion-resistant wire wrapped around a drilled basepipe to provide a consistent small helical gap (such as 0.012-inch (0.30 mm), termed 12 gauge). Premium screens use a woven metal cloth wrapped around a basepipe. Expandable screens are run to depth before being mechanically swaged to a larger diameter. Ideally, expandable screens will be swaged until they contact the wellbore wall.

==== Horizontal open hole completions ====
This is the most common open hole completion used today. It is basically the same described on the vertical open hole completion but on a horizontal well it enlarges significantly the contact with the reservoir, increasing the production or injection rates of your well. Sand control on a horizontal well is completely different from a vertical well. We can no longer rely on the gravity for the gravel placement. Most service companies uses an alpha and beta wave design to cover the total length of the horizontal well with gravel. It's known that very long wells (around 6000 ft) were successfully gravel packed in many occasions, including deepwater reservoirs in Brazil.

=== Liner completions ===
In this case the casing is set above the primary zone. An un-cemented screen and liner assembly is installed across the pay section. This technique minimizes formation damage and gives the ability to control sand. It also makes cleanout easy. Perforating expense is also low to non-existent. However, gas and water build up is difficult to control and selective stimulation not possible the well can't be easily deepened and additional rig time may be needed.

=== Perforated liner ===
Casing is set above the producing zone, the zone is drilled and the liner casing is cemented in place. The liner is then perforated for production. This time additional expense in perforating the casing is incurred, also log interpretation is critical and it may be difficult to obtain good quality cement jobs.

=== Perforated casing ===
Production casing is cemented through the zone and the pay section is selectively perforated. Gas and water are easily controlled as is sand. The formation can be selectively stimulated and the well can be deepened. This selection is adaptable to other completion configurations and logs are available to assist casing decisions. Much better primary casing. It can however cause damage to zones and needs good log interpretation. The perforating cost can be very high.

=== Cased hole completion ===
This involves running casing and a liner down through the production zone, and cementing it in place. Connection between the well bore and the formation is made by perforating. Because perforation intervals can be precisely positioned, this type of completion affords good control of fluid flow, although it relies on the quality of the cement to prevent fluid flow behind the liner. As such it is the most common form of completion.

=== Conventional completions ===
- Casing flow: means that the producing fluid flow has only one path to the surface through the casing.
- Casing and tubing flow: means that there is tubing within the casing that allows fluid to reach the surface. This tubing can be used as a kill string for chemical injection. The tubing may have a "no-go" nipple at the end as a means of pressure testing.
- Pumping flow: the tubing and pump are run to a depth beneath the working fluid. The pump and rod string are installed concentrically within the tubing. A tubing anchor prevents tubing movement while pumping.
- Tubing flow: a tubing string and a production packer are installed. The packer means that all the flow goes through the tubing. Within the tubing you can mount a combination of tools that will help to control fluid flow through the tubing.
- Gas lift well: gas is fed into valves installed in mandrels in the tubing strip. The hydrostatic head is lowered and the fluid is gas lifted to the surface.
- Single-well alternate completions: in this instance there is a well with two zones. In order to produce from both the zones are isolated with packers. Blast joints may be used on the tubing within the region of the perforations. These are thick walled subs that can withstand the fluid abrasion from the producing zone. This arrangement can also work if you have to produce from a higher zone given the depletion of a lower zone. The tubing may also have flow control mechanism.
- Single-well concentric kill string: within the well a small diameter concentric kill string is used to circulate kill fluids when needed.
- Single-well 2-tubing completion: in this instance 2 tubing strings are inserted down 1 well. They are connected at the lower end by a circulating head. Chemicals can be circulated down one tube and production can continue up the other.

== Completion components ==
The upper completion refers to all components from the bottom of the production tubing upwards. Proper design of this "completion string" is essential to ensure the well can flow properly given the reservoir conditions and to permit any operations as are deemed necessary for enhancing production and safety.

=== Wellhead with situation control ===
This is the pressure containing equipment at the surface of the well where casing strings are suspended and the blowout preventer or Christmas tree is connected.

=== Christmas tree ===
This is the main assembly of valves that controls flow from the well to the process plant (or the other way round for injection wells) and allows access for chemical squeezes and well interventions.

=== Tubing hanger ===
This component sits in the upper portion of the wellhead, within the tubing head flange and serves as the main support for the production tubing. The tubing hanger may be manufactured with rubber or polymer sealing rings to isolate the tubing from the annulus. The tubing hanger is secured within the tubing head flange with lag bolts. These lag bolts apply a downward pressure on the tubing hanger to compress the sealing gaskets and to prevent the tubing from being hydrostatically or mechanically ejected from the annulus.

=== Production tubing ===
Production tubing is the main conduit for transporting hydrocarbons from the reservoir to surface (or injection material the other way). It runs from the tubing hanger at the top of the wellhead down to a point generally just above the top of the production zone. Production tubing is available in various diameters, typically ranging from 2 inches to 4.5 inches. Production tubing may be manufactured using various grades of alloys to achieve specific hardness, corrosion resistance or tensile strength requirements. Tubing may be internally coated with various rubber or plastic coatings to enhance corrosion and/or erosion resistance.

=== Downhole safety valve (DHSV) ===
This component is intended as a last-resort method of protecting the surface from the uncontrolled release of hydrocarbons. It is a cylindrical valve with either a ball or flapper closing mechanism. It is installed in the production tubing and is held in the open position by a high-pressure hydraulic line from surface contained in a 6.35 mm (1/4 in) control line that is attached to the DHSV's hydraulic chamber and terminated at surface to a hydraulic actuator. The high pressure is needed to overcome the production pressure in the tubing upstream of the choke on the tree. The valve will operate if the umbilical HP line is cut or the wellhead/tree is destroyed.

This valve allows fluids to pass up or be pumped down the production tubing. When closed the DHSV forms a barrier in the direction of hydrocarbon flow, but fluids can still be pumped down for well kill operations. It is placed as far below the surface as is deemed safe from any possible surface disturbance including cratering caused by the wipeout of the platform. Where hydrates are likely to form (most production is at risk of this), the depth of the SCSSV (surface-controlled, sub-surface safety valve) below the seabed may be as much as 1 km: this will allow for the geothermal temperature to be high enough to prevent hydrates from blocking the valve.

=== Annular safety valve ===
On wells with gas lift capability, many operators consider it prudent to install a valve, which will isolate the A annulus for the same reasons a DHSV may be needed to isolate the production tubing in order to prevent the inventory of natural gas downhole from becoming a hazard as it became on Piper Alpha.

=== Side pocket mandrel ===
This is a welded/machined product which contains a "side pocket" alongside the main tubular conduit. The side pocket, typically 1" or 1½" diameter is designed to contain gas lift valve, which allows flow of High pressure gas into the tubing there by reducing the tubing pressure and allowing the hydrocarbons to move upwards.

=== Electrical submersible pump ===
This device is used for artificial lift to help provide energy to drive hydrocarbons to surface if reservoir pressure is insufficient. Electrical Submersible Pumps, or ESPs, are installed at the bottom of the production tubing or inside the production tubing (Through Tubing ESP). Being electrically powered, ESPs require an electrical communications conduit to be run from surface, through a specialized wellhead and tubing hanger, to provide the required power to function. During installation, the power cable is spliced into the ESP then attached to the outside of the tubing by corrosion resistant metal bands as it is run in the hole. Specialized guards, called cannon guards, may be installed over each tubing collar to prevent the cable from rubbing on the casing walls which can cause premature cable failure. Installation and workover processes require careful consideration to prevent any damage to the power cable. Like many other artificial lift methods, the ESP reduces the bottom hole pressure at the tubing bottom to allow hydrocarbons to flow into the tubing.

=== Landing nipple ===
A completion component fabricated as a short section of heavy wall tubular with a machined internal surface that provides a seal area and a locking profile. Landing nipples are included in most completions at predetermined intervals to enable the installation of flow-control devices, such as plugs and chokes. Three basic types of landing nipple are commonly used: no-go nipples, selective-landing nipples and ported or safety-valve nipples.

=== Sliding sleeve ===
The sliding sleeve is hydraulically or mechanically actuated to allow communication between the tubing and the 'A' annulus. They are often used in multiple reservoir wells to regulate flow to and from the zones.

=== Production packer ===
The packer isolates the annulus between the tubing and the inner casing and the foot of the well. This is to stop reservoir fluids from flowing up the full length of the casing and damaging it. It is generally placed close to the foot of the tubing, shortly above the production zone.

=== Downhole gauges ===
This is an electronic or fiberoptic sensor to provide continuous monitoring of downhole pressure and temperature. Gauges either use a 1/4" control line clamped onto the outside of the tubing string to provide an electrical or fiberoptic communication to surface, or transmit measured data to surface by acoustic signal in the tubing wall. The information obtained from these monitoring devices can be used to model reservoirs or predict the life or problems in a specific wellbore.

=== Perforated joint ===
This is a length of tubing with holes punched into it. If used, it will normally be positioned below the packer and will offer an alternative entry path for reservoir fluids into the tubing in case the shoe becomes blocked, for example, by a stuck perforation gun.

=== Formation isolation valve ===
This component, placed towards the foot of the completion string, is used to provide two way isolation from the formation for completion operations without the need for kill weight fluids. Their use is sporadic as they do not enjoy the best reputation for reliability when it comes to opening them at the end of the completion process.

=== Centralizer ===
In highly deviated wells, this component may be included towards the foot of the completion. It consists of a large collar, which keeps the completion string centralised within the hole while cementing.

=== Wireline entry guide ===
This component is often installed at the end of the tubing, or "the shoe". It is intended to make pulling out wireline tools easier by offering a guiding surface for the toolstring to re-enter the tubing without getting caught on the side of the shoe.

== Perforating and stimulating ==
In cased hole completions (the majority of wells), once the completion string is in place, the final stage is to make a connection between the wellbore and the formation. This is done by running perforation guns to blast holes in the casing or liner to make a connection. Modern perforations are made using shaped explosive charges, similar to the armor-penetrating charge used on antitank rockets (bazookas).

Sometimes once the well is fully completed, further stimulation is necessary to achieve the planned productivity. There are a number of stimulation techniques.

=== Acidizing ===
This involves the injection of chemicals to eat away at any skin damage, "cleaning up" the formation, thereby improving the flow of reservoir fluids. A strong acid (usually hydrochloric acid) is used to dissolve rock formations, but this acid does not react with the Hydrocarbons. As a result, the Hydrocarbons are more accessible. Acid can also be used to clean the wellbore of some scales that form from mineral laden produced water.

=== Fracturing ===
This means creating and extending fractures from the perforation tunnels deeper into the formation, increasing the surface area for formation fluids to flow into the well, as well as extending past any possible damage near the wellbore. This may be done by injecting fluids at high pressure (hydraulic fracturing), injecting fluids laced with round granular material (proppant fracturing), or using explosives to generate a high pressure and high speed gas flow (TNT or PETN up to 1,900,000 psi (13,000,000 kPa) ) and (propellant stimulation up to 4,000 psi (28,000 kPa) ).

=== Acidizing and fracturing (combined method) ===
This involves use of explosives and injection of chemicals to increase acid-rock contact.

=== Nitrogen circulation ===
Sometimes, productivity may be hampered due to the residue of completion fluids, heavy brines, in the wellbore. This is particularly a problem in gas wells. In these cases, coiled tubing may be used to pump nitrogen at high pressure into the bottom of the borehole to circulate out the brine.

== See also ==
- Oil well – Well drilled to extract crude oil and/or gas
- Well intervention – Operation on a deteriorating oil well
