= Marine architecture =

Branch of architecture focused on coastal, near-shore and off-shore construction

Marine architecture is the design of architectural and engineering structures which support coastal design, near-shore and off-shore or deep-water planning for many projects such as shipyards, ship transport, coastal management or other marine and/or hydroscape activities. These structures include harbors, lighthouses, marinas, oil platforms, offshore drillings, accommodation platforms and offshore wind farms, floating engineering structures and building architectures or civil seascape developments. Floating structures in deep water may use suction caisson for anchoring.

== Photo gallery ==
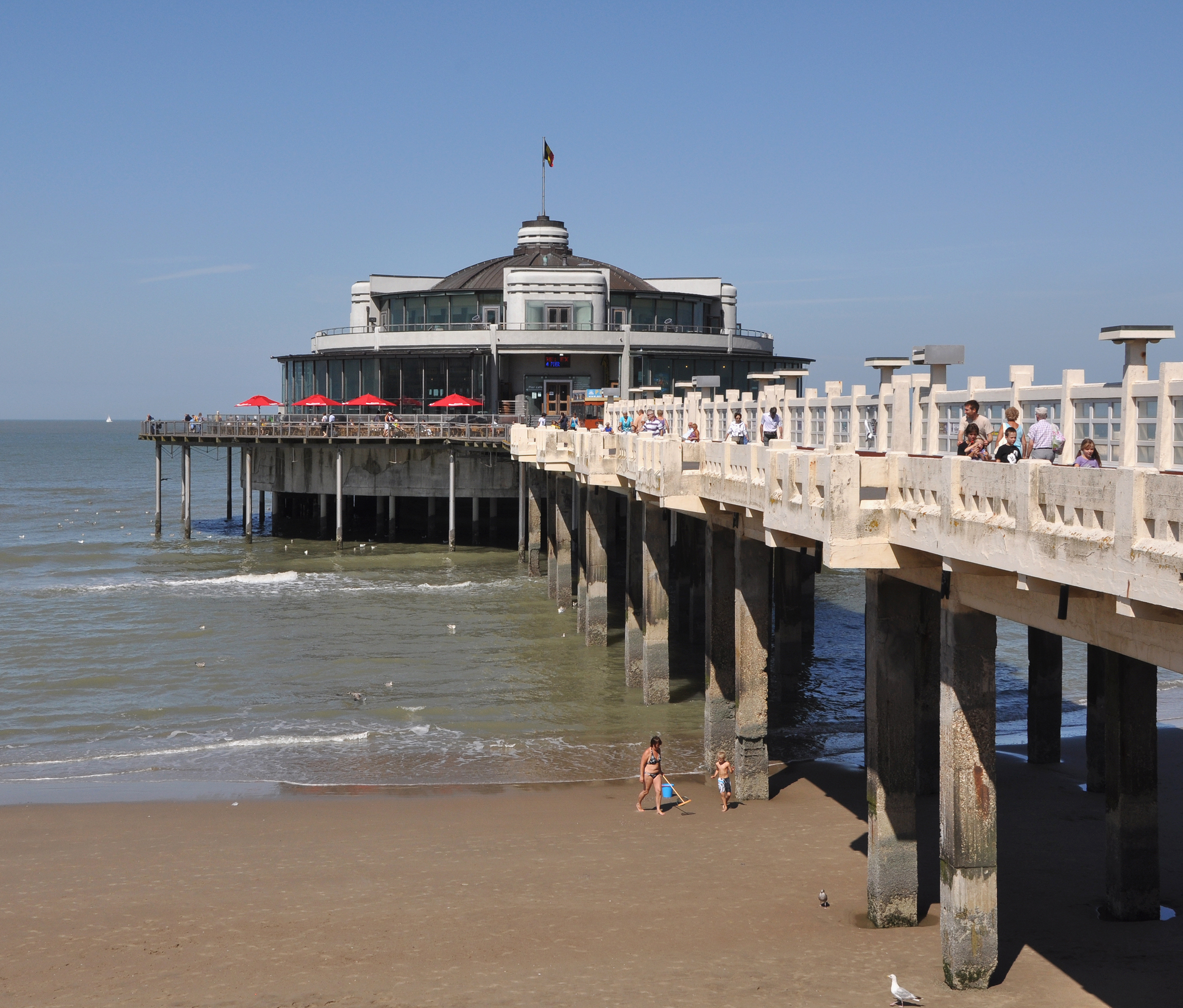
The pier of Blankenberge, Belgium

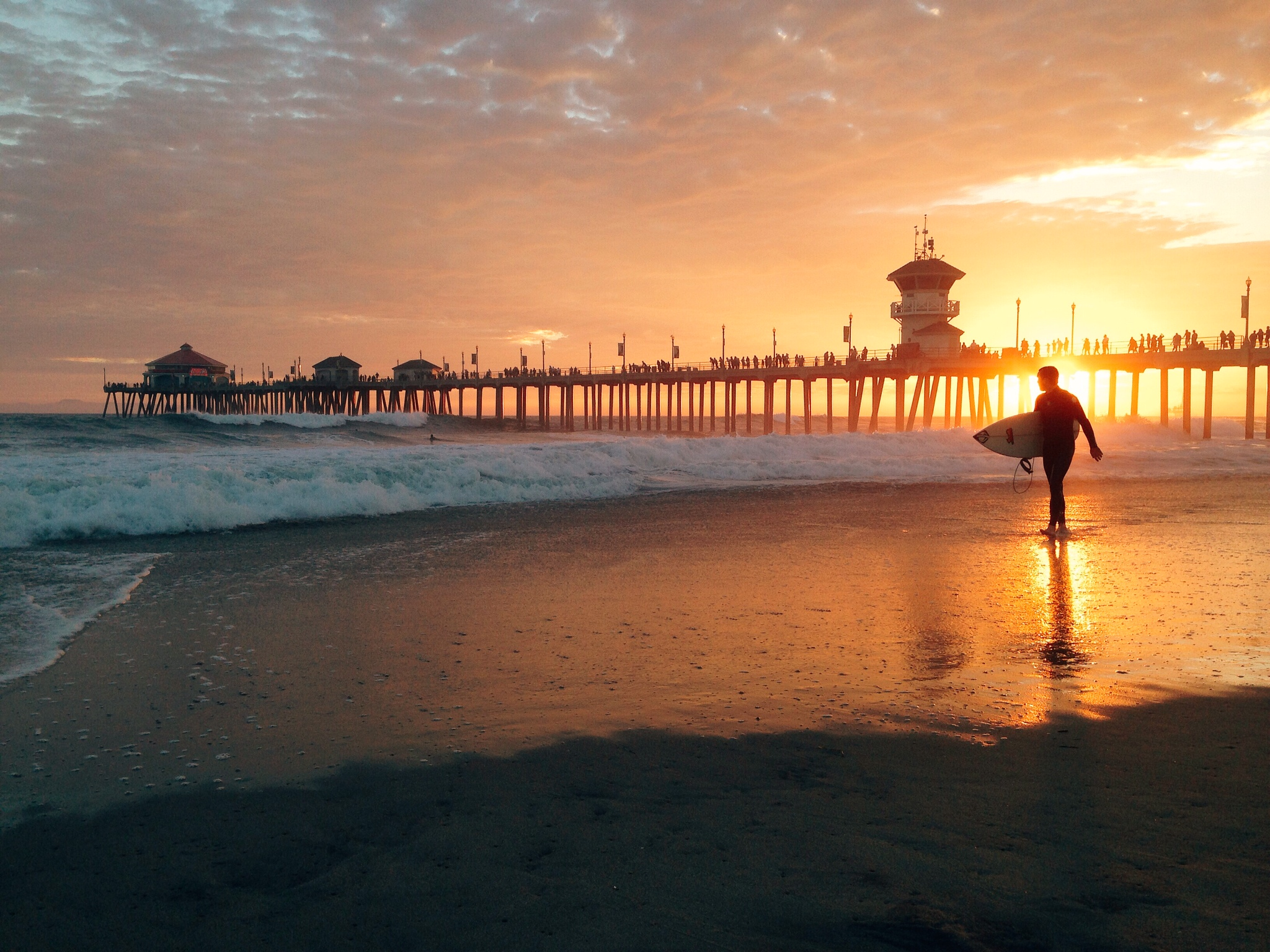
Huntington Beach Pier, California

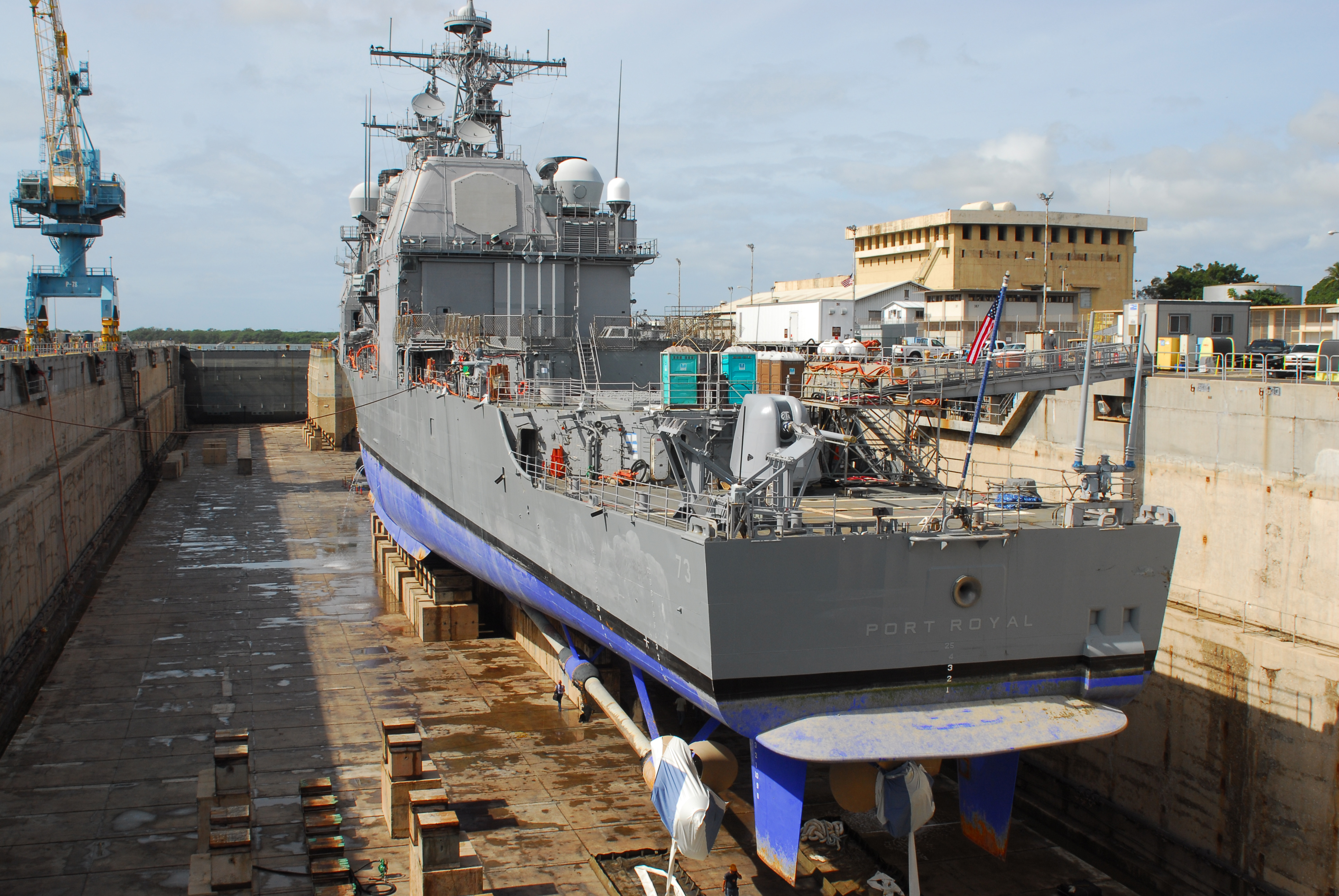
USS Port Royal (CG-73) in drydock

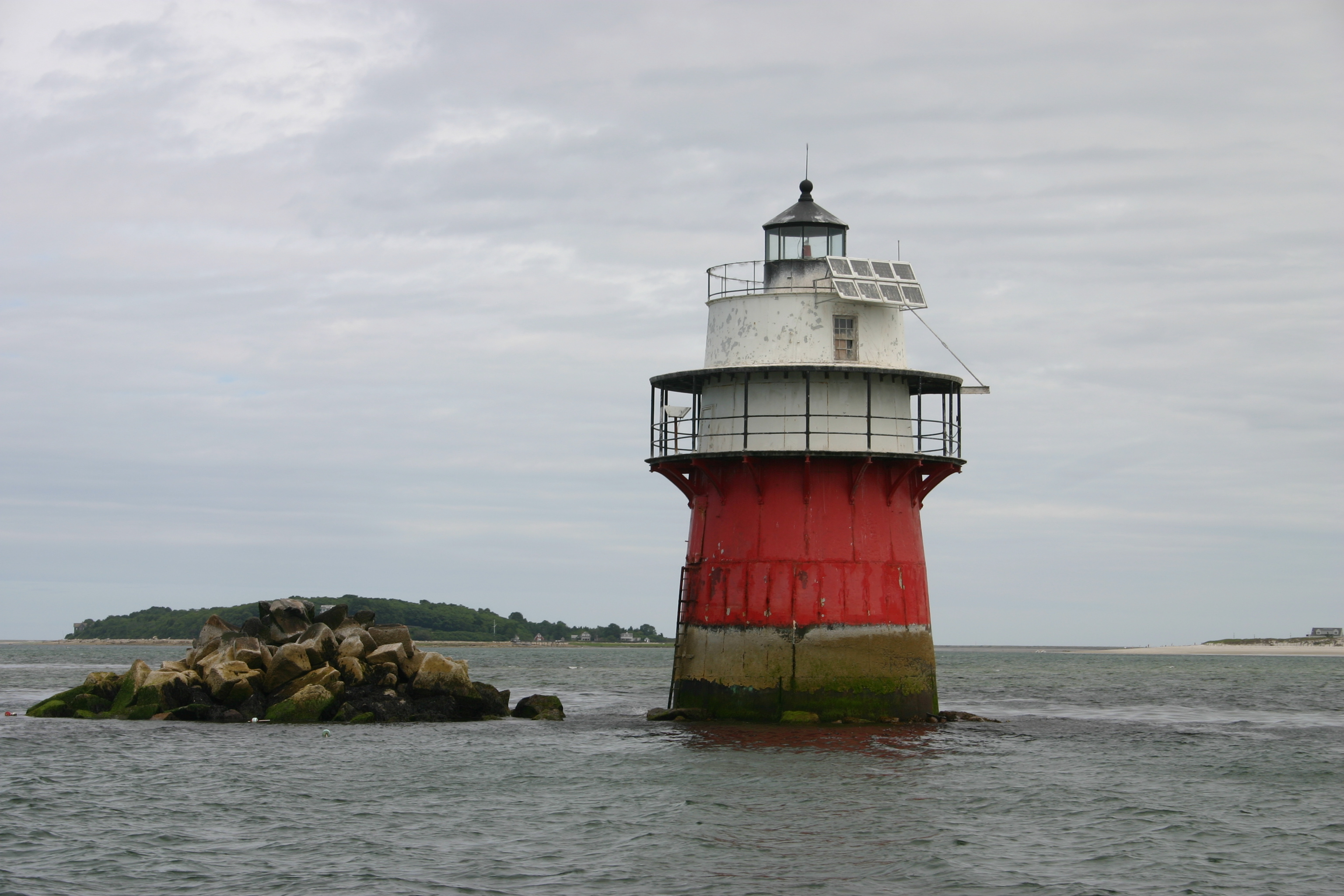
Duxbury Pier Light in Plymouth harbor

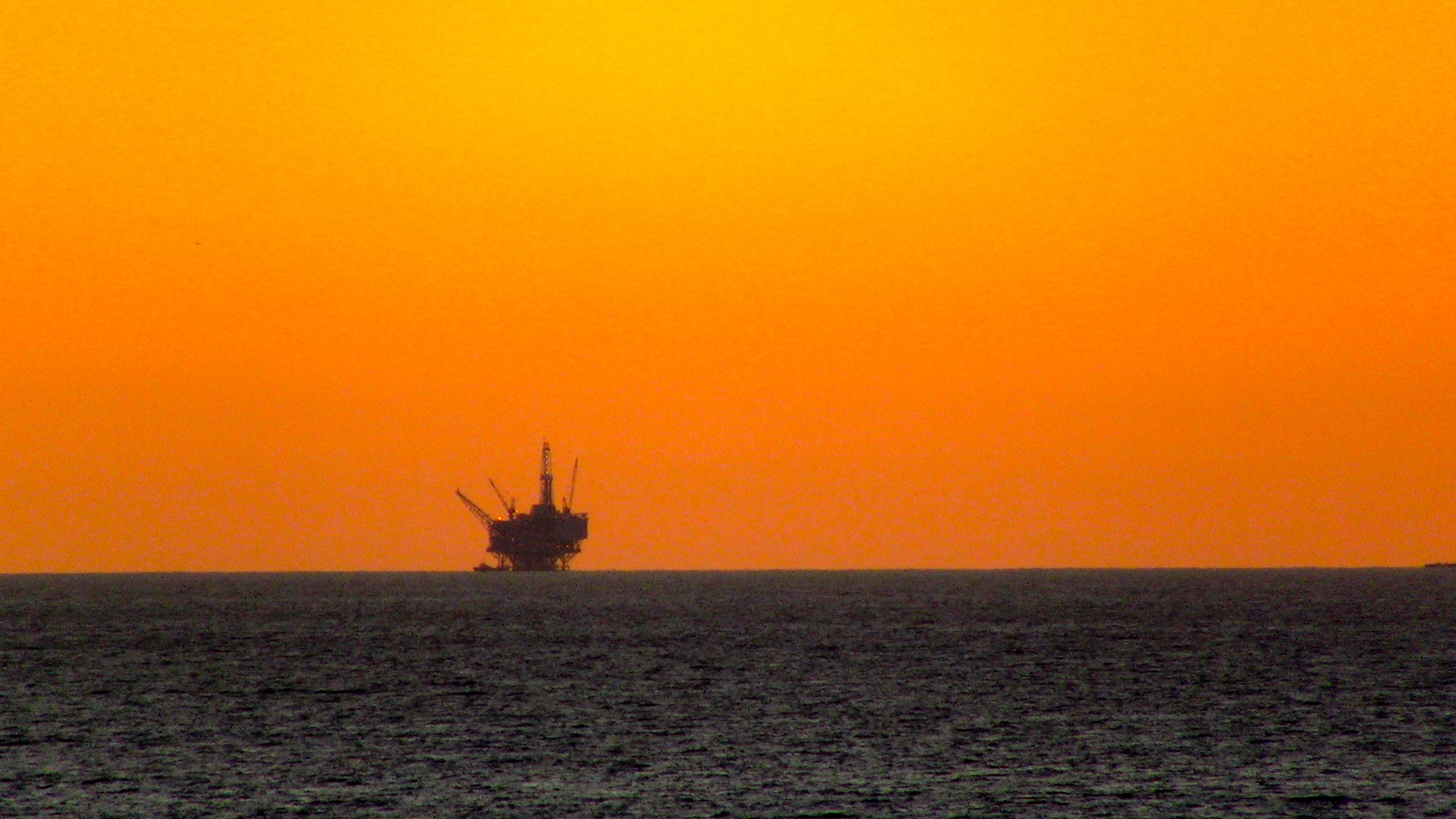
An oil drilling platform off the coast of Santa Barbara, CA

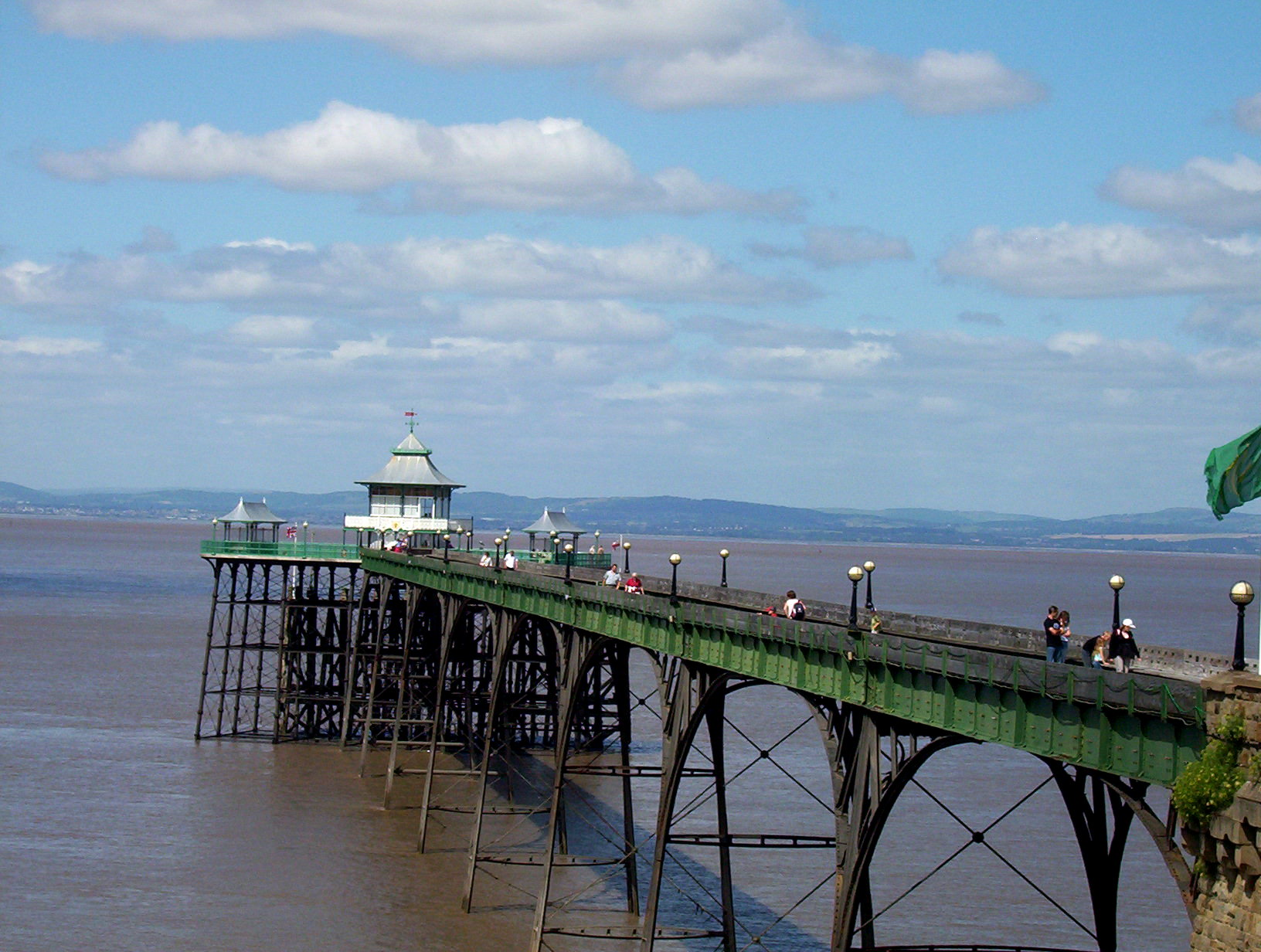
Victorian pier at Clevedon, Somerset, England

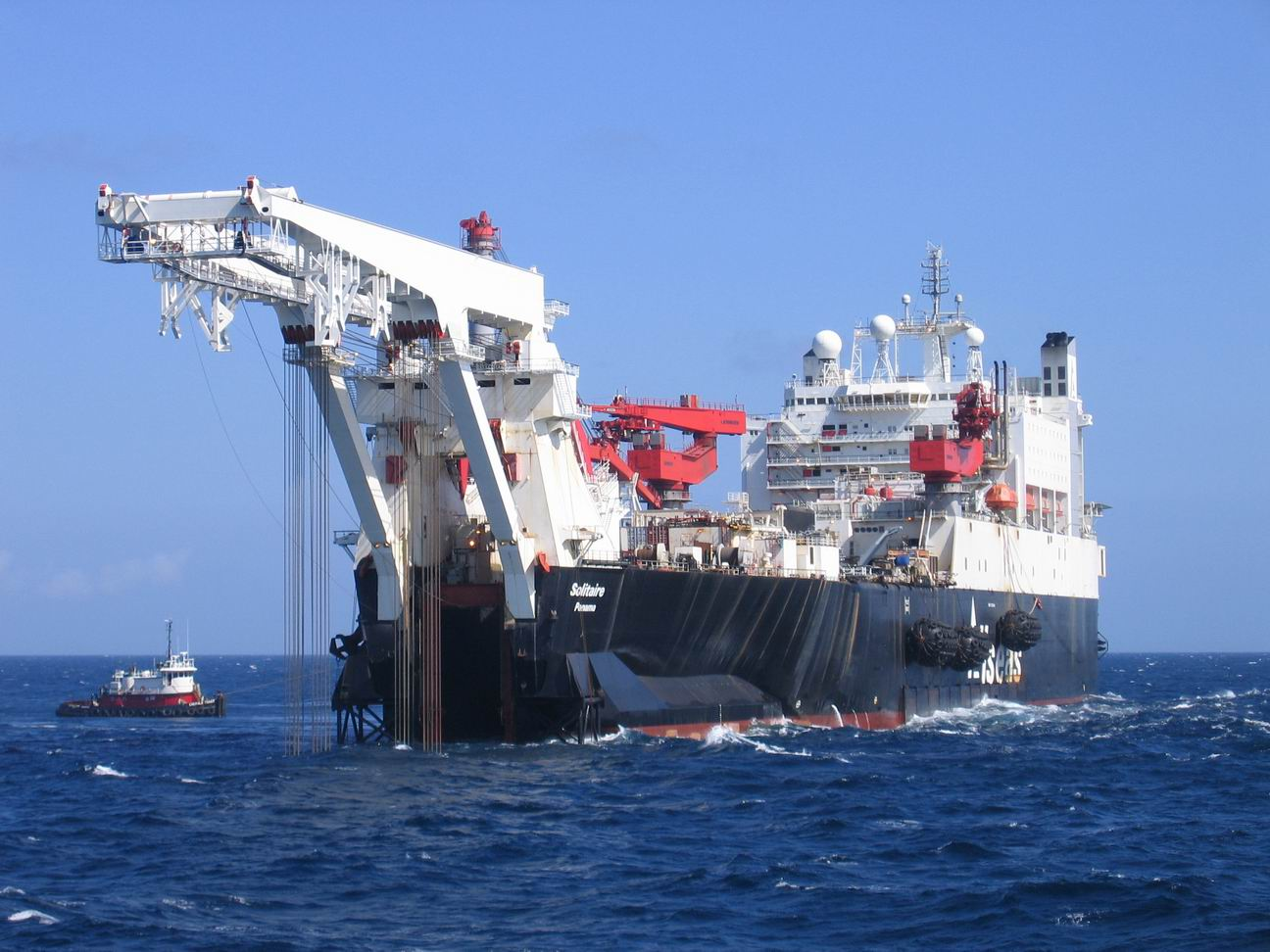
The Solitaire, one of the largest pipe-laying ships in the world

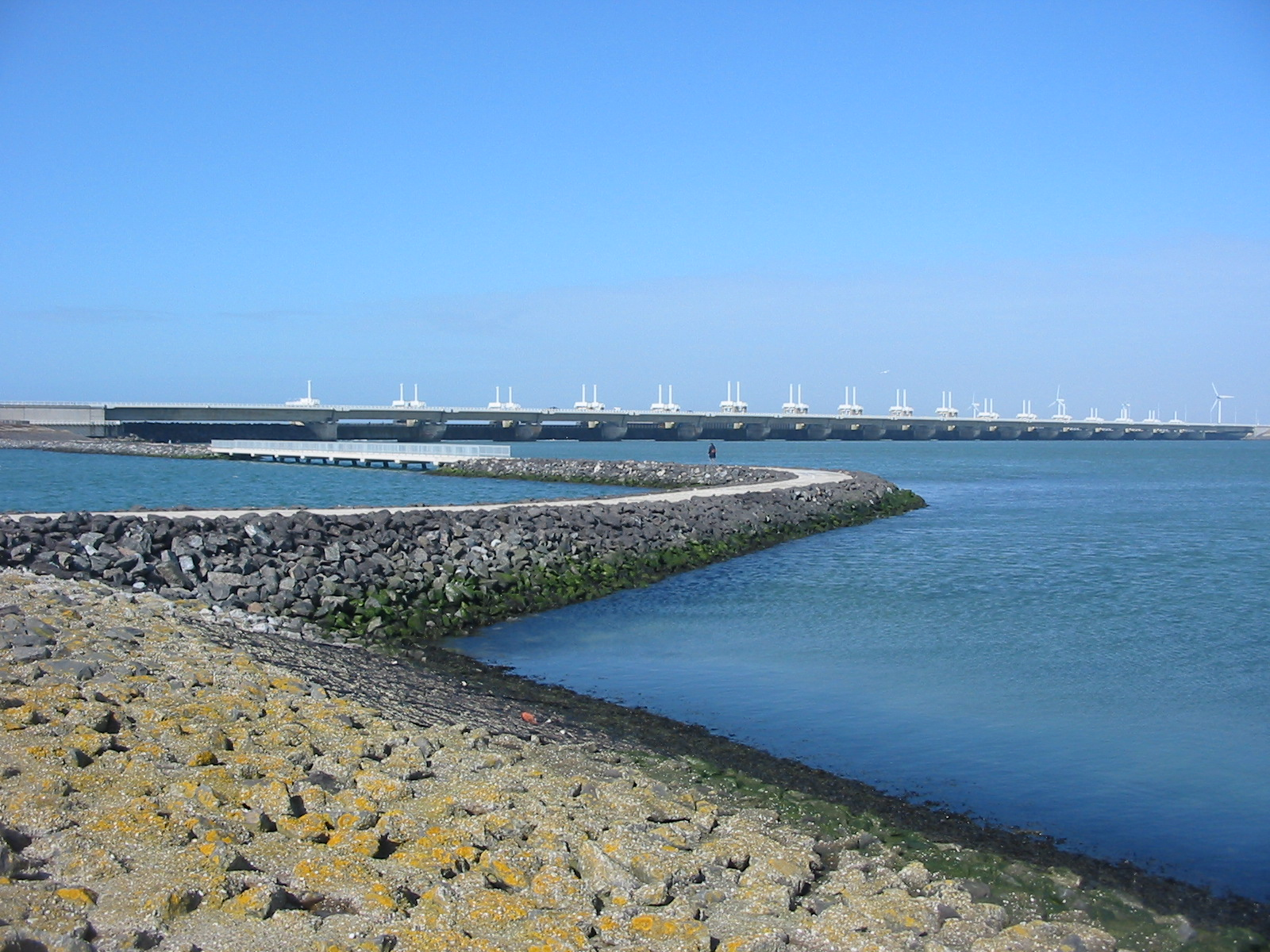
Oosterscheldekering sea wall, the Netherlands.

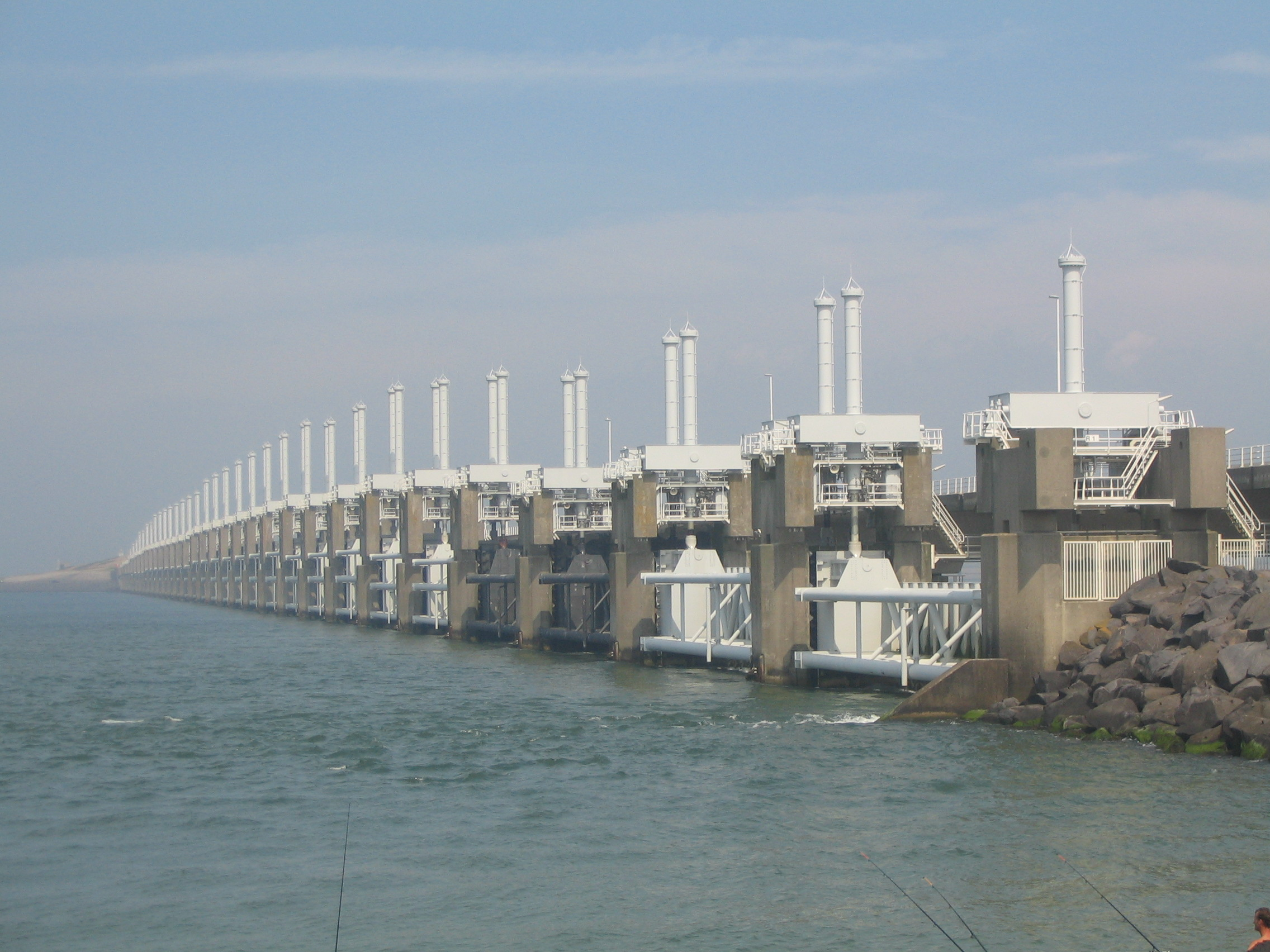
One of the three movable barrier sections of the Oosterscheldekering

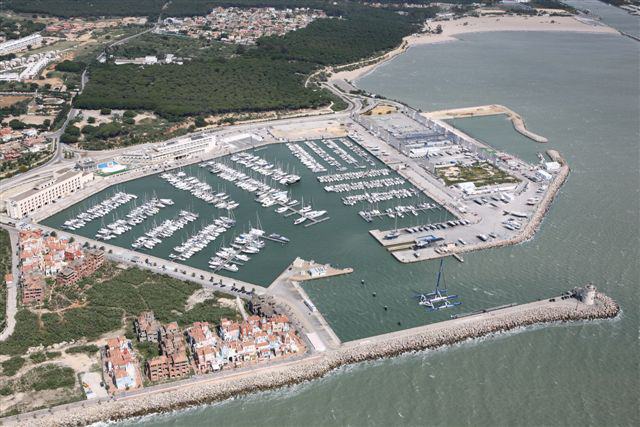
Aerial view of a typical marina (harbor dredge and lighthouse in lower right)

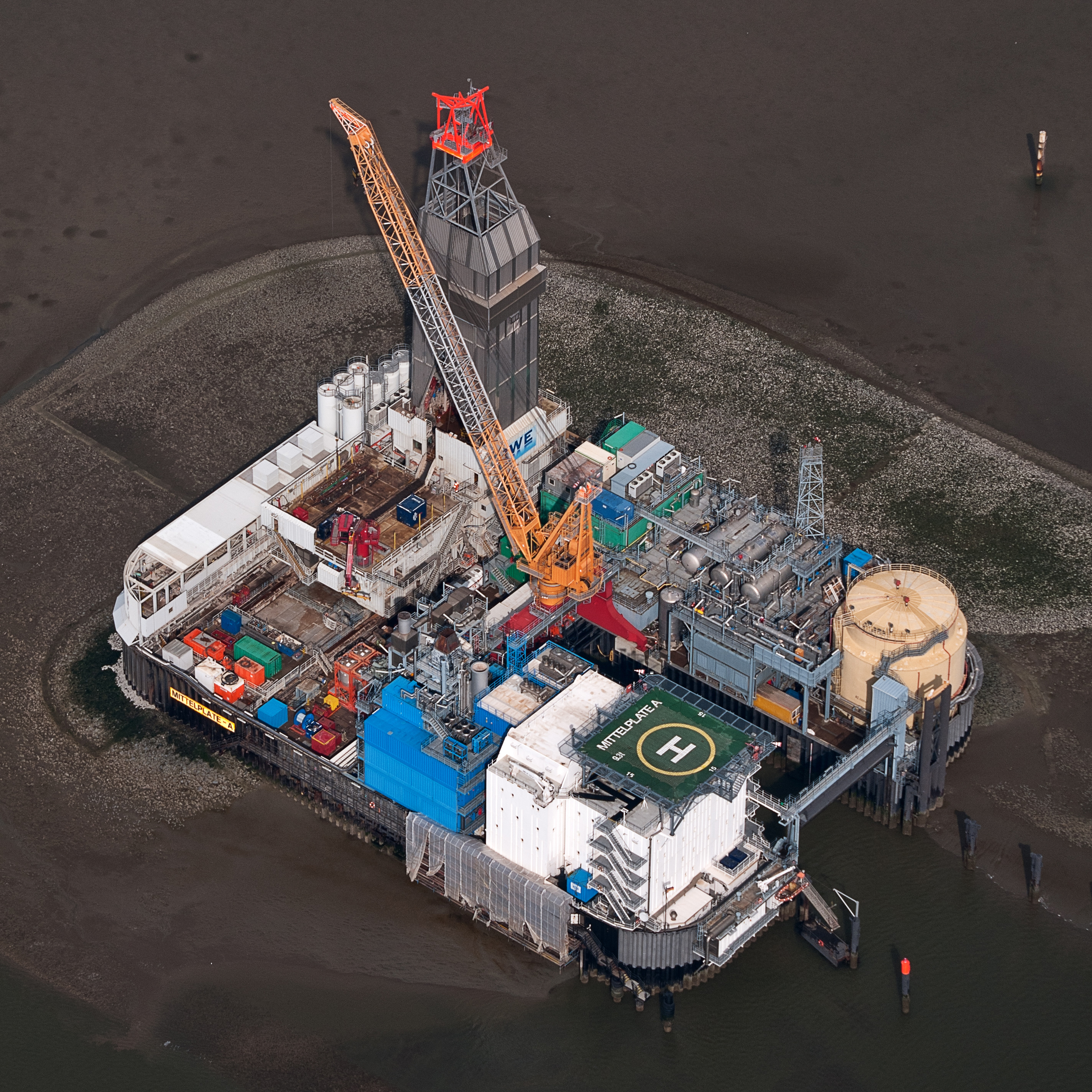
Oil platform Mittelplate includes an accommodation platform

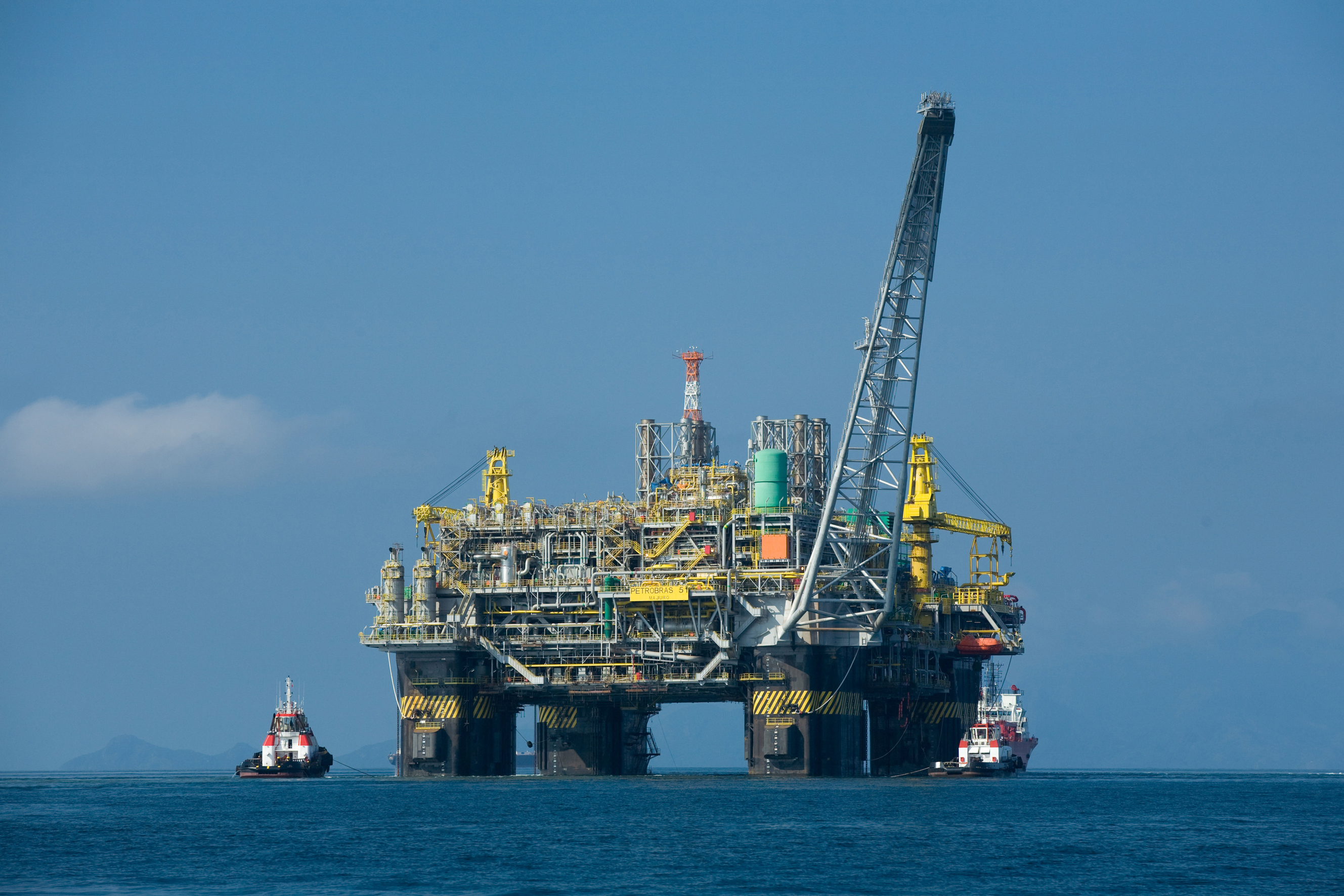
Oil platform P-51 off the Brazilian coast is a semi-submersible platform

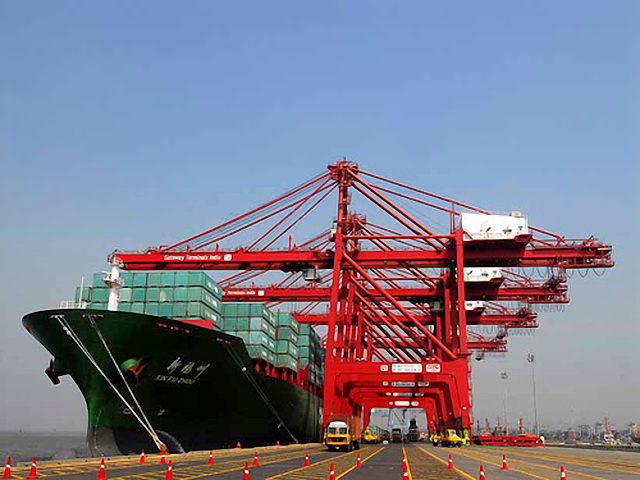
Harbour cranes unload cargo from a container ship at the Jawaharlal Nehru Port in Navi Mumbai, India.

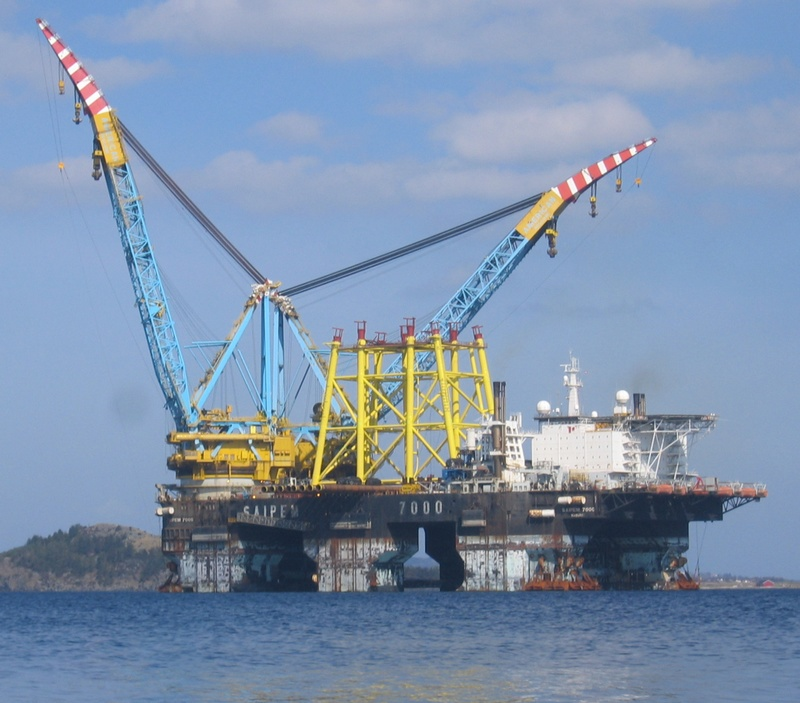
The Saipem 7000, a semi-submersible crane vessel equipped with a J-lay pipe-laying system

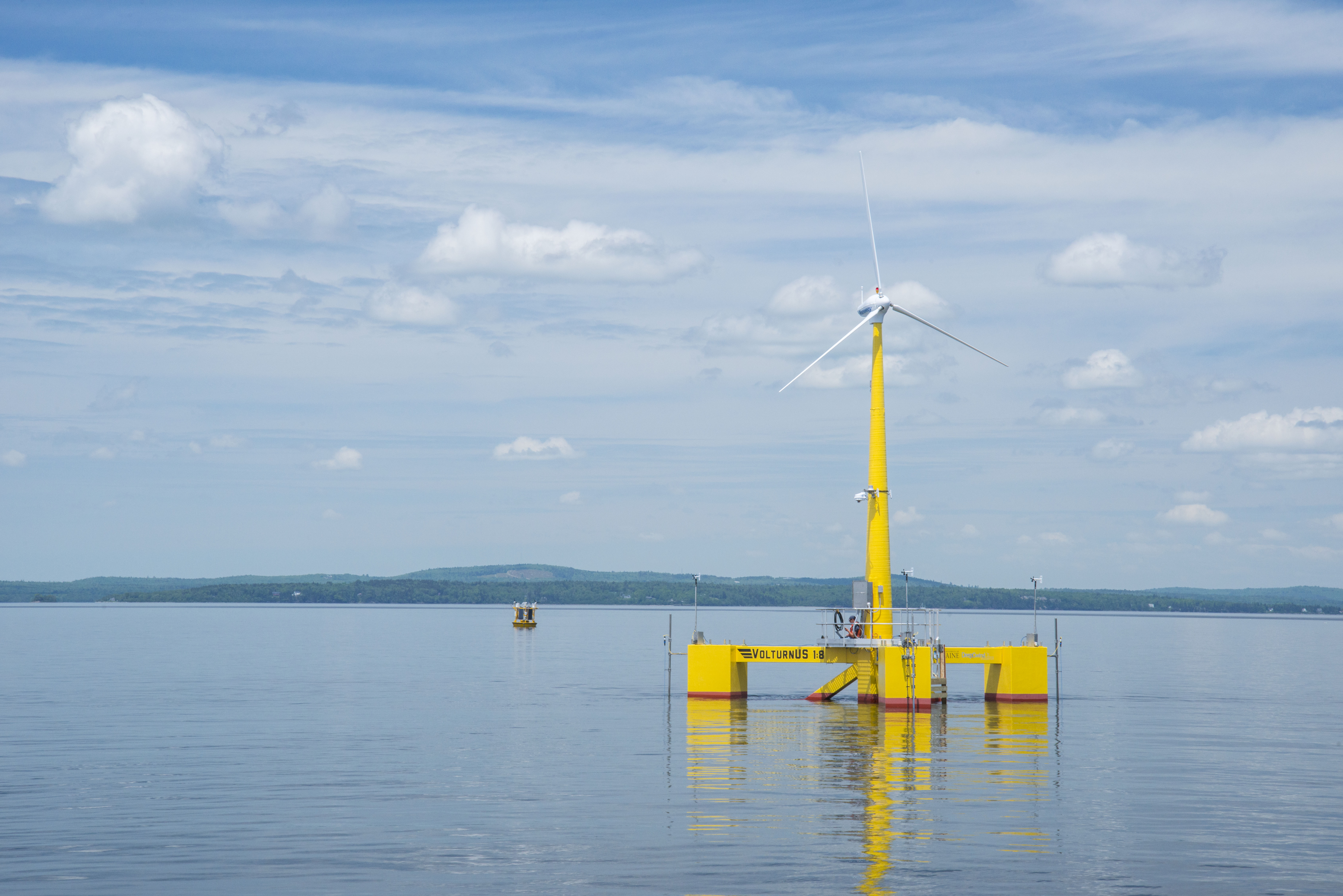
University of Maine's Floating wind turbine VolturnUS 1:8 was the first grid-connected offshore wind turbine in the Americas.

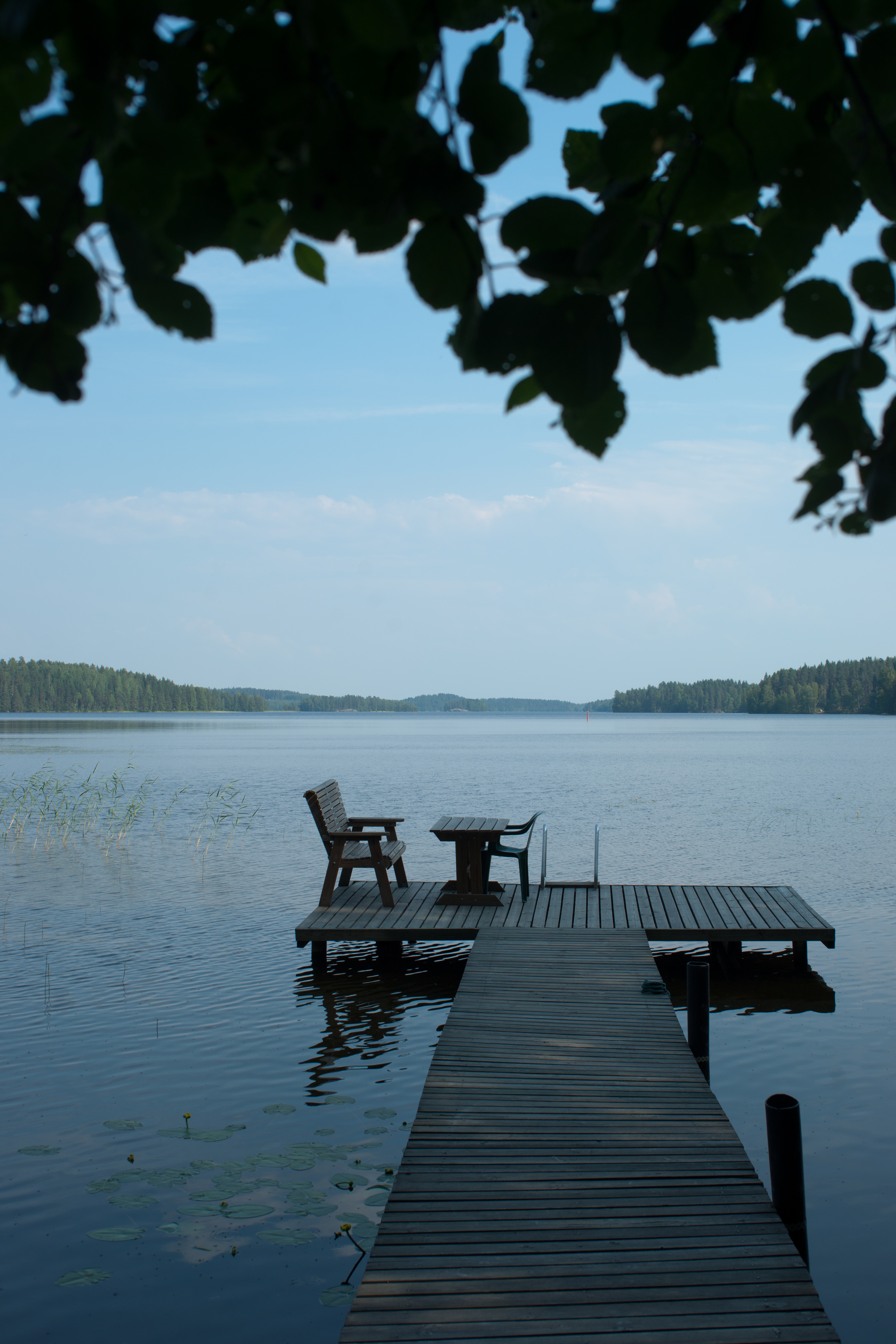
A typical Finnish pier with a table, chair and ladders for swimmers in Joutsa, Central Finland

A single floating cylindrical spar buoy is moored by catenary cables. Hywind uses a ballasted catenary layout that adds 60 tonnes (66 tons) weights hanging from the midpoint of each anchor cable to provide additional tension.

== See also ==
- Aveva – Software company in United Kingdom
- Civil engineering – Engineering discipline focused on physical infrastructure
- Cofferdam – Barrier allowing liquid to be pumped out of an enclosed area
- Earth materials – Naturally occurring materials found on Earth
- FORAN System – CAD/CAM/CAE system
- Floating wind turbine – Type of wind turbine
- Geotechnical engineering – Scientific study of earth materials in engineering problems
- Geotechnical investigation – Study of properties of soil earthworks
- Geotechnics – Scientific study of earth materials in engineering problems
- Marine engineering – Engineering and design of shipboard systems
- Material properties of Roman concrete – Building material used in ancient Rome for marine construction
- Naval architecture – Engineering discipline of marine vessels
- Ocean engineering – Engineering and design of shipboard systems
- Oceanography – Scientific study of the ocean
- Ocean – Body of salt water covering most of Earth
- Offshore (hydrocarbons)
- Offshore construction – Installation of structures and facilities in a marine environment
- Offshore geotechnical engineering – Sub-field of engineering concerned with human-made structures in the sea
- Submarine pipeline – Pipeline that is laid on the seabed or below it inside a trench
- Subsea production system – Wells located on the seabed
- Subsea – Technology of submerged operations in the sea
- Wellhead – Component at the surface of a well
