= Subsea Internet of Things =

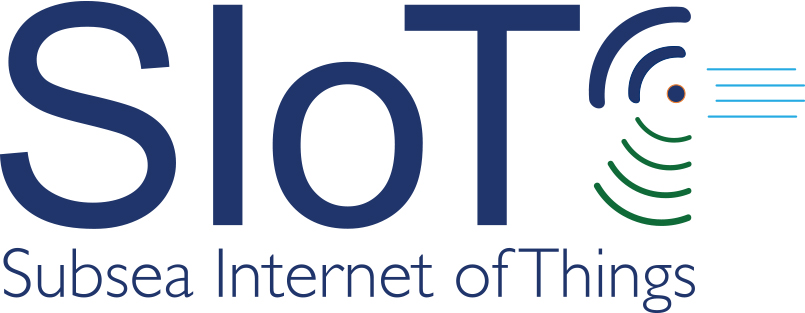
- Industry: Subsea Wireless Local Area Networks (WLAN)
- Compatible hardware: Linear Networks, Sensors, Monitoring
- Website: csignum.com

Subsea Internet of Things (SIoT) is a network of smart, wireless sensors and smart devices configured to provide actionable operational intelligence such as performance, condition and diagnostic information. It is coined from the term The Internet of Things (IoT). Unlike IoT, SIoT focuses on subsea communication through the water and the water-air boundary. SIoT systems are based around smart, wireless devices incorporating Seatooth radio and Seatooth Hybrid technologies. SIoT systems incorporate standard sensors including temperature, pressure, flow, vibration, corrosion and video. Processed information is shared among nearby wireless sensor nodes. SIoT systems are used for environmental monitoring, oil & gas production control and optimisation and subsea asset integrity management. Some features of IoT's share similar characteristics to cloud computing. There is also a recent increase of interest looking at the integration of IoT and cloud computing. Subsea cloud computing is an architecture design to provide an efficient means of SIoT systems to manage large data sets. It is an adaption of cloud computing frameworks to meet the needs of the underwater environment. Similarly to fog computing or edge computing, critical focus remains at the edge. Algorithms are used to interrogate the data set for information which is used to optimise production.

Also known as Underwater-Internet of Things (U-IoT) or Underwater Wireless Sensor Network (UWSN), SIoT can be implemented for marine life monitoring and overfishing problems to support some aspects of Fourth Industrial Revolution.

== History ==
Research into underwater networks began in the 1990s. However, the IoUT has only recently started to develop, driven by advancements in sensor technologies and the increasing need for marine monitoring. The urgency to obtain real-time data for addressing climate change and protecting natural resources has accelerated the development of this technology.

== Main Components ==
The main components of IoUT include:

- Underwater Sensors: Devices designed to collect data on physical parameters such as temperature, salinity, oxygen levels, and pressure. Recent studies have highlighted the importance of predictive models for improving data transmission in real marine environments.
- Autonomous Underwater Vehicles (AUVs): Robots that navigate autonomously in deep-sea environments, collecting data without human intervention.
- Acoustic and Optical Networks: Underwater communication is limited compared to terrestrial communication because radio waves are rapidly attenuated. Consequently, IoUT relies primarily on acoustic communication and, in some cases, optical or underwater cable communications.
- Low Energy Consumption Devices: Technologies developed to harvest energy from the underwater environment, such as fuel cells or methods for converting wave energy into electricity, are used because batteries are difficult to replace or recharge underwater.

== Applications ==
IoUT has diverse applications across various sectors:

- Environmental Monitoring: IoUT enables the monitoring of marine ecosystems, including data collection on coral reef health, biodiversity, and water pollution.
- Oil and Gas Industry: IoUT devices are used to monitor offshore platforms and underwater pipelines to prevent leaks, structural damage, or accidents. Recent models have been developed to predict signal-to-noise ratios (SNR) for reliable communication.
- Fisheries and Aquaculture: Sensors help track fish schools and monitor water quality, improving fisheries management and aquaculture sustainability.
- Underwater Archaeology: IoUT aids in the discovery and protection of submerged historical sites, such as shipwrecks and sunken cities.
- Security and Surveillance: IoUT systems are employed to monitor coastal areas and sensitive underwater infrastructure, including ports and pipelines. Integrating machine learning techniques is crucial for managing interference and ensuring safe operations.

== Challenges and Limitations ==
IoUT faces several technical challenges:

- Limited Communication: The marine environment hampers underwater communication due to rapid attenuation of radio waves, necessitating the use of acoustic or optical methods. Predictive and adaptive techniques in acoustic networks have been explored to improve performance.
- Reliability: Devices must withstand extreme conditions such as high pressure and saltwater corrosion.
- Power Supply: Powering underwater devices is challenging since recharging is difficult. Integrated systems combining acoustic technologies with low-power transmissions, such as LoRa, offer solutions to reduce power consumption and enhance network autonomy.

== Future ==
The future of IoUT appears promising with expected advancements in underwater communication technologies, energy efficiency, and artificial intelligence for network optimization. These developments are likely to lead to greater global adoption. The evolution of intelligent sensor technologies and autonomous vehicles will transform ocean monitoring and management, with significant implications for marine environment protection and sustainable resource exploitation. Enhanced collaboration between academic institutions and industries could enable IoUT to play a central role in monitoring and conserving marine ecosystems.

== Bibliography ==
- Busacca, F., Galluccio, L., Palazzo, S., Panebianco, A., Qi, Z., & Pompili, D. (2024). Adaptive versus predictive techniques in underwater acoustic communication networks. Computer Networks, 252, 110679. https://doi.org/10.1016/j.comnet.2024.110679
- Igbinenikaro, O. P., Adekoya, O. O., & Etukudoh, E. A. (2024). Emerging underwater survey technologies: a review and future outlook. Open Access Research Journal of Science and Technology, 10(02), (pp. 071-084). https://doi.org/10.53022/oarjst.2024.10.2.0052
- Busacca, F., Galluccio, L., Palazzo, S., Panebianco, A., & Scarvaglieri, A. (2024). Balancing Optimization for Underwater Network Cost Effectiveness (BOUNCE): a Multi-Armed Bandit Solution. In 2024 IEEE International Conference on Communications Workshops (ICC Workshops) (pp. 1340-1345). IEEE. https://doi.org/10.1109/ICCWorkshops59551.2024.10615825
- Rout, D. K., Kapoor, M., Subudhi, B. N., Thangaraj, V., Jakhetiya, V., & Bansal, A. (2024). Underwater visual surveillance: A comprehensive survey. Ocean Engineering, 309, 118367. https://doi.org/10.1016/j.oceaneng.2024.118367
- Igbinenikaro, O. P., Adekoya, O. O., & Etukudoh, E. A. (2024). Emerging underwater survey technologies: a review and future outlook. Open Access Research Journal of Science and Technology, 10(02), 071-084. https://doi.org/10.53022/oarjst.2024.10.2.0052
- Busacca, F., Galluccio, L., Palazzo, S., Panebianco, A., & Raftopoulos, R. (2024). Adaptive Modulation in Underwater Acoustic Networks (AMUSE): A Multi-Armed Bandit Approach. In ICC 2024-IEEE International Conference on Communications (pp. 2336-2341). IEEE. https://doi.org/10.1109/10.1109/ICC51166.2024.10623120
- Zhu, R., Boukerche, A., Long, L., & Yang, Q. (2024). Design Guidelines on Trust Management for Underwater Wireless Sensor Networks. IEEE Communications Surveys & Tutorials. https://doi.org/10.1109/COMST.2024.3389728
- Zhao, X., Qi, Z., & Pompili, D. (2024). Link adaptation in Underwater Wireless Optical Communications based on deep learning. Computer Networks, 242, 110233. https://doi.org/10.1016/j.comnet.2024.110233
- Busacca, F., Galluccio, L., Palazzo, S., & Panebianco, A. (2024). A comparative analysis of predictive channel models for real shallow water environments. Computer Networks, 110557. https://doi.org/10.1016/j.comnet.2024.110557
- Hsieh, Y. T., Qi, Z., & Pompili, D. (2023). Full-duplex underwater acoustic communications via self-interference cancellation in space. Journal of Communications and Networks, 25(2), (pp. 167-181). https://doi.org/10.23919/JCN.2022.000052
- Dong, E., Cao, P., Zhang, J., Zhang, S., Fang, N. X., & Zhang, Y. (2023). Underwater acoustic metamaterials. National Science Review, 10(6), nwac246. https://doi.org/10.1093/nsr/nwac246
- Mertens, J. S., Panebianco, A., Surudhi, A., Prabagarane, N., & Galluccio, L. (2023). Network intelligence vs. jamming in underwater networks: how learning can cope with misbehavior. Frontiers in Communications and Networks, 4, 1179626. https://doi.org/10.3389/frcmn.2023.1179626
- Campagnaro, F., Steinmetz, F., & Renner, B. C. (2023). Survey on low-cost underwater sensor networks: From niche applications to everyday use. Journal of marine science and engineering, 11(1), 125. https://doi.org/10.3390/jmse11010125
- Brincat, A. A., Busacca, F., Galluccio, L., Mertens, J. S., Musumeci, A., Palazzo, S., & Panebianco, A. (2022). An integrated acoustic/LoRa system for transmission of multimedia sensor data over an Internet of Underwater Things. Computer Communications, 192, (pp. 132-142). https://doi.org/10.1016/j.comcom.2022.05.032
- Petroccia, R., Pelekanakis, K., Alves, J., Fioravanti, S., Blouin, S., & Pecknold, S. (2018). An adaptive cross-layer routing protocol for underwater acoustic networks. In 2018 fourth underwater communications and networking conference (UComms) (pp. 1-5). IEEE. https://doi.org/10.1109/UComms.2018.8493225
- Heidemann, J., Stojanovic, M., & Zorzi, M. (2012). Underwater sensor networks: applications, advances and challenges. Philosophical Transactions of the Royal Society A: Mathematical, Physical and Engineering Sciences, 370(1958), (pp. 158-175). https://doi.org/10.1098/rsta.2011.0214
- Radosevic, A., Duman, T. M., Proakis, J. G., & Stojanovic, M. (2011). Channel prediction for adaptive modulation in underwater acoustic communications. In OCEANS 2011 IEEE-Spain (pp. 1-5). IEEE. https://doi.org/10.1109/Oceans-Spain.2011.6003438
- Tomasi, B., Toni, L., Casari, P., Rossi, L., & Zorzi, M. (2010). Performance study of variable-rate modulation for underwater communications based on experimental data. In OCEANS 2010 MTS/IEEE SEATTLE (pp. 1-8). IEEE. https://doi.org/10.1109/OCEANS.2010.5664467
- Domingo, M. C. (2008). Overview of channel models for underwater wireless communication networks. Physical Communication, 1(3), 163-182. https://doi.org/10.1016/j.phycom.2008.09.001
- Pompili, D., & Melodia, T. (2005). Three-dimensional routing in underwater acoustic sensor networks. In Proceedings of the 2nd ACM international workshop on Performance evaluation of wireless ad hoc, sensor, and ubiquitous networks (pp. 214-221). https://doi.org/10.1145/1089803.108998
- Akyildiz, I. F., Pompili, D., & Melodia, T. (2005). Underwater acoustic sensor networks: research challenges. Ad hoc networks, 3(3), (pp. 257-279). https://doi.org/10.1016/j.adhoc.2005.01.004
- Akyildiz, I. F., Pompili, D., & Melodia, T. (2004). Challenges for efficient communication in underwater acoustic sensor networks. ACM Sigbed Review, 1(2), (pp. 3-8). https://doi.org/10.1145/1121776.1121779
- Vuran, M. C., Akan, Ö. B., & Akyildiz, I. F. (2004). Spatio-temporal correlation: theory and applications for wireless sensor networks. Computer Networks, 45(3), (pp. 245-259). https://doi.org/10.1016/j.comnet.2004.03.007
