= Belait CSS-2 =

Second ship of Belait-class Accommodation ships

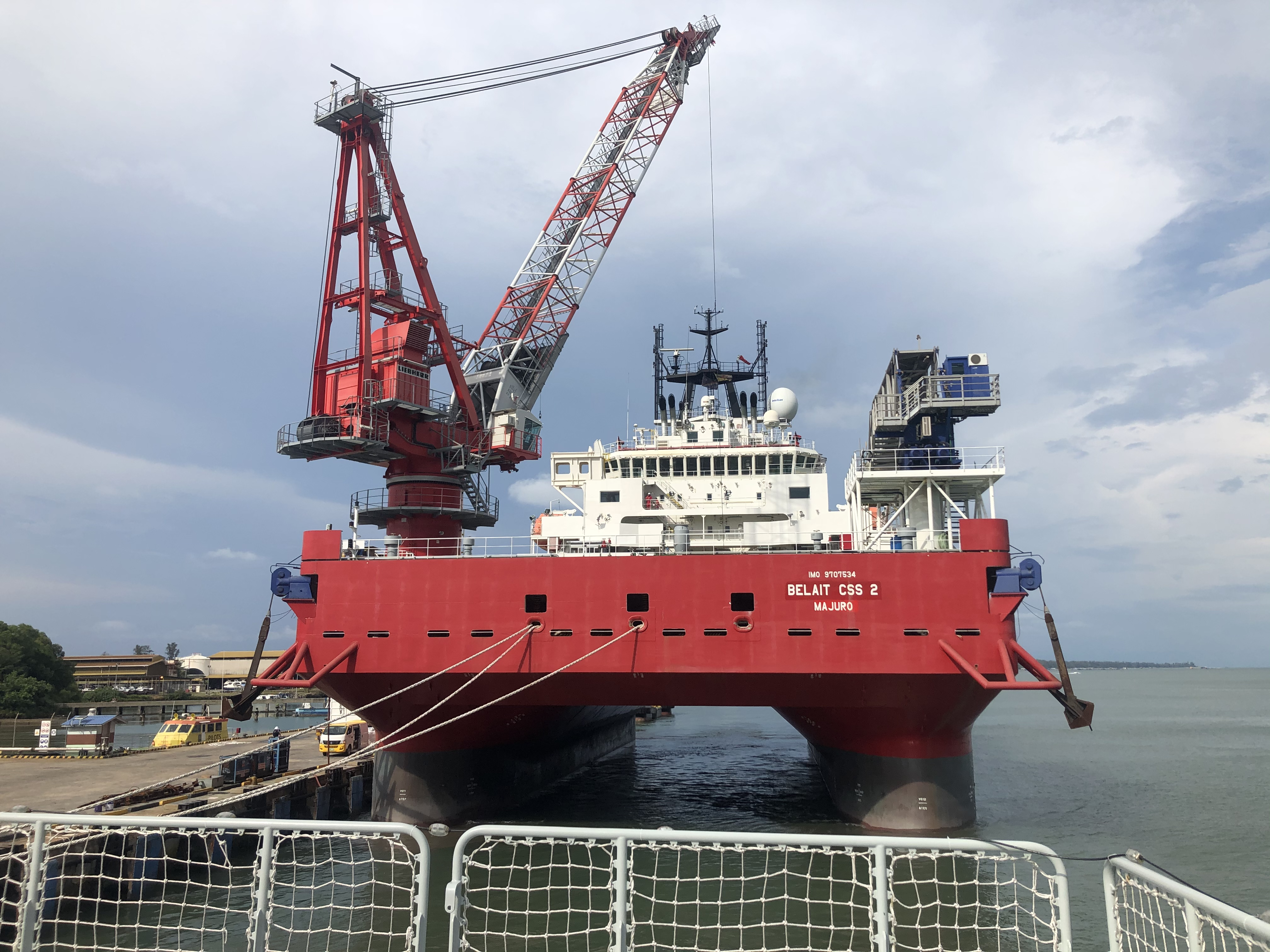
- Belait CSS-2 sitting behind PLANS Qi Ji Guang on 29 September 2019.

History

Marshall Islands
- Name: Belait CSS-2
- Owner: Shell Petroleum Company
- Port of registry: Majuro, Marshall island
- Builder: Mawei Shipbuilding Co., China
- Cost: 526 million yuan ($80 million)
- Acquired: 2 September 2019
- Commissioned: 2 September 2019
- Identification: MMSI number: 538008461; Callsign: V7A2382; IMO: 9707534
- Status: Active

General characteristics
- Type: Accommodation /Well stimulation platform
- Displacement: 3,800 tons
- Length: 84 m (275 ft 7 in)
- Draught: 10.5 m (34 ft 5 in)
- Depth: 20.5 m (67 ft 3 in)
- Propulsion: 6 × 2,800 kW generators
- Speed: 9.1 knots (16.9 km/h; 10.5 mph) maximum
- Boats & landing craft carried: 4 × lifeboats
- Complement: 200 crew
- Aviation facilities: Helicopter landing platform

Belait CSS-2 is an accommodation platform operated by Belait Shipping Company co. Sdn Bhd. in service for Brunei Shell Petroleum. She can provide a place for accommodation, lifting, maintenance, rescue and hoist. She has a sister ship named Belait CSS-1 which is commissioned years longer than Belait CSS-2 which makes Belait CSS-2 the newest one.

== Construction and career ==
Construction of Belait CSS-2 was cooperated between Belait Shipping and Qess and China for construction of oil and gas vessels. Belait CSS-2 was primarily built as a well-intervention vessel to support production of oil in Brunei. Each ship cost about 526 million yuan ($80 million). She was built in Fujian, China and registered in Majuro, Marshall Islands.

Belait CSS-2 was delivered to Brunei on 2 September 2019. She regularly travel to Champion Field which is a complex oil and gas field, situated 40 kilometres (25 mi)s north-northwest of Bandar Seri Begawan, in water depths of 10 to 45 metres (33 to 148 ft). She usually docked in Muara Port, Brunei after every voyages back.

== Equipment ==
The purpose of the CSS is a multi-function well-intervention, supply and light construction vessel. The primary features a 150 t lattice boom crane, a telescopic heave compensated gangway, a moonpool, a 12.8 t rated helideck, DP-2 rating and accommodation up to 200 people.

She is designed by Vard Marine. The design of the CSS is a cost-effective, stable platform with most of the capabilities of much larger vessels at a far lower cost. In addition, they wanted a design that could be built at shipyards around the world.

== Gallery ==
Belait CSS-2 Gallery

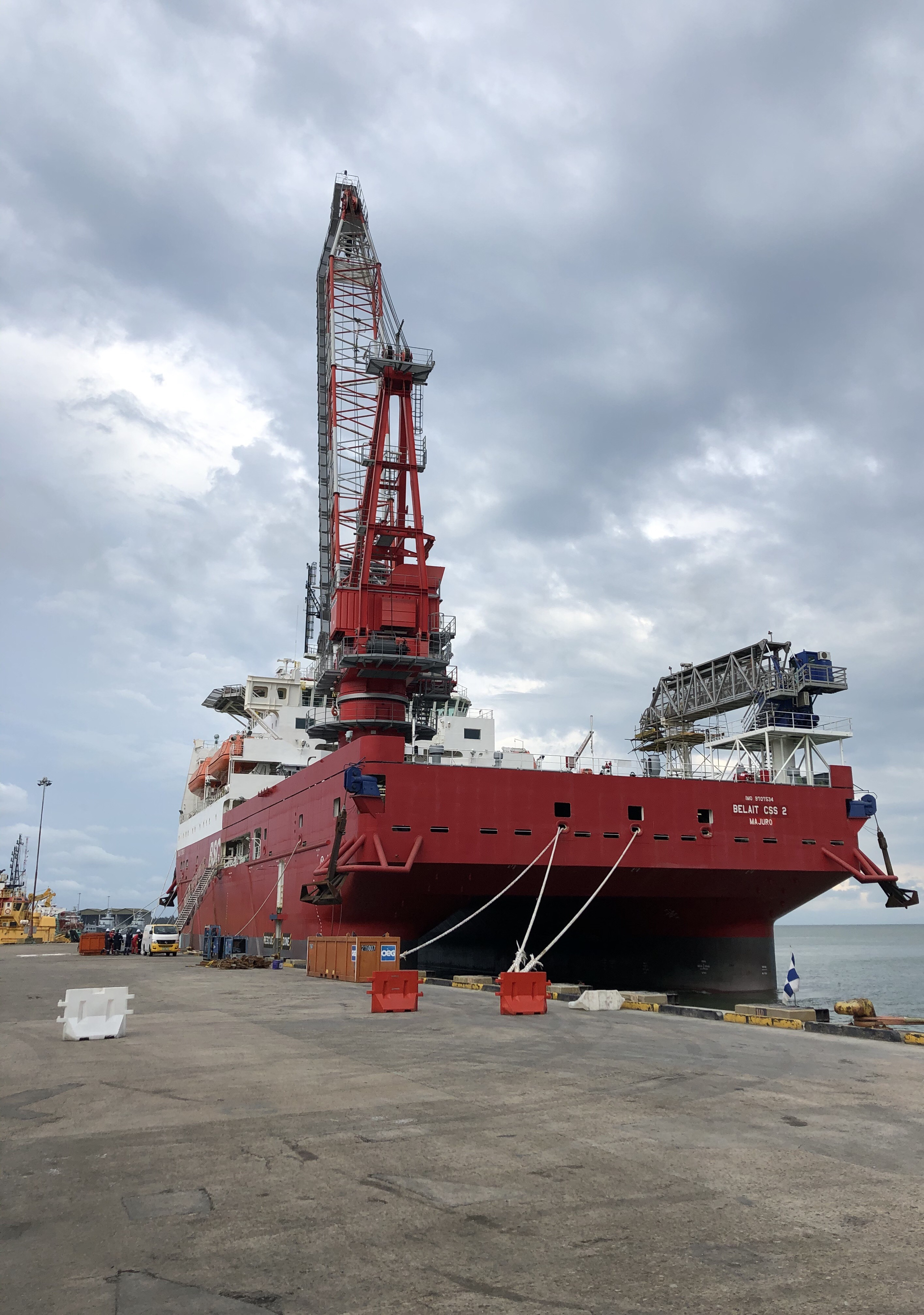
Belait CSS-2 sitting behind PLANS Qi Ji Guang on 29 September 2019 during her first visit to Brunei.

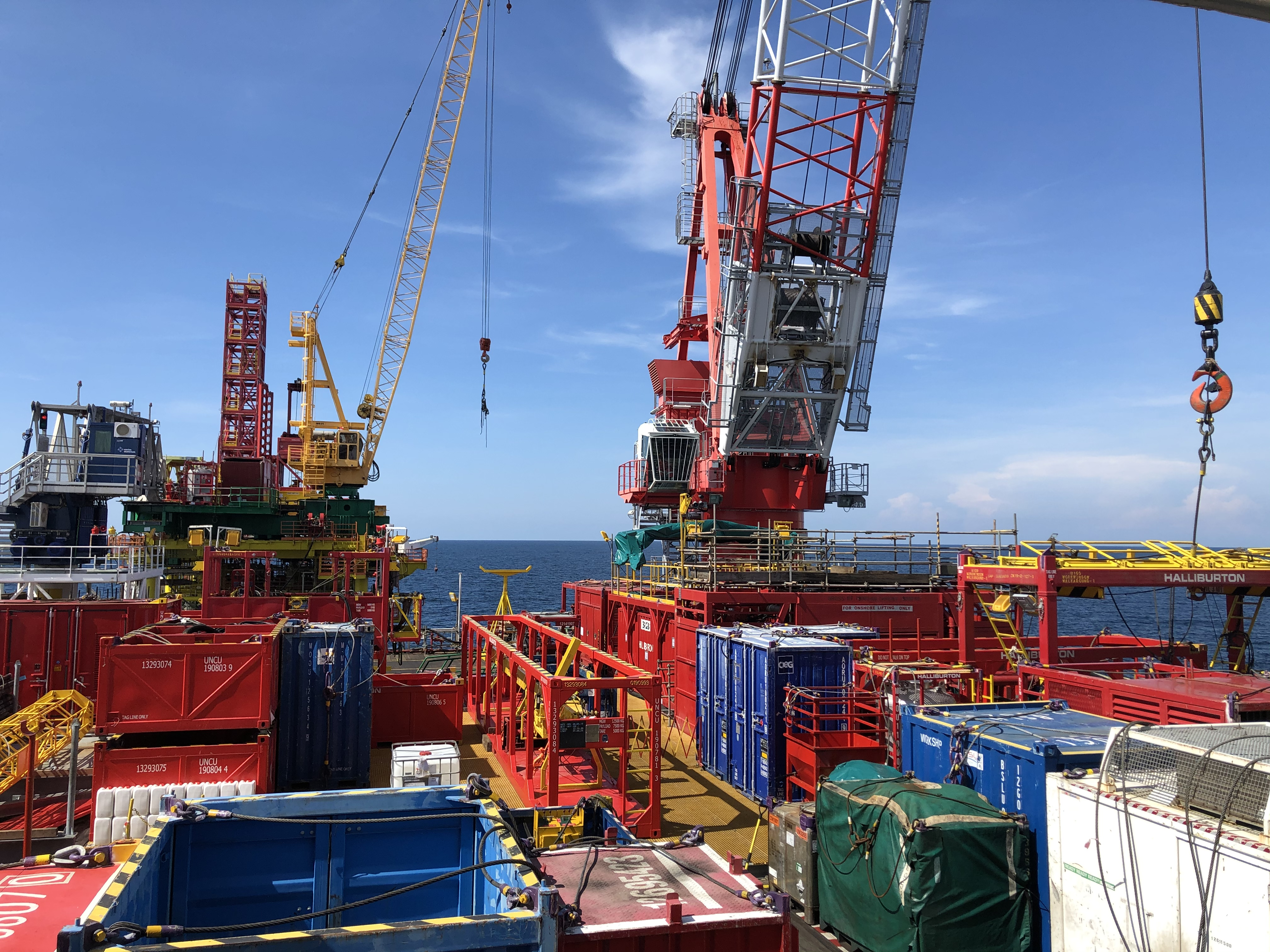
Belait CSS-2 cargo bay on 11 May 2020.
