= Belait CSS-1 =

Lead ship of Belait-class Accommodation ships

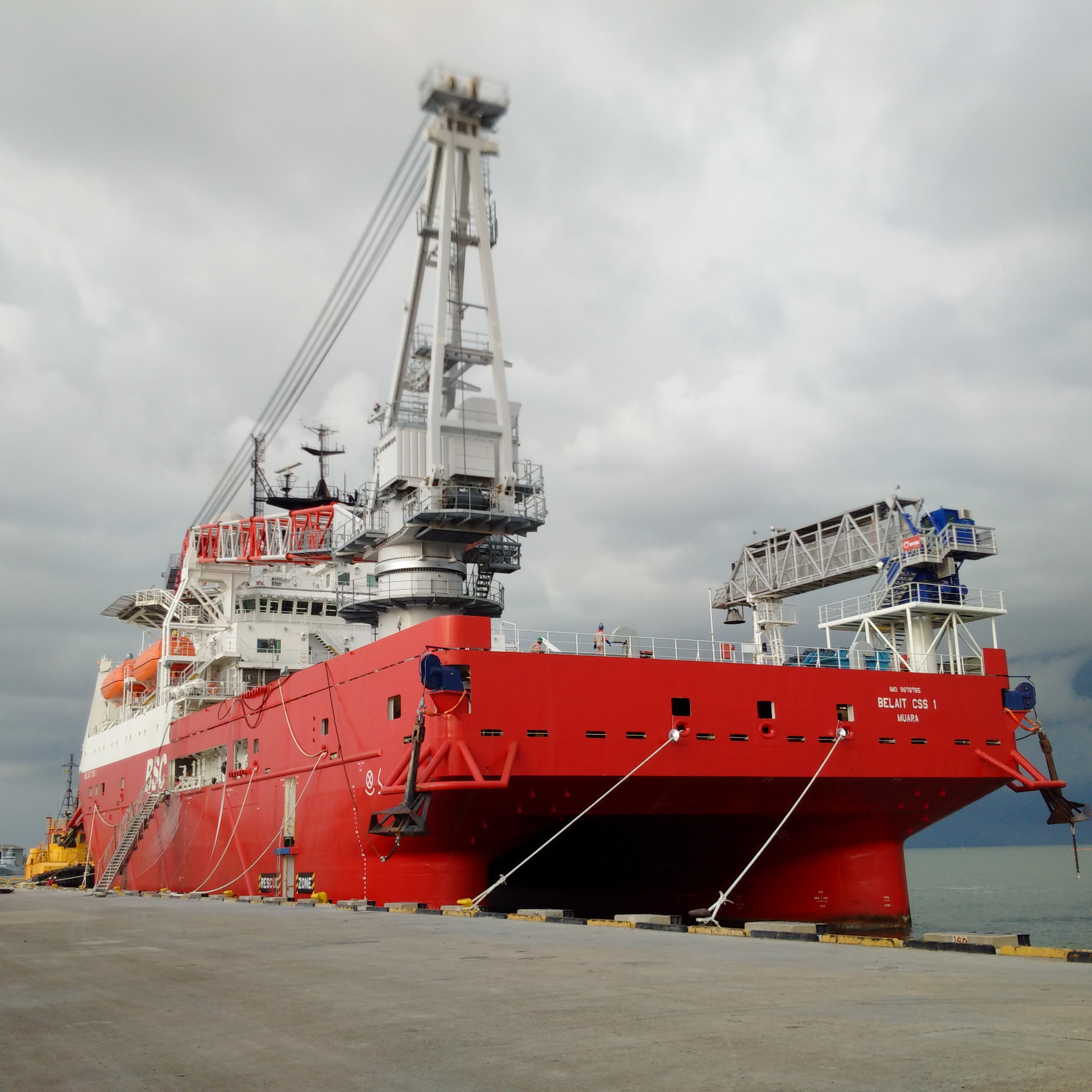
- Belait CSS-1 docked in Muara Port on 22 May 2015.

History

Brunei
- Name: Belait CSS-1
- Owner: Belait Shipping
- Port of registry: Muara, Brunei
- Builder: Mawei Shipbuilding Co., China
- Cost: 526 million yuan ($80 million)
- Acquired: 25 February 2015
- Commissioned: 25 February 2015
- Identification: MMSI number: 508111180; Callsign: V8V3145; IMO: 9676785
- Status: Active

General characteristics
- Type: Accommodation platform
- Displacement: 3,800 tons
- Length: 84 m (275 ft 7 in)
- Draught: 10.5 m (34 ft 5 in)
- Depth: 20.5 m (67 ft 3 in)
- Propulsion: 6 × 2,800 kW generators
- Speed: 9.1 knots (16.9 km/h; 10.5 mph) maximum
- Boats & landing craft carried: 4 × lifeboats
- Aviation facilities: Helicopter landing platform

Belait CSS-1 is a well intervention vessel and accommodation platform owned by Belait Shipping. She can provide places for accommodations, and perform maintenance, rescue, and hoist activities. She has a sister ship named Belait CSS-2, commissioned four years after CSS-1.

== Construction and career ==
Construction of Belait CSS-1 was commissioned by Belait CSS Sendirian Berhad, an SPV Company registered in Brunei Darussalam. Belait CSS-1 was primarily built as a well-intervention vessel to support production of oil in Brunei. She cost about 526 million yuan ($80 million), was built in Fujian, China and registered in Muara, Brunei.

Belait CSS-1 was undocked from the shipyard on 7 December 2013 and delivered to Brunei on 25 February 2015. She regularly travels to the Champion Field, which is a complex oil and gas field, situated 40 kilometres (25 mi) north-northwest of Bandar Seri Begawan, in water depths of 10 to 45 metres. She usually docks in Muara Port, Brunei after every return voyages.

== Equipment ==
The CSS is a multi-function well-intervention, supply, and light construction vessel, with accommodation for workers. It is equipped with a 150 t lattice boom crane, a telescopic heave compensated gangway, a moonpool, a 12.8 t rated helideck, DP-2 rating, and accommodation up to 200 people.

She was designed by Vard Marine. The CSS is a cost-effective, stable platform with most of the capabilities of much larger vessels at a far lower cost. In addition, the design can be built at shipyards around the world.

== Gallery ==
Belait CSS-1 Gallery

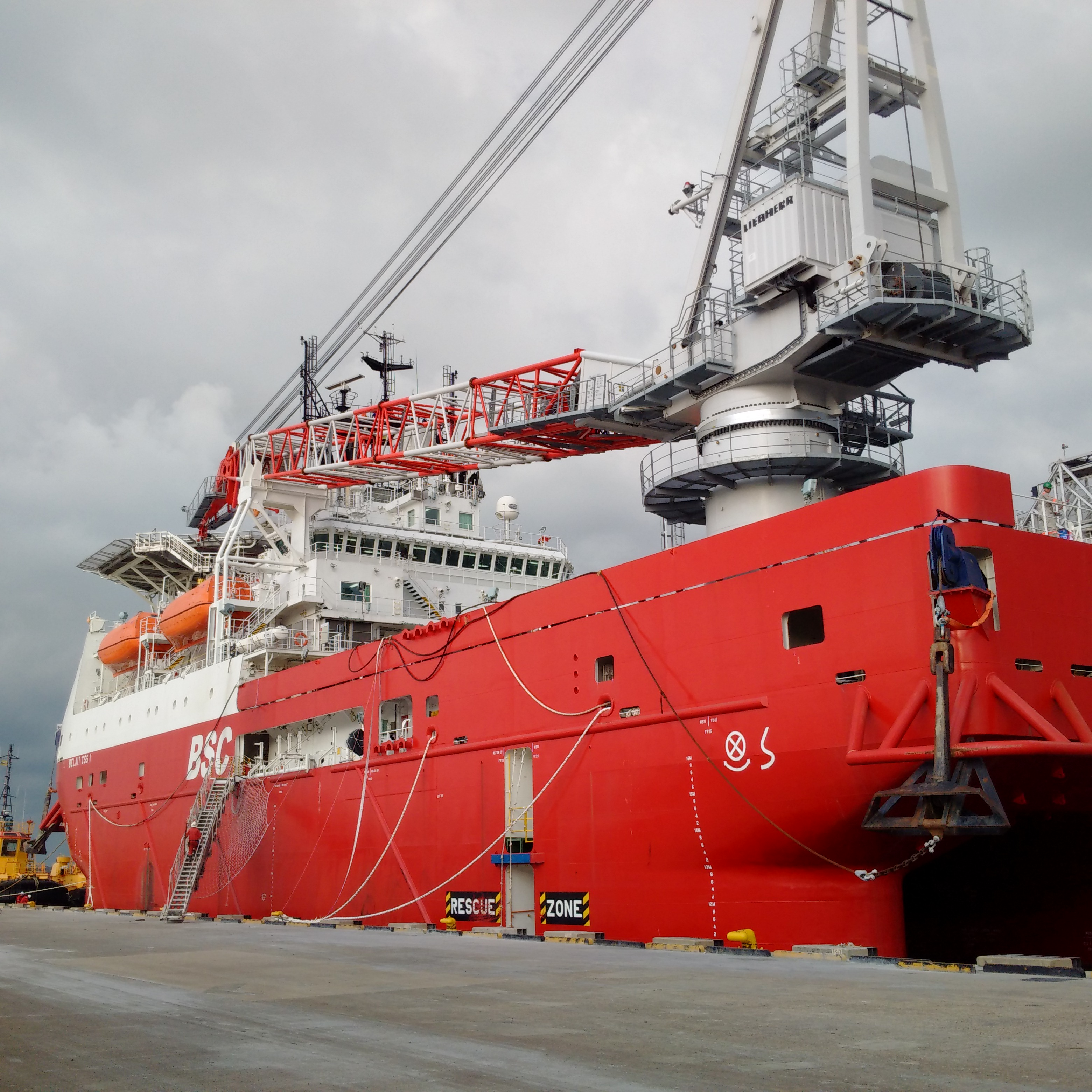
Belait CSS-1 docked in Muara Port on 22 May 2015.

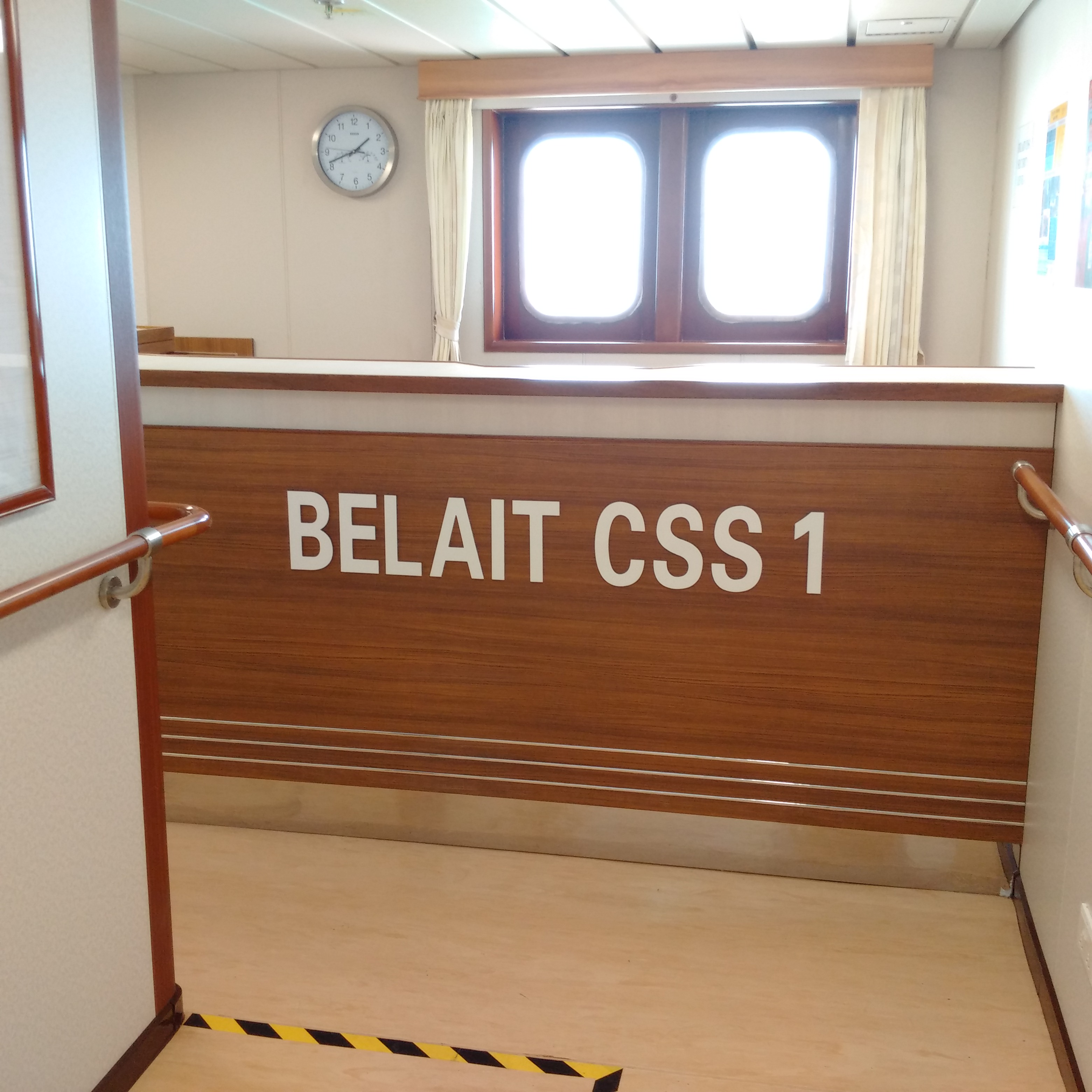
Belait CSS-1's arrival counter.
