= Subsea production system =

Wells located on the seabed

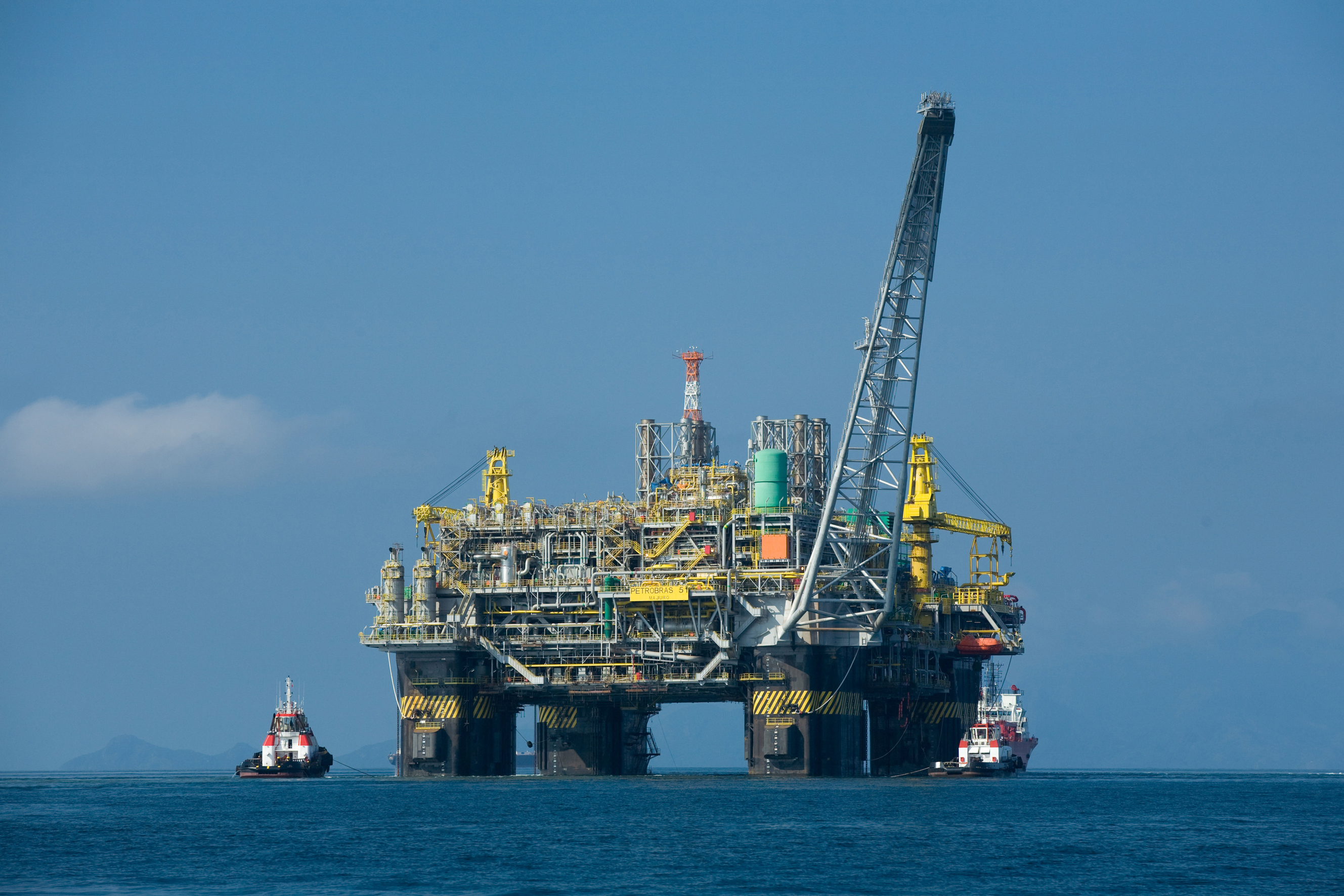
Oil platform P-51 off the Brazilian coast is a semi-submersible platform

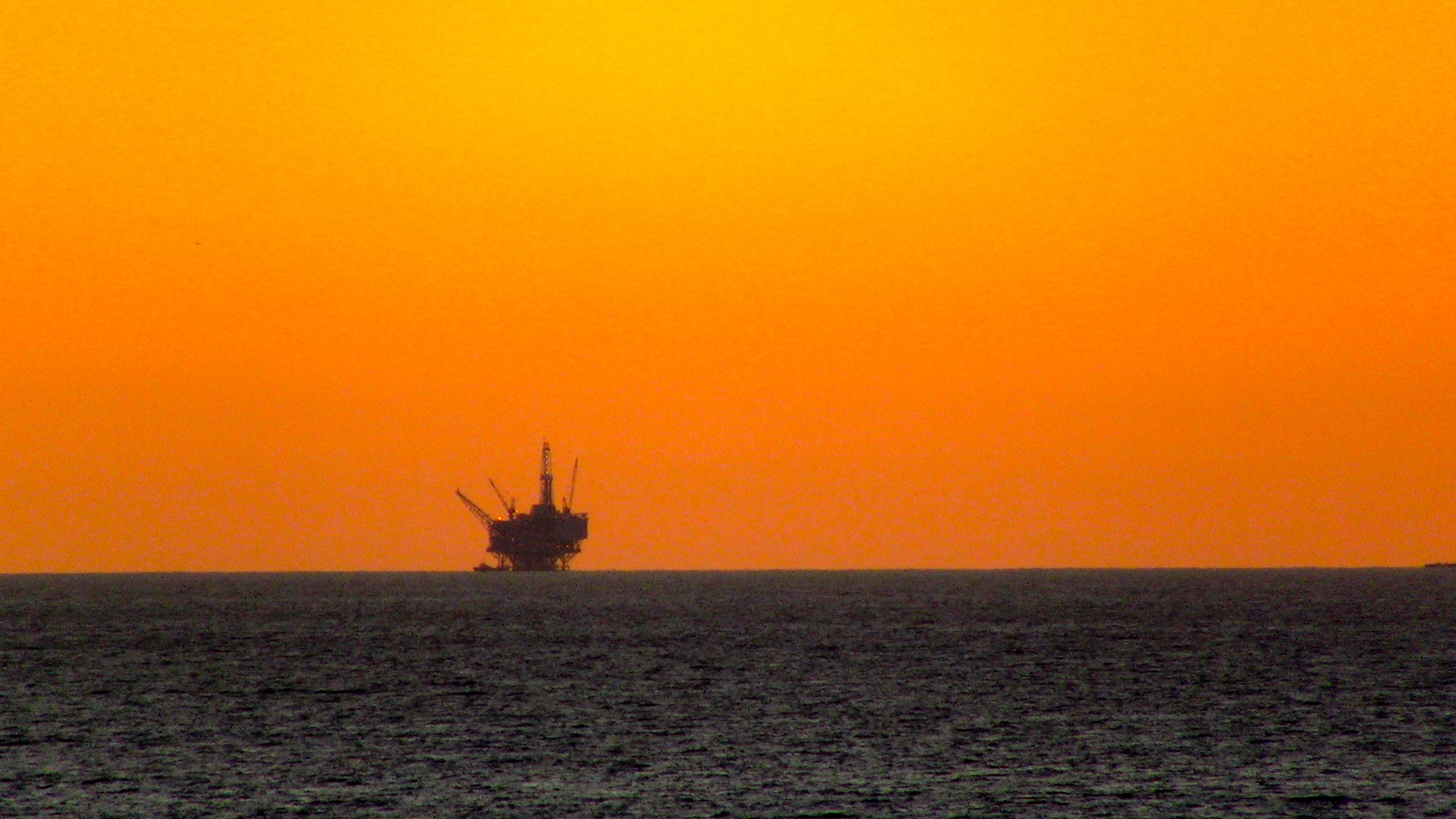
An oil drilling platform off the coast of Santa Barbara, CA

Subsea production systems are typical wells located on the seabed, shallow or deep water. Generally termed as a Floating production system, where the petroleum is extracted at the seabed and the same can be tied back to an already existing production platform or an onshore facility. The oil platform well is drilled by a movable rig and the extracted oil or natural gas is transported by submarine pipeline under the sea and then to rise to a processing facility. It is classified into

- Subsea production control system
- Subsea structures and manifold system
- Subsea intervention system
- Subsea umbilical system
- Subsea processing system

== See also ==
- Christmas tree (oil well)
- List of offshore wind farms
- Marine engineering
- Ocean engineering
- Offshore geotechnical engineering
- Oil well
- Wellhead
- Riserless Light Well Intervention
- Passive heave compensation
- Subsea (technology)
