= Choke valve =

Internal combustion engine component

In internal combustion engines with carburetors, a choke valve or simply choke modifies the air pressure in the intake manifold, thereby altering the air–fuel ratio entering the engine. Choke valves are generally used in naturally aspirated engines to supply a richer fuel mixture when starting the engine. Most choke valves in engines are butterfly valves mounted upstream of the carburetor jet to restrict air flow there and produce a higher partial vacuum downstream, which increases the fuel draw.

In heavy industrial or fluid engineering contexts, including oil and gas production, a choke valve or choke is a particular design of valve with a solid cylinder placed inside another slotted or perforated cylinder.

== Carburetor ==
Cross-sectional schematic of a basic carburetor, showing the choke valve at top

A choke valve is sometimes installed in the carburetor of internal combustion engines. Its purpose is to restrict the flow of air, thereby enriching the fuel-air mixture while starting the engine. Depending on engine design and application, the valve can be activated manually by the operator of the engine (via a lever or pull handle) or automatically by a temperature-sensitive mechanism called an automatic choke.

Choke valves are important for naturally-aspirated gasoline engines because small droplets of gasoline do not evaporate well within a cold engine. By restricting the flow of air into the throat of the carburetor, the choke valve reduces the pressure inside the throat, which causes a proportionally greater amount of fuel to be pushed from the main jet into the combustion chamber during cold-running operation. Once the engine is warm (from combustion), opening the choke valve restores the carburetor to normal operation, supplying fuel and air in the correct stoichiometric ratio for clean, efficient combustion.

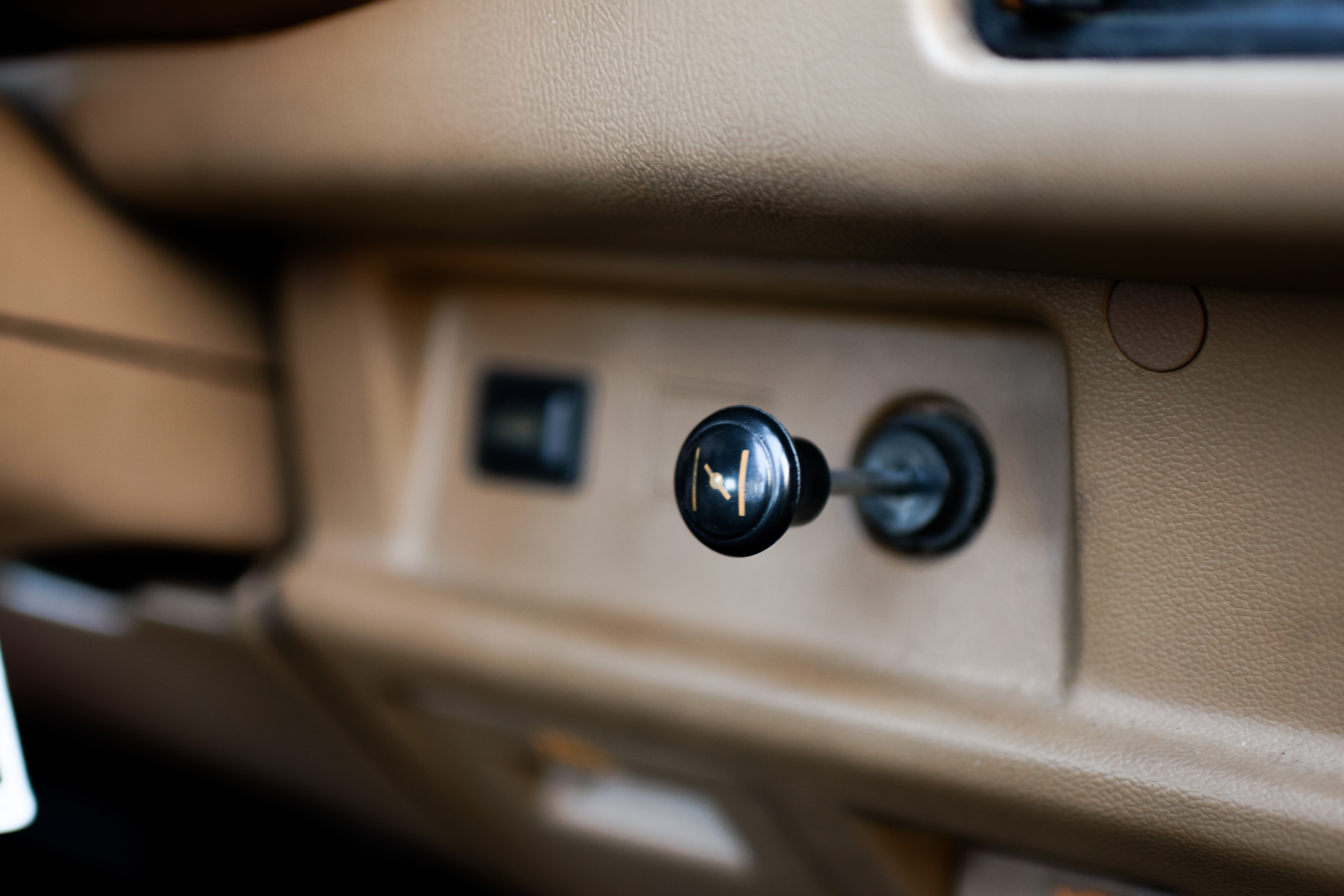
The manual choke pull handle in a 1989 Hyundai Excel

The term "choke" is applied to the carburetor's enrichment device even when it works by a totally different method. Commonly, SU carburettors have "chokes" that work by lowering the fuel jet to a narrower part of the needle. Some others work by introducing an additional fuel route to the constant depression chamber.

Chokes were nearly universal in automobiles until fuel injection began to supplant carburetors. Choke valves are still common in other internal-combustion engines, including most small portable engines, motorcycles, small propeller-driven airplanes, riding lawn mowers, and normally-aspirated marine engines.

== Industrial ==
In the extraction of petroleum (and other heavy-duty fluid handling contexts), a choke valve (or "choke") is an adjustable flow limiter that is designed to operate at a large pressure drop, at a large flow rate, for a long time. A choke is often a part of the "Christmas tree" at the wellhead.

The most familiar choke design is a solid cylinder (called a "plug" or "stem") that closely fits inside another cylinder that has multiple small holes through it (the "cage"). Gradually withdrawing the plug uncovers more and more holes, progressively reducing the resistance to flow. If the holes are regularly placed, then the relationship between the position of the valve and the flow coefficient (C_{v}) (the flow rate per unit pressure) is roughly linear. Another design places a closely fitted cylindrical "sleeve" around the outside of the cage rather than a plug inside the cage. A choke may also include a conical valve and valve seat, to ensure complete shutoff.

Fluids flowing into the cage (through all uncovered holes) enter from all sides, producing fluid jets. The jets collide at the center of the cage cylinder, dissipating most of their energy through fluid impinging on fluid, producing less friction and cavitation erosion of the metal valve body. For highly erosive or corrosive fluids, chokes can be made of tungsten carbide or inconel.
