= Seatooth =

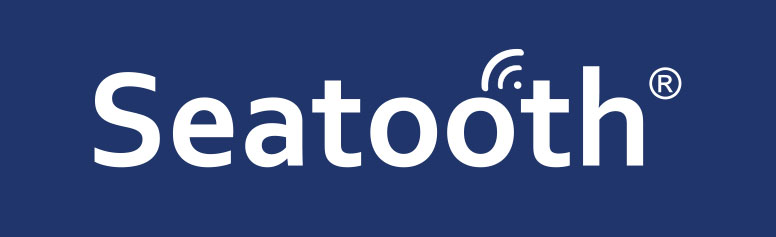
- Industry: Subsea Wireless Local Area Networks (WLAN)
- Compatible hardware: Industrial Controllers (ICS), Sensors
- Typically less than 50m, up to 750m
- Website: csignum.com

Seatooth is a wireless technology standard for exchanging data through water and the water-air boundary using low frequency radio waves (from 1 Hz to 2.485 GHz). WFS Technologies Ltd launched Seatooth, the world's first commercially available underwater radio modem, to the subsea market in 2006. 2007 saw the launch of the first underwater wireless broadband data link, followed by the first hybrid radio/acoustic modem.

In comparing wireless technologies subsea radio waves prefer shallow water and can cross the air/water/seabed boundaries easily. Subsea radio communication is generally limited to under 50 meters (160 feet) through seawater. Subsea radio waves are unaffected by turbidity, salinity and pressure gradients and also has a notable difference between acoustic and optical technologies, in that radio waves can pass through the water-air and water-seabed boundaries easily. Subsea acoustics are efficient at long-range of up to 20 kilometers (12 miles) and have relatively low power consumption for their range. Acoustic communication systems generally perform poorly in shallow water and complex environments and has a limited bandwidth. Subsea optical has an ultra-high bandwidth and a very short range. Subsea optical communication does not cross the water/air boundary and is susceptible to turbidity. Most underwater sensor networks choose acoustics as the medium for wireless transmission. Electromagnetic waves offer great merits for transmission in special underwater environments. Applications for subsea wireless sensor technologies can include subsea wireless sensor networks (WSN) for production monitoring, or oil and gas pipeline monitoring within a wireless linear sensor network (LSN).
