= Energy Valley =

Coordinates: 59°49′39″N 10°26′07″E

The Energy Valley, formerly called Subsea Valley (SSV) is a business cluster organization of Norwegian subsea engineering companies in Fornebu, Sandvika, Asker, Tranby, Drammen, Hokksund and Kongsberg, totaling approximately 75 km in length. The organization consists of 184 firms and incorporates three of the five major subsea engineering companies that compete in the industry. The major engineering companies within the EV are FMC Technologies, Aker Solutions and GE Vetco. With regard to subsea production systems, Norwegian suppliers have gained global market shares in the range of 60-70%, and companies such as FMC Technologies, Aker Solutions, and GE are truly global players within this segment. The competitors located outside the cluster are Cameron and DrillQuip. A report by TESS stated that in addition to the companies, which are present in the SSV area, as many as 600 companies are in one way or another connected to the valley. The three central companies in Subsea Valley—FMC Technologies, Aker Solutions and GE Vetco – are supplying oil & gas extraction equipment to such hydrocarbon operators as Statoil, Exxon and Petrobras.

== History ==
The Subsea Valley cluster organization was formally established on June 8, 2010. Some early members were FMC Technologies, Aker Solutions, BI Drammen and TESS as. TESS largely took the initiative with help from BI Drammen. In its early phase a vision of developing into a "global knowledge hub", thus keeping the world leading competence simultaneously with further developments in the industry, was declared by the SSV. Erik Jølberg adds further that some cluster specific initiatives have been recorded. The establishment of a subsea program at the Buskerud College with FMC employees as teachers began in January 2011. An internet page has been set up. To facilitate inter-firm communication, the "Speed Match meeting" has been established, allowing suppliers and producers to meet for 15 minutes and discuss their products and needs. Also, attempts to secure funding from governmental institutions (e.g., Innovasjon Norge) have been undertaken.

In 2019 the cluster organization was rebranded as Energy Valley.
