= Christmas tree (oil well) =

Assembly of flow-regulating valves

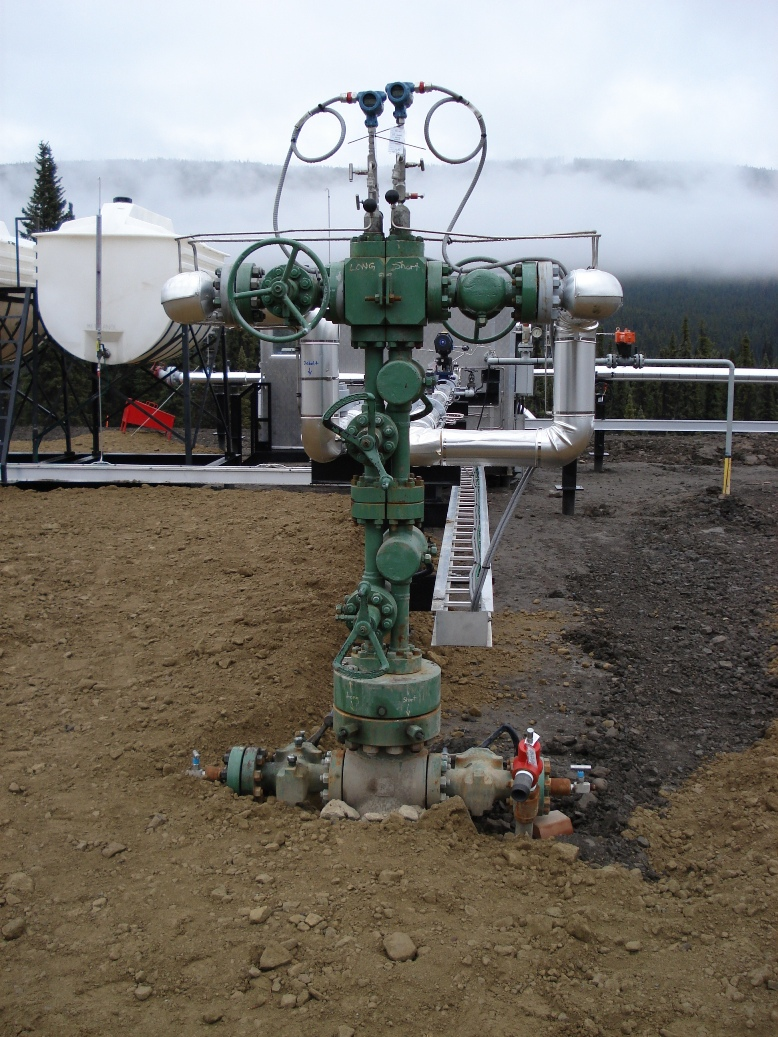
Oil well Christmas tree

In petroleum and natural gas extraction, a Christmas tree, or tree, is an assembly of valves, casing spools, and fittings used to regulate the flow of pipes in an oil well, gas well, water injection well, water disposal well, gas injection well, condensate well, and other types of well.

== Overview ==
The first primitive Christmas tree was used by the Hamill Brothers to bring Spindletop under control. It consisted of a T-valve, with a 6-inch (150 mm) and 8-inch (200 mm) valve on the vertical pipe, and a 6-inch valve on the horizontal pipe. The vertical valve was closed first, and then the valve to the horizontal pipe.

Christmas trees are used on both surface and subsea wells. It is common to identify the type of tree as either "subsea tree" or "surface tree". Each of these classifications has a number of variations. Examples of subsea include conventional, dual bore, mono bore, TFL (through flow line), horizontal, mudline, mudline horizontal, side valve, and TBT (through-bore tree) trees. The deepest installed subsea tree is in the Gulf of Mexico at approximately 9,000 feet (2,700 m). Current technical limits are up to around 3,000 metres and working temperatures of −50 to 350 °F (−46 to 177 °C) with a pressure of up to 15,000 psi (100 MPa).

The primary function of a tree is to control the flow, usually oil or gas, out of the well. (A tree may also be used to control the injection of gas or water into a non-producing well in order to enhance production rates of oil from other wells.) When the well and facilities are ready to produce and receive oil or gas, tree valves are opened and the formation fluids are allowed to go through a flow line. This leads to a processing facility, storage depot and/or other pipeline eventually leading to a refinery or distribution center (for gas). Flow lines on subsea wells usually lead to a fixed or floating production platform or to a storage ship or barge, known as a floating storage offloading vessel (FSO), or floating processing unit (FPU), or floating production, storage and offloading vessel (FPSO).

A tree often provides numerous additional functions including chemical injection points, well intervention means, pressure relief means, monitoring points (such as pressure, temperature, corrosion, erosion, sand detection, flow rate, flow composition, valve and choke valve position feedback), and connection points for devices such as down hole pressure and temperature transducers (DHPT). On producing wells, chemicals or alcohols or oil distillates may be injected to preclude production problems (such as blockages).

Functionality may be extended further by using the control system on a subsea tree to monitor, measure, and react to sensor outputs on the tree or even down the well bore. The control system attached to the tree controls the downhole safety valve (SCSSV, DHSV, SSSV) while the tree acts as an attachment and conduit means of the control system to the downhole safety valve.

Tree complexity has increased over the last few decades. They are frequently manufactured from blocks of steel containing multiple valves rather than being assembled from individual flanged components. This is especially true in subsea applications where the resemblance to Christmas trees no longer exists given the frame and support systems into which the main valve block is integrated.

Note that a tree and wellhead are separate pieces of equipment not to be mistaken as the same piece. The Christmas tree is installed on top of the wellhead. A wellhead is used without a Christmas tree during drilling operations, and also for riser tie-back situations that later would have a tree installed at riser top. Wells being produced with rod pumps (pump jacks, nodding donkeys, grasshopper pumps, and so on) frequently do not utilize any tree owing the absence of a pressure-containment requirement.

== Valves ==
Subsea and surface trees have a large variety of valve configurations and combinations of manual and/or actuated (hydraulic or pneumatic) valves. Examples are identified in API Specifications 6A nd 17D.

A basic surface tree consists of two or three manual valves (usually gate valves because of their flow characteristics, i.e. low restriction to the flow of fluid when fully open).

A typical sophisticated surface tree will have at least four or five valves, normally arranged in a crucifix type pattern (hence the endurance of the term "Christmas tree"). The two lower valves are called the master valves (upper and lower respectively). Master valves are normally in the fully open position and are never opened or closed when the well is flowing (except in an emergency) to prevent erosion of the valve sealing surfaces. The lower master valve will normally be manually operated, while the upper master valve is often hydraulically actuated, allowing it to be used as a means of remotely shutting in the well in the event of emergency. An actuated wing valve is normally used to shut in the well when flowing, thus preserving the master valves for positive shut off for maintenance purposes. Hydraulic operated wing valves are usually built to be fail safe closed, meaning they require active hydraulic pressure to stay open. This feature means that if control fluid fails the well will automatically shut itself in without operator action.

The right hand valve is often called the flow wing valve or the production wing valve, because it is in the flowpath the hydrocarbons take to production facilities (or the path water or gas will take from production to the well in the case of injection wells).

The left hand valve is often called the kill wing valve (KWV). It is primarily used for injection of fluids such as corrosion inhibitors or methanol to prevent hydrate formation. In the North Sea, it is called the non-active side arm (NASA). It is typically manually operated.

The valve at the top is called the swab valve and lies in the path used for well interventions like wireline and coiled tubing. For such operations, a lubricator is rigged up onto the top of the tree and the wire or coil is lowered through the lubricator, past the swab valve and into the well. This valve is typically manually operated.

Some trees have a second swab valve, the two arranged one on top of the other. The intention is to allow rigging down equipment from the top of the tree with the well flowing while preserving the two-barrier rule. With only a single swab valve, the upper master valve is usually closed to act as the second barrier, forcing the well to be shut in for a day during rig down operations. However, avoiding delaying production for a day is usually too small a gain to be worth the extra expense of having a Christmas tree with a second swab valve.

Subsea trees are available in either vertical or horizontal configurations with further speciality available such as dual bore, monobore, concentric, drill-through, mudline, guidelineless or guideline. Sub-systems of Subsea trees, might also be further customized to fit individual well needs. Subsea trees may range in size and weight from a few tons to approximately 70 tons for high pressure, deepwater (deeper than 3,000 ft or 910 m) guidelineless applications. Subsea trees contain many additional valves and accessories compared to surface trees. Typically, a subsea tree would have a choke valve (permits control of flow), a flowline connection interface (hub, flange or other connection), subsea control interface (direct hydraulic, electro hydraulic, or electric), and sensors for gathering data such as pressure, temperature, sand flow, erosion, multiphase flow, and single phase flow such as water or gas.

== Surface and subsea Christmas tree images ==
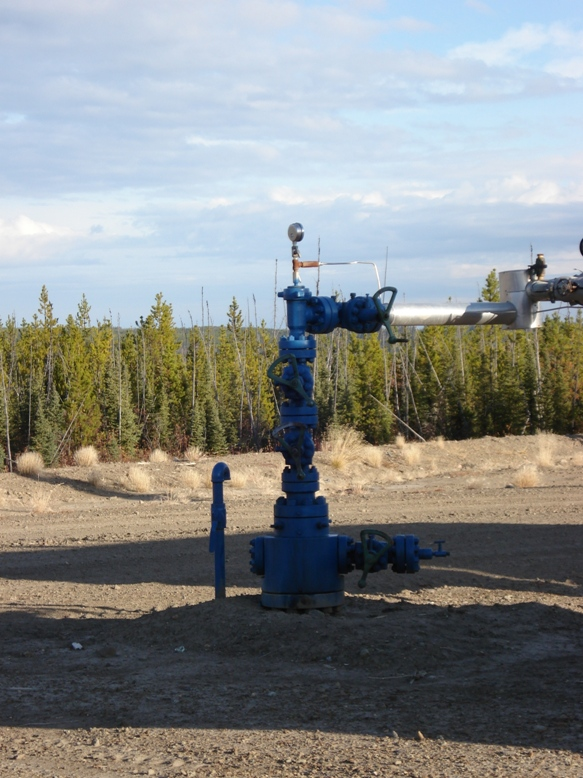

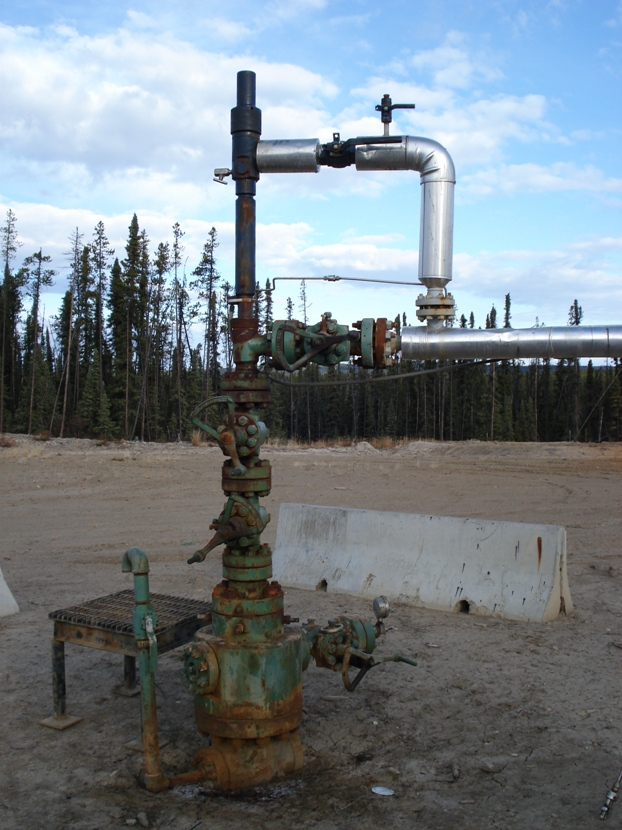

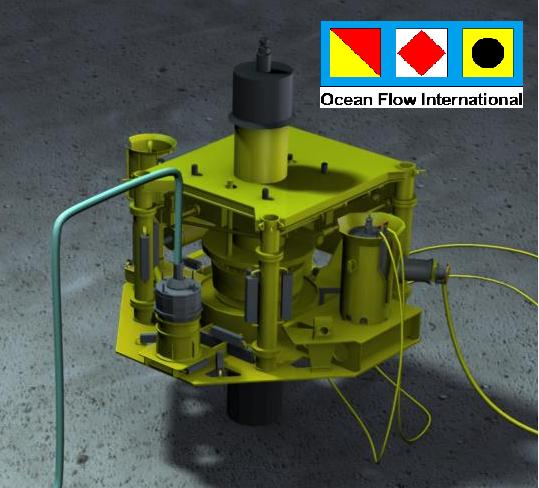

== See also ==
- Completion – Last operation for oil and gas wells
- Oilfield – Subsurface pool of hydrocarbons
- Oil well – Well drilled to extract crude oil and/or gas
