= Subsea technology =

Technology of submerged operations in the sea

Subsea technology involves fully submerged ocean equipment, operations, or applications, especially when some distance offshore, in deep ocean waters, or on the seabed. The term subsea is frequently used in connection with oceanography, marine or ocean engineering, ocean exploration, remotely operated vehicle (ROVs) autonomous underwater vehicles (AUVs), submarine communications or power cables, underwater habitats, seafloor mineral mining, oil and gas, and offshore wind power.

== Oil and gas ==
Oil and gas fields reside beneath many inland waters and offshore areas around the world, and in the oil and gas industry the term subsea relates to the exploration, drilling and development of oil and gas fields in these underwater locations. Under water oil fields and facilities are generically referred to using a subsea prefix, such as subsea well, subsea field, subsea project, and subsea developments.

Subsea oil field developments are usually split into Shallow water and Deepwater categories to distinguish between the different facilities and approaches that are needed. The term shallow water or shelf is used for very shallow water depths where bottom-founded facilities like jackup drilling rigs and fixed offshore structures can be used, and where saturation diving is feasible. Deepwater is a term often used to refer to offshore projects located in water depths greater than around 600 feet (180 m), where floating drilling vessels and floating oil platforms are used, and remotely operated underwater vehicles are required as crewed diving is not practical.

Subsea completions can be traced back to 1943 with the Lake Erie completion at a 35 ft (11 m) water depth. The well had a land-type Christmas tree that required diver intervention for installation, maintenance, and flow line connections. Shell completed its first subsea well in the Gulf of Mexico in 1961.

=== Systems ===
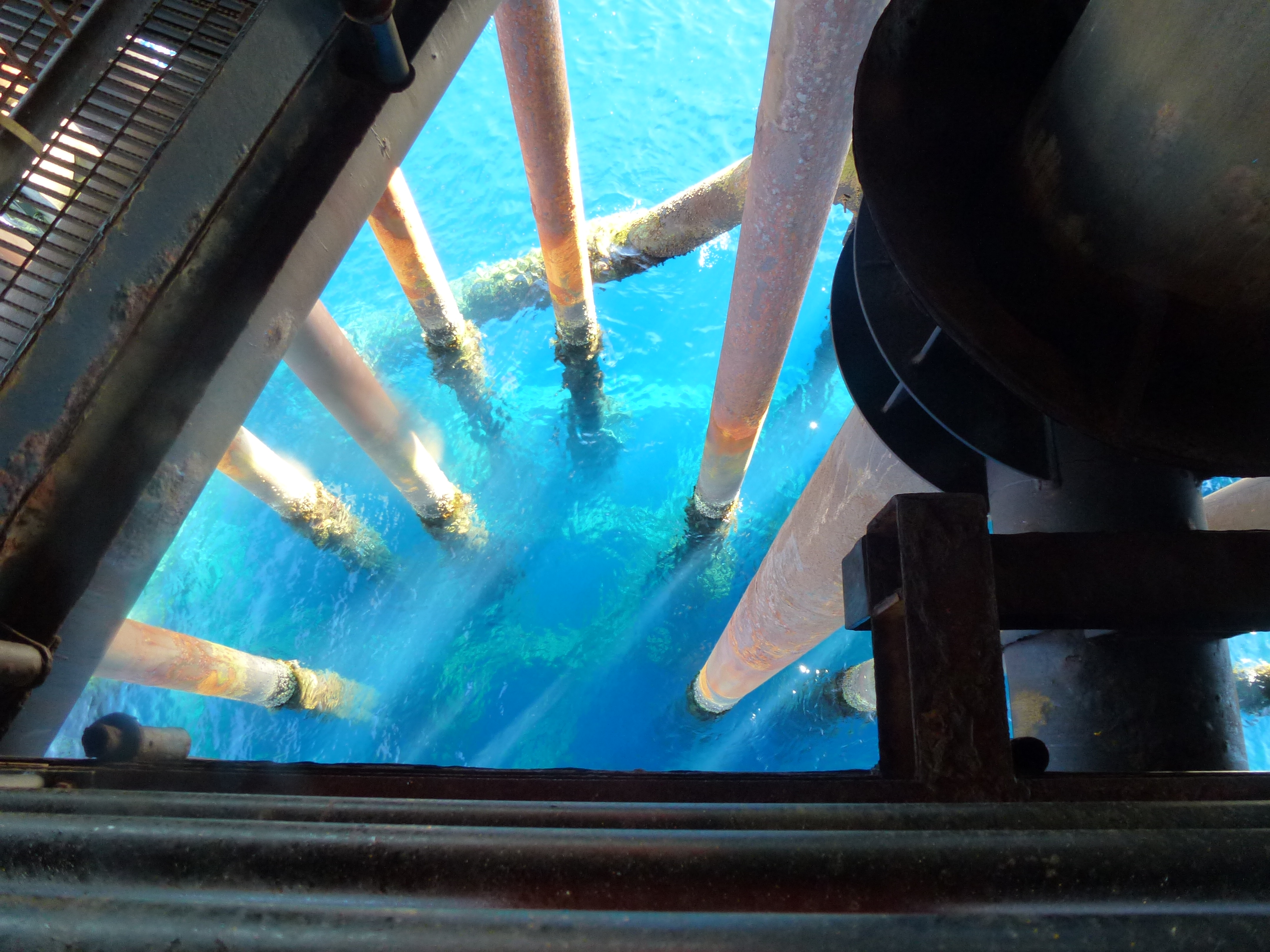
Subsea risers beneath an offshore oil platform

Subsea oil production systems can range in complexity from a single satellite well with a flowline linked to a fixed platform, FPSO or an onshore installation, to several wells on a template or clustered around a manifold, and transferring to a fixed or floating facility, or directly to an onshore installation.

Subsea production systems can be used to develop reservoirs, or parts of reservoirs, which require drilling of the wells from more than one location. Deep water conditions, or even ultradeep water conditions, can also inherently dictate development of a field by means of a subsea production system, since traditional surface facilities such as on a steel-piled jacket, might be either technically unfeasible or uneconomical due to the water depth.

The development of subsea oil and gas fields requires specialized equipment. The equipment must be reliable enough to safeguard the environment and make the exploitation of the subsea hydrocarbons economically feasible. The deployment of such equipment requires specialized and expensive vessels, which need to be equipped with diving equipment for relatively shallow equipment work (i.e. a few hundred feet water depth maximum) and robotic equipment for deeper water depths. Any requirement to repair or intervene with installed subsea equipment is thus normally very expensive. This type of expense can result in economic failure of the subsea development.

Subsea technology in offshore oil and gas production is a highly specialized field of application with particular demands on engineering and simulation. Most of the new oil fields are located in deep water and are generally referred to as deepwater systems. Development of these fields sets strict requirements for verification of the various systems’ functions and their compliance with current requirements and specifications. This is because of the high costs and time involved in changing a pre-existing system due to the specialized vessels with advanced onboard equipment. A full-scale test (System Integration Test – SIT) does not provide satisfactory verification of deepwater systems because the test, for practical reasons, cannot be performed under conditions identical to those under which the system will later operate. The oil industry has therefore adopted modern data technology as a tool for virtual testing of deepwater systems that enables detection of costly faults at an early phase of the project. By using modern simulation tools, models of deepwater systems can be set up and used to verify the system's functions, and dynamic properties, against various requirements specifications. This includes the model-based development of innovative high-tech plants and system solutions for the exploitation and production of energy resources in an environmentally friendly way as well as the analysis and evaluation of the dynamic behavior of components and systems used for the production and distribution of oil and gas. Another part is the real-time virtual test of systems for subsea production, subsea drilling, supply above sea level, seismography, subsea construction equipment, and subsea process measurement and control equipment.

== Offshore wind power ==
The power transmission infrastructure for offshore wind power utilizes a variety of subsea technologies for the installation and maintenance of submarine power transmission cables and other electrical energy equipment. In addition, the monopile foundations of fixed-bottom wind turbines and the anchoring and cable structures of floating wind turbines are regularly inspected with a variety of shipborne subsea technology.

== Underwater mining ==
Recent technological advancements have given rise to the use of remotely operated vehicles (ROVs) to collect mineral samples from prospective mine sites. Using drills and other cutting tools, the ROVs obtain samples to be analyzed for desired minerals. Once a site has been located, a mining ship or station is set up to mine the area.

Seafloor mineral mining of seafloor massive sulfide deposits (so named for the sulfide molecules, not the deposit size) are a developing subsea mineral mining industry. Nautilus Minerals Inc. had begun to establish a new industry by commercially exploring and, in the future, planned to extract copper, gold, silver and zinc in its Solwara 1 Project. The project was establishing its operations 1 mile (1.6 km) beneath the ocean surface in the Bismarck Sea near Papua New Guinea. When fully underway the operation would have been the world’s first commercial deep sea mining project. First production was expected to begin in 2017, but the company went bankrupt in 2019 after failing to secure funding for the project.

== Remotely operated vehicles ==
Remotely Operated Vehicles (ROVs) are robotic pieces of equipment operated from afar to perform tasks on the sea floor. ROVs are available in a wide variety of function capabilities and complexities from simple "eyeball" camera devices, to multi-appendage machines that require multiple operators to operate or "fly" the equipment.

Other Professional Equipments used in installation of Sub Sea Telecommunication cable are specially designed crafts, modular barges, Water Pump along with Diving support and other accessories to seamlessly conduct installation operations in Deep Sea and Near Shore end, Rivers, Lakes. There are few professional companies in the world who own, operate such equipments and carry out operations worldwide on turnkey basis.

== Energy harvesting and production ==
Subsea energy technologies are the subject of investigation using a number of technical strategies, none of which have yet been commercialized to become viable products or new energy industries. Energy sources under investigation include utility scale power production from ocean currents, such as the rapid currents found in the waters between the Florida Straits and Cape Hatteras. Research and projects are developing to harvest energy from hydrothermal vents to provide power for subsea ocean research instruments, developing autonomous vehicle recharge technologies, seabed sensor systems, and environmental research applications. Other investigations include harvesting energy from differences in temperature that occur with varied ocean depth, and microbial fuel cells that produce energy from organisms in ocean seafloor sediments.

Current methods for providing power for electric applications on offshore seabeds are limited to the use of batteries, power provided from generators on ships or platforms with fossil fuel generators, or for lower power requirements, wind, solar, or wave energy harvesting buoys.

== Organizations ==
A number of professional societies and trade bodies are involved with the subsea industry around the world. Such groups include

- Subsea Engineering Society
- Society for Underwater Technology
- Subsea Project Awards
- Global Underwater Hub
- Subsea Valley The largest subsea technology business cluster.
- Society of Petroleum Engineers
- American Petroleum Institute (API)
- American Society of Mechanical Engineers (ASME)
- National Association of Corrosion Engineers (NACE)
- International Marine Contractors Association (IMCA)

Government agencies administer regulations in their territorial waters around the world. Examples of such government agencies are the Minerals Management Service (MMS, US), Norwegian Petroleum Directorate (NPD, Norway), and Health & Safety Executive (HSE, UK). The MMS administers the mineral resources in the US (using Code of Federal Regulations (CFR)) and provides management of all the US subsea mineral and renewable energy resources.

== See also ==
- Christmas tree (oil well)
- List of offshore wind farms
- Marine engineering
- Ocean engineering
- Offshore geotechnical engineering
- Oil well
- Passive heave compensation
- Submarine pipeline
- Subsea production system
- Wellhead
