= Accommodation platform =

Platform designed to provide living quarters for people

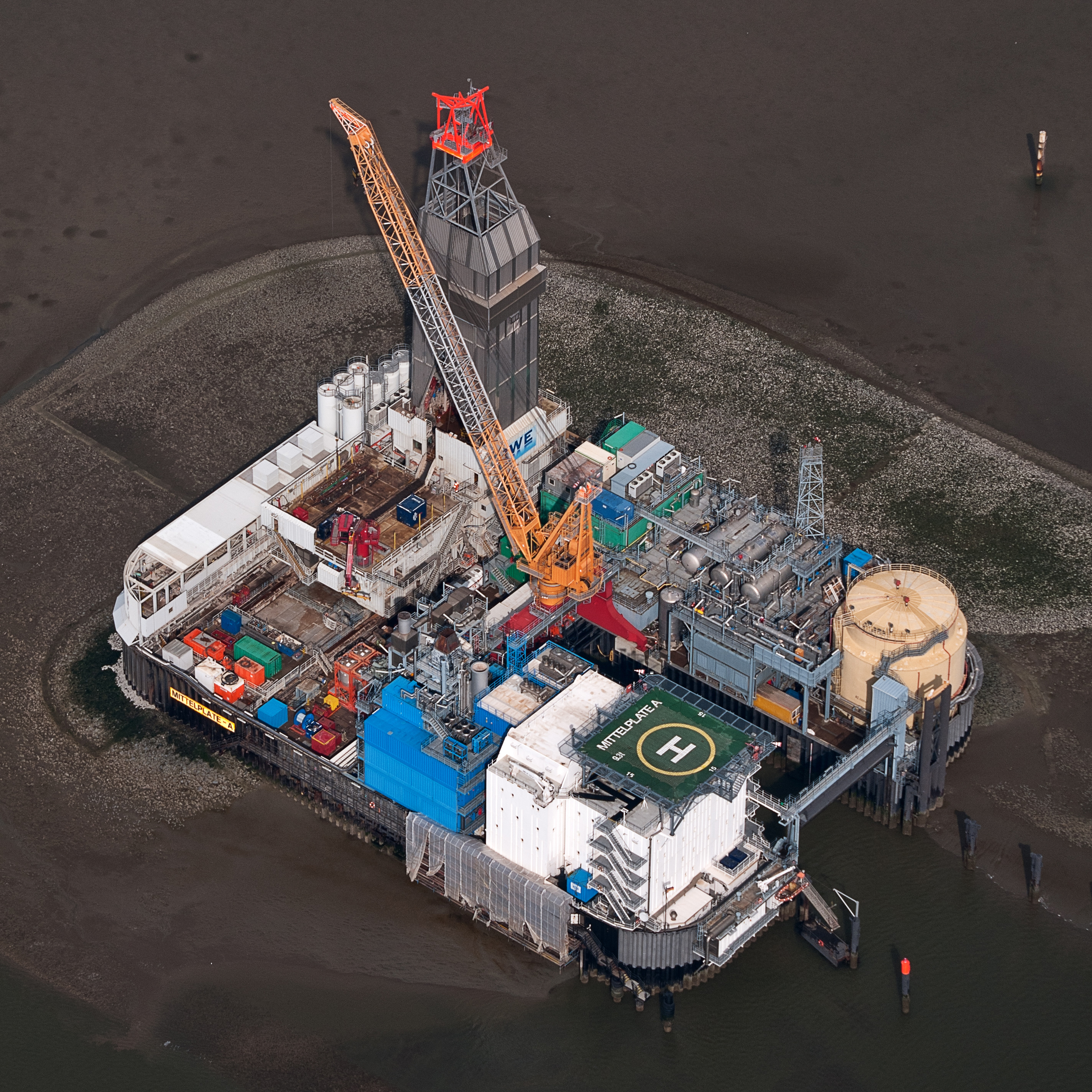
Oil platform Mittelplate includes an accommodation platform.

An accommodation platform is an offshore platform which supports living quarters for offshore personnel. These are often associated with the petroleum industry, although other industries use them as well, such as the wind farm Horns Rev 2.

== Definitions ==
In the oil and gas industry an accommodation platform may be a flotel, providing living quarters for personnel temporarily engaged in construction or maintenance activities. It also refers to a permanent platform bridge-linked to production and wellhead platforms. It provides living quarters and a safe refuge remote from the potential hazards of the drilling and hydrocarbon plant.

=== Designation ===
Accommodation platforms may be designated 'A' (Accommodation), 'LQ' (Living Quarters), 'Q' (Quarters), 'UQ' (Utility & Quarters). Only low hazard equipment and fluids are located on the accommodation platform to reduce the risk of fire or explosion.

== Facilities ==
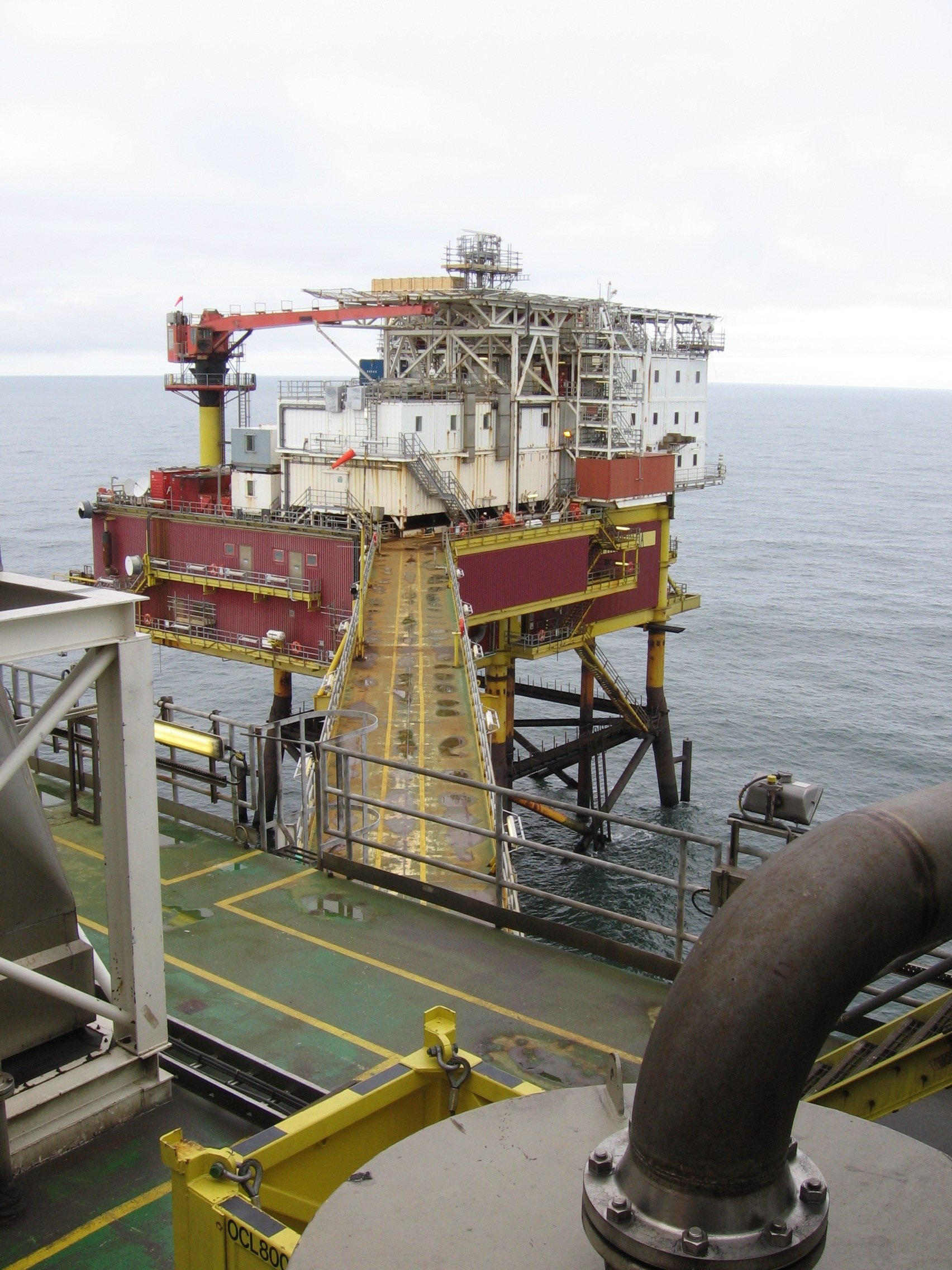
North Sea Viking accommodation platform BA is bridge-linked to the rest of the B complex

Accommodation platforms may comprise:

- Sleeping quarters, ideally no more than two people per cabin with shower, toilet, washing and personal storage facilities
- Galley for food preparation and serving
- Eating (mess) facilities
- Food storage: dry store, refrigeration and freezing facilities
- Waste handling and storage
- Laundry facilities, washing and drying clothes and bedding
- Sick bay and Qualified Medic
- Recreation facilities: cinema, quiet room, games, gym, sauna
- Installation control room, including telecommunications
- Crew offices: Offshore Installation Manager; Production team leader; Maintenance team leader, Drilling team leader
- Boot/Locker room for changing between indoor and outdoor clothes, toilets, washing facilities
- Heating, Ventilation and Air Conditioning (HVAC) systems
- Fire, smoke and gas detection systems
- Helideck
- Lifeboats

=== Utility systems ===
Low hazard utility systems may be located on the Accommodation platform

- Black-start and Emergency power generation
- Firewater (seawater lift) pump(s) and fire fighting facilities
- Instrument and plant air compression
- Potable water plant for making and storing drinking water
- Aviation fuel storage and refueling for helicopter
- Sewage treatment and disposal
- Non-hazardous drains

== Supply and disposal ==
Consumable materials such as foodstuffs and potable water are delivered to the platform by supply boat, and are offloaded from the boat by platform mounted crane. The boat will also take waste material from the platform for recycling onshore.

== See also ==
- Deep sea habitat
