= Drilling engineering =

Subset of petroleum engineering

Drilling engineering is a subset of petroleum engineering.

Drilling engineers design and implement procedures to drill wells as safely and economically as possible. They work closely with the drilling contractor, service contractors, and compliance personnel, as well as with geologists and other technical specialists. The drilling engineer has the responsibility for ensuring that costs are minimized while getting information to evaluate the formations penetrated, protecting the health and safety of workers and other personnel, and protecting the environment.

== Overview ==
The planning phases involved in drilling an oil or gas well typically involve estimating the value of sought reserves, estimating the costs to access reserves, acquiring property by a mineral lease, a geological survey, a well bore plan, and a layout of the type of equipment required to reach the depth of the well. Drilling engineers are in charge of the process of planning and drilling the wells. Their responsibilities include:

- Designing well programs (e.g., casing sizes and setting depths) to prevent blowouts (uncontrolled well-fluid release) while allowing adequate formation evaluation
- Designing or contributing to the design of casing strings and cementing plans, directional drilling plans, drilling fluids programs, and drill string and drill bit programs
- Specifying equipment, material and ratings and grades to be used in the drilling process
- Providing technical support and audit during the drilling process
- Performing cost estimates and analysis
- Developing contracts with vendors

Drilling engineers are often degreed as petroleum engineers, although they may come from other technical disciplines (e.g., mechanical engineering, electrical engineering or geology) and subsequently be trained by an oil and gas company. They also may have practical experience as a rig hand or mudlogger or mud engineer.

== See also ==
- Well logging
- Mud logging
- MWD (measurement while drilling)
- LWD (logging while drilling)
- Geosteering
- Expandable tubular technology
- American Association of Drilling Engineers

== Suggested reading ==
- Hyne, N.J. (2000). Nontechnical Guide to Petroleum Geology, Exploration, Drilling and Production. PennWell Corp. ISBN 087814823X.
- Journal of Petroleum Technology, Society of Petroleum Engineers
