= Bottom hole assembly =

Drilling rig component

A bottom hole assembly (BHA) is a component of a drilling rig. It is the lowest part of the drill string, extending from the bit to the drill pipe. The assembly can consist of drill collars, subs such as stabilisers, reamers, shocks, hole-openers, and the bit sub and bit.

The BHA design is based upon the requirements of having enough weight transfer to the bit (WOB) to be able to drill and achieve a sufficient Rate of Penetration (ROP), giving the Driller or Directional Driller directional control to drill as per the planned trajectory and to also include whatever Logging While Drilling (LWD) / Measurement While Drilling (MWD) tools for formation evaluation. As such BHA design can vary greatly from simple vertical wells with little or no LWD requirements to complex directional wells which must run multi-combo LWD suites.

Prior to running a BHA most oilfield service providers have software to model the BHA behaviour such as the maximum WOB achievable, the directional tendencies & capabilities and even the natural harmonics of the assembly as to avoid vibration brought about by exciting natural frequencies.

== Variations ==
=== Rotary assembly ===
Rotary assemblies are commonly used where formations are predictable and the rig economics are an issue. In such an assembly the weight of the drill collars gives the BHA the tendency to sag or flex to the low side of the hole, collar stiffness length and stabiliser diameter and placement are engineered as a means of controlling the flex of the BHA. This will bring about the desired hold, build or drop tendency.

The ability to vary the directional tendency of the assembly comes from varying the weight on the bit. A fixed assembly has only one directional tendency. The weight on bit allows you to tune that tendency.

The bottom-hole assembly (BHA) can be:

- slick with no stabilisers
- a pendulum bottom-hole assembly for reducing the deviation of a well
- packed with stabilisers for a straight hole / a short lock assembly
- a fulcrum for increasing the deviation of the well / a long lock assembly

Bottom-hole assemblies are also described as

- specialized, such as articulated,
- steerable, and
- oriented or non-oriented.

=== Fulcrum / Long Lock ===
This assembly is used to build angle. The assembly usually incorporates a near bit stabiliser. Behind this would be a selection of drill collars and Heavy Weight Drill Pipe (HWDP). The length of the section AFTER the near bit stabilizer would determine the extent of the angle build rate.

After the appropriate length of pipe after the near bit stabiliser you would place a drill string stabiliser.

In short the longer the gap between the near bit and the drill string stabiliser the greater the angle building rate. Care must be taken to not have this section too long as the pipe may sag too much and rub against the borehole wall. This could result in key seating and pipe digging into the borehole wall.

=== Stabilisation / Short Lock ===
This assembly is usually used to maintain borehole angle. This assembly is very rigid allowing little movement of the bit.

Such an assembly would mean that the stabilisers are closely packed: a near bit stabiliser within 0–30 feet of the drill bit, and two more spaced 30 and 60 feet beyond it. If a short drill collar is used, then the stabilisers can be even closer together.

The shorter the distance between the stabilisers means that the drill collars bend less and the weight on bit (WOB) pushes directly on the bit, hence maintaining the angle.

=== Pendulum assembly ===
A pendulum assembly is used to reduce the angle build rate or reduce well-bore angle.

In this assembly there is no near bit assembly. The front portion of the (BHA) is allowed to hang as a result of its own weight. In such a case the first stabiliser is placed 30–45 feet behind the bit.

This hanging means that there is a force acting on the low side of the hole, which causes the deviation. In the case of a straight hole then the bit simply continues downward.

=== BHA configurations ===
There are three types of BHA configurations. These configurations addressed are usually concerned with the use or layout of drill collars, heavy weight drill pipe and standard drill pipe.

Type 1, standard simple configuration, uses only drill pipe and drill collars. In this instance the drill collars provide the necessary weight on the bit.

Type 2 uses heavy weight drill pipe as a transition between the drill collars and the drill pipe. Weight on bit is achieved by the drill collars.

Type 3 uses the drill collars to achieve directional control. The heavy weight drill pipe applies the weight on the bit. Such a layout promotes faster rig floor BHA handling. It may also reduce the tendency for differential sticking.

In most cases the above three types of configurations usually apply to straight/vertical wellbores at most low to medium angle wellbores. For high angle and horizontal wellbore careful weight control of the BHA is a must. In this instance the weight may be applied by running the drill pipe in compression in the high angle section. The high angle may help to stabilise the drill pipe allowing it to carry some compression.

== BHA tools ==
=== Stabiliser ===
A stabiliser is used within a column of drill collars. They help guide the bit in the hole. They play a major part in directional drilling as it helps determine the well-bore path and angle.

It is used to

- equalize the load on the bit;
- prevent whirl of the lower assembly;
- minimize bit walk;
- minimize bending and vibrations that cause tool joint wear;
- prevent collar contact with the sidewall of the bore-hole;
- minimize key-seating with differential pressure;
- restrict lateral movement of the lower BHA as such they lower the strain on the drill collar and BHA connections.

Solid stabilisers have no moving or replaceable parts. The blades and the mandrel can be one piece (integral) or welded to the mandrel (weld-on/welded blade). The blades may be either straight or spiral. The working surface can be impregnated with tungsten carbide or diamonds inserts.

Replaceable blade stabilisers can maintain full gauge stabilization, but their blades can be changed with tools no machining or welding required

Sleeve type stabilisers have replaceable sleeves that can be changed in the field. The sleeves are either rotating or non-rotating.

Reamers are stabilisers that have cutting elements embedded on their fins, and are used to maintain a gauged well-bore. They can be used to drill out doglegs and key-seats in hard formations. Due to the cutting ability of the reamer the bit does less work in maintaining well-bore gauge and more work drilling.

=== Underreamer ===
An underreamer is used to enlarge the well-bore, usually beginning at some point under the surface. It does this by utilizing expandable cutters that only deploy at the designated time or depth. It is not to be confused with hole opening which occurs from the surface and in most cases the hole opener tool is of a fixed diameter.

The underreamer utilises an increase in mud pressure or flow rate to deploy the expandable cutters. A corresponding pressure drop across the tool would indicate that the tool has fully deployed.
