= Log ASCII standard =

Log ASCII standard (LAS) is a standard file format common in the oil-and-gas and water well industries to store well log information. Well logging is used to investigate and characterize the subsurface stratigraphy in a well.

A single LAS file can only contain data for one well, but it can contain any number datasets (called "curves") from that well. Common curves found in a LAS file may include natural gamma, travel time, or resistivity logs.

== Online LAS viewers ==
Several free web-based tools allow users to view and analyze LAS-formatted well-log files without installing specialized software:

- WVU Log Viewer – A browser-based application for visualizing well logs such as gamma-ray, caliper, and spectral logs. Users can upload LAS files and view multiple log tracks with interactive zoom and pan controls.
- Go Geophysical Well Log Data Plotter – An online tool for plotting LAS 2.0 well-log files. It provides a clean, interactive interface for displaying curve data.
- GeophysX – A web application for opening, viewing, and editing LAS and other geological or geophysical data formats. Files can be viewed and modified directly in the browser.

These tools offer convenient, free access to essential well-log visualization features, making them useful for quick data checks and remote access.
