= Gaia Earth Sciences =

Gaia Earth Group
- Type: Private
- Industry: Oil & Gas
- Founded: 2003, Scotland by Stuart Huyton
- Headquarters: Elgin, Moray
- Key people: Stuart Huyton
- Products: Consulting Services
- Website: gaia-earth.co.uk

Gaia Earth Sciences Limited (GESL) (now known as Gaia Earth Group) is a privately owned petrophysics consulting company based in the United Kingdom offering services to the international upstream oil & gas industry. It is a sustaining member of the Petroleum Exploration Society of Great Britain and a sponsor of the London Petrophysical Society and the Aberdeen Formation Evaluation Society.

== History ==
There are two arms of the Gaia Earth Group. Gaia Earth Sciences Limited (GESL) was founded in 2003 by Stuart Huyton, and later in 2014, Huyton founded Gaia Earth Technologies Limited (GETL). Gaia Earth Group now operates across six continents, in over fifty countries worldwide with a group of twenty-five consultants.

The Gaia Earth Group headquarters are in North East Scotland near to the village of Cummingston.

== Services ==
- Wireline log QA/QC is the process by which the quality of acquisition and data is controlled during Wireline (cabling) logging operations in oil wells and gas wells.
- Formation evaluation is the method by which the data acquired during wireline logging are processed and evaluated to produce results which allow an estimation of oil or gas in place, amongst other things.
- Gaia Protection Cabling Systems (GCPS) which consists of wire-pro modelling, benchmarking, standoffs and working with a specialist
- Setting up of wireline standoffs (WLSO) to prevent keyseating and differential cable sticking

== Awards ==
- In 2012, Gaia Earth Sciences was awarded the Queen's Award for Enterprise in International Trade. This is the United Kingdom's most prestigious award for business performance.
- In 2023, both Gaia Earth Sciences and Gaia Earth Technologies were among just 148 organisations to receive King's Award for Enterprise: Innovation.
