= WOB =

WOB, WoB, or wob may refer to:

- Wob, an online bookseller - formerly known as World of Books
- Wolfsburg (German vehicle license plate code)
- Woburn Sands railway station (National Rail code)
- Anderson Regional Transportation Center (Amtrak station code)
- White On Black, a colour scheme used frequently in tabloid newspaper headlines (see Dark mode)
- Way Off Broadway Dinner Theatre
- Weight on bit, the amount of downward force exerted on the drill bit
- Work of breathing, medical term for the effort to move air through the lungs
- World of Beer, a chain of restaurants in the United States
- World of Books, a British second-hand book retailer
