= Penetration rate =

Penetration rate may refer to:

- Market penetration, in marketing, a parameter to show the rate of circulation of a product in its market
- Rate of penetration, or drill rate, the speed at which a drill bit breaks the rock under it to deepen the borehole
- Mobile phone penetration rate is often used to mean the number of active mobile phone users per 100 people within a specific population
