= Nuclear magnetic resonance logging =

Nuclear magnetic resonance (NMR) logging is a type of well logging that uses the NMR response of a formation to directly determine its porosity and permeability, providing a continuous record along the length of the borehole.

== Background ==
NMR logging exploits the large magnetic moment of hydrogen, which is abundant in rocks in the form of water. The NMR signal amplitude is proportional to the quantity of hydrogen nuclei present in a formation and can be calibrated to give a value for porosity that is free from lithology effects. Uniquely, a petrophysicist can also analyse the rate of decay of the NMR signal amplitude to obtain information on the permeability of the formation - a crucial quantity in hydrocarbon exploration.

== Relationship of NMR signal to pore size ==
The most important mechanism affecting NMR relaxation is grain-surface relaxation. Molecules in fluids are in constant Brownian motion, diffusing about the pore space and bouncing off the grain surfaces. Upon interaction with the grain surface, hydrogen protons can transfer some nuclear spin energy to the grain (contributing to T1 relaxation) or irreversibley dephase (contributing to T2 relaxation). Therefore the speed of relaxation most significantly depends on how often the hydrogen nuclei collide with the grain surface and this is controlled by the surface-to-volume ratio of the pore in which the nuclei are located. Collisions are less frequent in larger pores, resulting in a slower decay of the NMR signal amplitude and allowing a petrophysicist to understand the distribution of pore sizes.

== See also ==
- Nuclear magnetic resonance
- Nuclear magnetic resonance in porous media
- Logging while drilling
- SNMR
