= Logging while drilling =

Procedure used on oil wells

Logging while drilling (LWD) is a technique that allows log data to be acquired during drilling operations through tools placed in the bottom hole assembly (BHA). LWD technology was developed originally as an enhancement to the earlier measurement while drilling (MWD) technology to completely or partially replace wireline logging operation. With the improvement of the technology in the past decades, LWD is now widely used for drilling (including geosteering), and formation evaluation.

== Description ==
Logging while drilling (LWD) is a technique that allows log data to be acquired during drilling operations through tools placed in the bottom hole assembly (BHA). It is in contrast to wireline logging, where logs are taken between drilling episodes (trips) and at the end of drilling.

LWD, while sometimes risky and expensive, has the advantage of measuring properties of a formation before drilling fluids invade deeply. Further, many wellbores prove to be difficult or even impossible to measure with conventional wireline tools, especially highly deviated wells. In these situations, the LWD measurement ensures that some measurement of the subsurface is captured in the event that wireline operations are not possible. Timely LWD data can also be used to guide well placement so that the wellbore remains within the zone of interest or in the most productive portion of a reservoir, such as in highly variable shale reservoirs.

== Terminology ==
Although the terms measurement while drilling (MWD) and LWD are related, within the context of this article, the term MWD refers to directional-drilling measurements, e.g., for decision support for the smooth operation of the drilling, while LWD refers to measurements concerning the geological formation made while drilling. LWD tools work with its measurement while drilling (MWD) system to transmit partial or complete measurement results to the surface via typically a drilling mud pulser or other improved techniques, while LWD tools are still in the borehole, which is called "real-time data". Complete measurement results can be downloaded from LWD tools after they are pulled out of hole, which is called "memory data".

== History ==
LWD technology was developed originally as an enhancement to the earlier MWD technology to completely or partially replace wireline logging operation. Initial attempts to provide M/LWD date back to the 1920s, and attempts were made prior to WW2 with Mud Pulse, Wired Pipe, Acoustic and Electromagnetics. JJ Arps produced a working directional and resistivity system in the 1960s. Competing work supported by Mobil, Standard Oil and others in the late 1960s and early 1970s lead to multiple viable systems by the early 1970s, with the MWD of Teleco Industries, systems from Schlumberger (Mobil) Halliburton and BakerHughes. However, the main impetus to development was a decision by the Norwegian Petroleum Directorate to mandate the taking of a directional survey in wells offshore Norway every 100 meters. (Norsok D-010, 5.7.4.2 (b)). This decision created an environment where MWD technology had an economic advantage over conventional mechanical TOTCO devices, and lead to rapid developments, including LWD, to add Gamma and Resistivity, by the early 1980s.

== Available LWD measurements ==
LWD technology was originally developed to guarantee at least a basic data set in case high cost exploration wells could not be logged with wireline. Although the aspiration was to partially or completely replace wireline logging, that was not the driver for early deployments, such as in the limited drilling season offshore in the Arctic summer in the early 1980s. Over the years, more of the measurements have been made available in LWD. With the improvement of the technology in the past decades, LWD is now widely used for drilling (including geosteering), and formation evaluation (especially for real time and high angle wells). Certain new measurements are also development in LWD only. The following is an incomplete list of available measurement in LWD technology.

- Natural gamma ray (GR)
  - Total gamma ray
  - Spectral gamma ray
  - Azimuthal gamma ray
  - Gamma ray close to drill bit.
- Density and photoelectric index
- Neutron porosity
- Borehole caliper
  - Ultra sonic azimuthal caliper.
  - Density caliper
- Resistivity (ohm-m)
  - Attenuation and phase-shift resistivities at different transmitter spacings and frequencies.
  - Resistivity at the drill bit.
  - Deep directional resistivities.
- Sonic
  - Compressional slowness (Δtc)
  - Shear slowness (Δts)
- Borehole images
  - Density borehole image
  - Resistivity borehole image
- Formation tester and sampler
  - Formation pressure
  - Formation fluid sample
- Nuclear magnetic resonance (NMR)
- Seismic while drilling (SWD)
  - Drillbit-SWD

== See also ==
- Geosteering
- Measurement while drilling
