= Geosteering =

Technique for optimal borehole placement

Geosteering is the optimal placement of a wellbore based on the results of realtime downhole geological and geophysical logging measurements rather than three-dimensional targets in space. The objective is usually to keep a directional wellbore within a hydrocarbon pay zone defined in terms of its resistivity, density or even biostratigraphy. In mature areas, geosteering may be used to keep a wellbore in a particular reservoir section to minimize gas or water breakthrough and maximize economic production from the well. In the process of drilling a borehole, geosteering is the act of adjusting the borehole position (inclination and azimuth angles) on the fly to reach one or more geological targets. These changes are based on geological information gathered while drilling.

Originally only a projected target would be aimed for with crude directional tools. Now the advent of rotary steerable tools and an ever-increasing arsenal of geophysical tools enables well placement with ever-increasing accuracy. Typically a basic tool configuration will have directional and inclination sensors, along with a gamma ray tool. Other options are neutron density, look ahead seismic, downhole pressure readings et al. Due to the vast volume of data generated, especially by imaging tools, the data transmitted to the surface is a carefully selected fraction of what is available. Data is collected in memory for a data dump when back on the surface with the tool.

== History ==
Geosteering only practically became possible with the advent of deep reading 2 MHz resistivity LWD tools from the major LWD vendors (BakerHughes Reservoir Navigation Tool, SperrySun and Schlumberger) and other tools in the early 1990s, and the forward modeling software from a number of vendors capable of predicting resistivity tool responses for different relative angles and formation resistivities. Prior to this, Gamma ray gave some bed information, but was rarely used to dynamically adjust the well path to the best oil saturation and porosity. The advent of nuclear tools for porosity and azimuthally sensitive gamma and resistivity tools improved the ability to infer whether the wellbore should be steered up or down. The development of the Troll Oilfield by Norsk Hydro (Later Statoil and Equinor) would not have been possible without the ability to precisely geosteer within a 4-meter thick horizon to avoid gas above and water below.

== Description ==
From 2D and 3D models of underground substructures, deviated wells (2D and 3D) are planned in advance to achieve specific goals: exploration, fluids production, fluids injection or technical.

A well plan is a continuous succession of straight and curved lines representing the geometrical figure of the expected well path. A well plan is always projected on vertical and horizontal maps.

While the borehole is being drilled according to the well plan, new geological information is gathered from mud logging, measurement while drilling (MWD) and logging while drilling (LWD). These usually show some differences from what is expected from the model. As the model is continuously updated with new geological information (formation evaluation) and the borehole position (well deviation survey), changes start to appear in the geological substructures and can lead to the well plan being updated to reach the corrected geological targets.

The following data can be used for the geosteering: MWD, LWD, Image logs, 2D and 3D seismic data, and geological models.

== See also ==
- Oil well
- Directional drilling
- Well logging
- Deviation survey
