= Pressure shale =

Pressure shale is shale that has been exposed to high pressures that causes it to fracture, usually into large concave pieces. In mud logging, watching for this type of shale is one method of monitoring for the possibility of drilling into high pressures that might cause a blowout.
