= Estimated pore pressure =

Estimated pore pressure, as used in the oil industry and mud logging, is an approximation of the amount of force that is being exerted into the borehole by fluids or gases within the formation that has been penetrated.

In the oil industry, estimated pore pressure is measured in pounds per square inch (psi), but is converted to equivalent mud weight and measured in pounds per gallon (lb/gal) to more easily determine the amount of mud weight required to prevent the fluid or gas from escaping and causing a blowout or wellbore failure.
