= Mud weight =

Density of drilling fluid

In the oil industry, mud weight is the density of the drilling fluid and is normally measured in pounds per gallon (lb/gal) (ppg) or pound cubic feet (pcf). In the field it is measured using a mud scale or mud balance. Mud can weigh up to 22 or 23 ppg. A gallon of water typically weighs 8.33 pounds.

In conventional drilling fluids, barite is used to increase the density. Although other additives such as halite (salt) or calcium carbonate can also be used. Mud weight can be decreased by dilution or solids control equipment such as an industrial centrifuge, desilter, desander and shale shaker . Mud weight use to control the trapped fluids or gas in the formations by adding a hydro static pressure on them, increasing the mud weight = increasing the hydro static pressure. If the hydro static pressure increased over the formations pressure that will make a fracture in the formation leading to lose the mud to the formation, so adding loss circulation material like gel-flake or wood chips that can refill the gap and stop the mud loss. If the mud loss continues, then the hydro static pressure will decrease and flammable fluids and gas trapped under pressure will start leaking to the surface. This can lead to a potential blowout.
