= Underreamer =

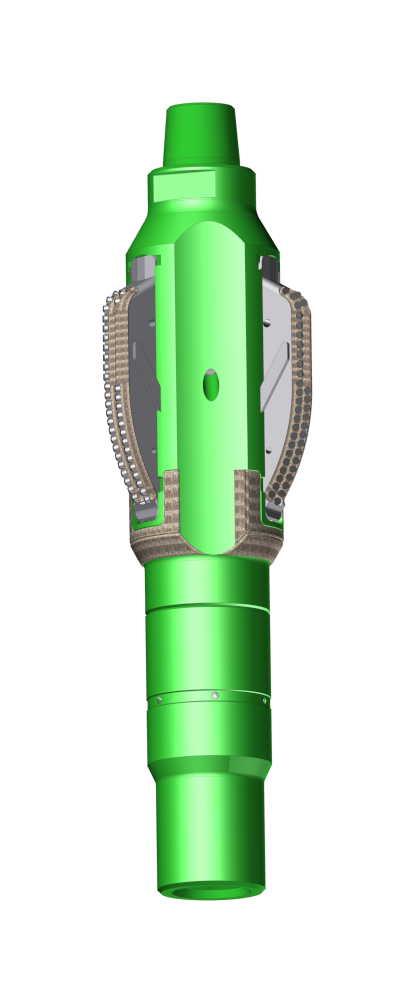
Compact block-type PDC underreamer (Drillstar Z-Reamer)

An underreamer is a device used to enlarge the borehole below an existing casing or restriction, during a well drilling operation. It can be positioned either above the drill bit or above a pilot assembly run inside the existing borehole.

Numerous designs exist, in sizes varying from a couple of inches to above 40". It is typically used in hydrocarbon drilling operations, but also geothermal or water wells drilling.

This device is typically composed of a body connected to the drillstring, and of mobile parts ("arms", "blocks" or "blades", typically 3 of them) retracted in the body during the descent and extended downhole for the reaming operation. Reaming itself can be conducted either in an existing borehole ("pilot reaming") or during the drilling operation ("reaming while drilling").

Underreaming is primarily used to allow a wider clearance for running and cementing the casing correctly, either due to restrictions (swelling shales, tortuosity) or to be able to run a larger casing size. It is commonly used for offshore drilling operations, exploration wells, extended reach drilling or to increase the size of the production liner.

3 primary designs have been developed over the years. In chronological order :
- "Roller-cone" type underreamers, based on roller cone cutters technology, were often plagued by low reliability and limited bottom hole time
- "hinge-and-pin" PDC
- "block-type" PDC, commonly used today, suitable for reaming-while-drilling operations.

Underreamers are also required for directional casing-while-drilling (or "drilling with casing") services, to allow the directional BHA to be retrieved through the casing, either at the end of drilling, or when a change of equipment is needed.

== See also ==
- Drilling rig
- Driller (oil)
- Hole opener
- Drill bit
- Drilling stabilizer
