= Mud balance =

A mud balance, also known as a mud scale, is a device used to measure the density (weight) of drilling fluid, cement or any type of liquid or slurry.

== Description and operation ==
It consists of a graduated beam with a bubble level and a weight slider along its length and a cup with a lid on one end. The cup is used to hold a fixed amount of fluid so it can be weighed. A slider-weight can be moved along the beam, and a bubble indicates when the beam is level. Density is read at the point where the slider-weight sits on the beam at level.

Calibration is done using a liquid of known density (often fresh water) by adjusting the counter weight. Typical balances are not pressurized, but a pressurized mud balance operates in the same manner.

== Reason for use ==
There is no reliable visual method of determining the density of drilling mud; the mud balance is the most reliable and simple way of making the determination.
