= Expandable tubular technology =

Expandable tubular technology is a system for increasing the diameter of the casing or liner of an oil well by up to 30% after it has been run down-hole.

== Telescoping well design ==
During the planning stages, one of the primary considerations that the well engineer takes into account is the density (or "weight") of the drilling fluid. It must be heavy enough to suppress the pressure in exposed permeable formations (thus avoiding a blowout), and yet light enough to avoid breaking down the rock itself. Both parameters generally increase with depth, and create a window in which the drilling fluid density is safe. The mud density required to suppress fluid pressures at, say, 9000' would usually break down the formation further up the well at, say, 1000'. Therefore, the well is drilled in sections by running casing strings to cover depth ranges between which the required mud densities are suitable for that entire range. Each bit must be smaller than the previous casing string, which in turn must be smaller than the previous hole.

This requirement of well design creates a well where each hole section is ever-decreasing in diameter. The only conventional way to combat this effect is to start with an enormous hole at the top (sometimes 30") in order to run as many as five casing strings and still end up with a 6" hole in the targeted reservoir. And this well design leaves little room for error: if the drillers are forced to run yet another casing string on account of unexpected formation pressures or hole conditions, then the target formation may be impossible to reach. Thus there is much to favor a casing system that loses minimal - or possibly no - diameter while still isolating a whole section. Many systems under development have the aim of producing a monobore well, that is, a well with a single diameter from top to bottom.

== Technology ==
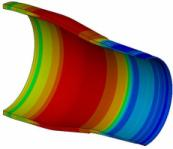
Image of Expanded Tubular FE Analysis

To reduce the loss of diameter each time a new casing string or liner is set, a cold working process has been developed whereby the casing or liner can be expanded by up to 20% in diameter after being run down-hole.

For this purpose, an expansion tool that exceeds the inner diameter of the tube by the required amount of expansion is forced through the pipe. This is done either hydraulically, by applying mud pressure, or mechanically, by pulling the conical/tapered expansion tool. The expansion needs to be reliable, when expanding several thousand feet below the surface. This can be from 30 to 6,000 ft in length.

Carey Naquin was responsible for the first commercial application of expandable tubular technology.

== Applications ==
The applications can be grouped into two main categories – Cased hole and Open hole. Cased hole work is mainly down during the work over or completion phase of a well. The open hole products are used during the drilling period of a well.

The products developed and available today in cased hole work are the expandable liner hanger and the cased hole clad. The expandable liner hanger is basically an evolution of existing equipment currently used in the oil industry, a product with better thru bore and envisaged higher reliability. The Case hole clad provide a casing patch across a damaged section of casing, or to close off previously perforated casing. This product has two main advantages – minimal through bore loss [basically two times the wall thickness of tubular being expanded] and high pressure integrity performance.

Open hole applications is where expandable technology brings real advantages to the operator. Currently the products available are open hole liner and open hole clads.

== See also ==
- Deformation
- William Fairbairn
- Oil field
