= Caliper log =

Well logging tool

A caliper log is a well logging tool that provides a continuous measurement of the size and shape of a borehole along its depth and is commonly used in hydrocarbon exploration. The measurements that are recorded can be an important indicator of wash-outs, cave ins or shale swelling in the borehole, which can affect the results of other well logs.

== Process ==
The caliper tool measures the variation in borehole diameter as it is withdrawn from the bottom of the hole, using two or more articulated arms that push against the borehole wall. Each arm is typically connected to a potentiometer which causes the resistance to change as the diameter of the borehole changes, creating a varying electrical signal that represents the changing shape of the borehole. This variation in output is translated into changes of diameter after a simple calibration and the caliper log is printed as a continuous series of values of hole diameter with depth.

Caliper logs may also be created from both acoustic and electrical borehole image logging. Electrical borehole imaging logs are typical created with 4, 6, or 8 armed tools, which can also be used to create a caliper log. Acoustic borehole imaging tools can create the most accurate and detailed caliper logs, using the pulse echo transit times with an independent acoustic measurement of the borehole drilling fluid velocity, but the range of this type of measurement is often limited by the high acoustic attenuation of the drilling fluid.

The decentralization arm typically present on a density logging tool may also be used to create a crude caliper log, which is limited along a single, high-side axis.

== Accuracy ==
Known challenges with caliper logging include borehole spiralling. The position of the drill bit may precess as it drills, leading to spiraling shapes in the wellbore wall, as if the hole had been drilled by a screw. If the arms of the caliper log follow the grooves of the spiral, it will report too high an average diameter. Moving in and out of the grooves, the caliper will give erratic or periodically varying readings.

The borehole can also change to an oval shape while drilling, which typically occurs in doglegs where the axis of borehole is bending to change the direction of the well. This oval shape can cause a 2-arm caliper log to overestimate the size of the borehole, if its arms get stuck in the long-axis.

In most cases, the borehole's circumference will not be a perfect circle and therefore a caliper tool with several arms is required to obtain a true understanding of the size and shape of the borehole. The current state of the art is six independent mechanical arms that simultaneous record the radial distance from the center of the tool. Abrupt changes in borehole diameter, such as a washout at the bottom of casing, or thin fractures may not be accurately measured due to the geometry or range of the measurement arms.
