= Weight on bit =

Weight on bit (WOB), as expressed in the oil industry, is the amount of downward force exerted on the drill bit and is normally measured in thousands of pounds.

Weight on bit is provided by drill collars, which are thick-walled tubular pieces machined from solid bars of steel, usually plain carbon steel but sometimes of nonmagnetic nickel-copper alloy or other nonmagnetic premium alloys. Gravity acts on the large mass of the collars to provide the downward force needed for the bits to efficiently break rock. To accurately control the amount of force applied to the bit, the driller carefully monitors the surface weight measured while the bit is just off the bottom of the wellbore. Next, the drillstring (and the drill bit), is slowly and carefully lowered until it touches bottom. After that point, as the driller continues to lower the top of the drillstring, more and more weight is applied to the bit, and correspondingly less weight is measured as hanging at the surface. If the surface measurement shows 20,000 pounds [9080 kg] less weight than with the bit off bottom, then there should be 20,000 pounds force on the bit (in a vertical hole). Some downhole Measurement While Drilling (MWD) sensors can measure weight-on-bit more accurately and transmit the data to the surface.
