= Formation evaluation =

Production assessment of boreholes drilled for oil or gas

Formation evaluation in petroleum engineering is the process of assessing subsurface rock formations to determine their ability to produce oil and gas. It helps identify hydrocarbon-bearing zones, understand reservoir properties, and make decisions about well completion, production, and reservoir management.

== Use ==
In petroleum exploration and development, formation evaluation is used to determine the ability of a borehole to produce petroleum. Essentially, it is the process of recognizing a commercial well while drilling one.

Modern rotary drilling usually uses a heavy mud as a lubricant and as a means of producing a confining pressure against the formation face in the borehole, preventing blowouts. Only in rare and catastrophic cases, do oil and gas wells come in with a fountain of gushing oil. In real life, that is a blowout—and usually also a financial and environmental disaster. But controlling blowouts has drawbacks—mud filtrate soaks into the formation around the borehole and a mud cake plasters the sides of the hole. These factors obscure the possible presence of oil or gas in even very porous formations. Further complicating the problem is the widespread occurrence of small amounts of petroleum in the rocks of many sedimentary provinces. In fact, if a sedimentary province is absolutely barren of traces of petroleum, it is not feasible to continue drilling there.

The formation evaluation problem is a matter of answering two questions:

1. What are the lower limits for porosity, permeability and upper limits for water saturation that permit profitable production from a particular formation or pay zone; in a particular geographic area; in a particular economic climate.
2. Do any of the formations in the well under consideration exceed these lower limits.

It is complicated by the impossibility of directly examining the formation. It is, in short, the problem of looking at the formation indirectly.

Until the late 1950s electric logs, mud logs and sample logs comprised most of the oilman's armamentarium. Logging tools to measure porosity and permeability began to be used at that time. The first was the microlog. This was a miniature electric log with two sets of electrodes. One measured the formation resistivity about 1/2 in (13 mm) deep and the other about 1–2 in (25–51 mm) deep. The purpose of this seemingly pointless measurement was to detect permeability. Permeable sections of a borehole wall develop a thick layer of mudcake during drilling. Mud liquids, called filtrate, soak into the formation, leaving the mud solids behind to -ideally- seal the wall and stop the filtrate invasion or soaking. The short depth electrode of the microlog sees mudcake in permeable sections. The deeper 1 in (25 mm) electrode sees filtrate invaded formation. In nonpermeable sections both tools read alike and the traces fall on top of each other on the stripchart log. In permeable sections, they separate.

== Formation evaluation tools ==
Formation evaluation tools are specialized instruments used during drilling or after drilling to measure physical properties of subsurface formations. These tools help identify hydrocarbon-bearing zones, estimate reservoir quality, and guide production decisions.

=== Well cuttings examination ===
Tools to detect oil and gas have been evolving for over a century. The simplest and most direct tool is well cuttings examination. Some older oilmen ground the cuttings between their teeth and tasted to see if crude oil was present. Today, a wellsite geologist or mudlogger uses a low powered stereoscopic microscope to determine the lithology of the formation being drilled and to estimate porosity and possible oil staining. A portable ultraviolet light chamber or spook box is used to examine the cuttings for fluorescence. Fluorescence can be an indication of crude oil staining, or of the presence of fluorescent minerals. They can be differentiated by placing the cuttings in a solvent filled watchglass or dimple dish. The solvent is usually carbon tetrachlorethane. Crude oil dissolves and then redeposits as a fluorescent ring when the solvent evaporates. The written strip chart recording of these examinations is called a sample log or mudlog.

Well cuttings examination is a learned skill. During drilling, chips of rock, usually less than about 1/8 inch (3.2 mm) across, are cut from the bottom of the hole by the bit. Mud, jetting out of holes in the bit under high pressure, washes the cuttings away and up the hole. During their trip to the surface they may circulate around the turning drillpipe, mix with cuttings falling back down the hole, mix with fragments caving from the hole walls and mix with cuttings travelling faster and slower in the same upward direction. They then are screened out of the mudstream by the shale shaker and fall on a pile at its base. Determining the type of rock being drilled at any one time is a matter of knowing the 'lag time' between a chip being cut by the bit and the time it reaches the surface where it is then examined by the wellsite geologist (or mudlogger as they are sometimes called). A sample of the cuttings taken at the proper time will contain the current cuttings in a mixture of previously drilled material. Recognizing them can be very difficult at times, for example after a bit trip, when a couple of miles of drill pipe has been extracted and returned to the hole in order to replace a dull bit. At such a time, there is a flood of foreign material knocked from the borehole walls (cavings), making the mudloggers task all the more difficult.

=== Coring ===
Coring is the process of retrieving cylindrical rock samples (cores) from the subsurface during drilling operations. These samples provide direct physical evidence of the reservoir rock and are used to study its petrophysical, geological, and mechanical properties.

One way to get more detailed samples of a formation is by coring. Two techniques commonly used at present. The first is the whole core, a cylinder of rock, usually about 3 to 4 in (76 to 102 mm) in diameter and up to 50 to 60 feet (15 to 18 m) long. It is cut with a core barrel, a hollow pipe tipped with a ring-shaped diamond chip-studded bit that can cut a plug and bring it to the surface. Often the plug breaks while drilling, usually in shales or fractures and the core barrel jams, slowly grinding the rocks in front of it to powder. This signals the driller to give up on getting a full-length core and to pull up the pipe.

Taking a full core is an expensive operation that usually stops or slows drilling for at least the better part of a day. A full core can be invaluable for later reservoir evaluation. Once a section of well has been drilled, there is, of course, no way to core it without drilling another well.

Another, cheaper, technique for obtaining samples of the formation is sidewall coring. One type of sidewall cores is percussion cores. In this method, a steel cylinder—a coring gun—has hollow-point steel bullets mounted along its sides and moored to the gun by short steel cables. The coring gun is lowered to the bottom of the interval of interest and the bullets are fired individually as the gun is pulled up the hole. The mooring cables ideally pull the hollow bullets and the enclosed plug of formation loose and the gun carries them to the surface. Advantages of this technique are low cost and the ability to sample the formation after it has been drilled. Disadvantages are possible non-recovery because of lost or misfired bullets and a slight uncertainty about the sample depth. Sidewall cores are often shot on the run without stopping at each core point because of the danger of differential sticking. Most service company personnel are skilled enough to minimize this problem, but it can be significant if depth accuracy is important.

A second method of sidewall coring is rotary sidewall cores. In this method, a circular-saw assembly is lowered to the zone of interest on a wireline, and the core is sawed out. Dozens of cores may be taken this way in one run. This method is roughly 20 times as expensive as percussion cores, but yields a much better sample.

A serious problem with cores is the change they undergo as they are brought to the surface. It might seem that cuttings and cores are very direct samples but the problem is whether the formation at depth will produce oil or gas. Sidewall cores are deformed and compacted and fractured by the bullet impact. Most full cores from any significant depth expand and fracture as they are brought to the surface and removed from the core barrel. Both types of core can be invaded or even flushed by mud, making the evaluation of formation fluids difficult. The formation analyst has to remember that all tools give indirect data.

=== Mud logging ===
Mud logging (or wellsite geology) is a well logging process in which drilling mud and drill bit cuttings from the formation are evaluated during drilling and their properties recorded on a strip chart as a visual analytical tool and stratigraphic cross sectional representation of the well. The drilling mud which is analyzed for hydrocarbon gases, by use of a gas chromatograph, contains drill bit cuttings which are visually evaluated by a mudlogger and then described in the mud log. The total gas, chromatograph record, lithological sample, pore pressure, shale density, D-exponent, etc. (all lagged parameters because they are circulated up to the surface from the bit) are plotted along with surface parameters such as rate of penetration (ROP), Weight On Bit (WOB), rotation per minute etc. on the mudlog which serve as a tool for the mudlogger, drilling engineers, mud engineers, and other service personnel charged with drilling and producing the well.

=== Wireline logging ===
The oil and gas industry uses wireline logging to obtain a continuous record of a formation's rock properties. Wireline logging can be defined as being "The acquisition and analysis of geophysical data performed as a function of well bore depth, together with the provision of related services." Note that wireline logging and mud logging are not the same, yet are closely linked through the integration of the data sets. The measurements are made referenced to True Along Hole depth (TAH). These and the associated analysis can then be used to infer further properties, such as hydrocarbon saturation and formation pressure, and to make further drilling and production decisions.

Wireline logging is performed by lowering a logging tool—or a string of one or more instruments—on the end of a wireline into an oil well (or borehole) and recording petrophysical properties using a variety of sensors. Logging tools developed over the years measure the natural gamma ray, electrical, acoustic, stimulated radioactive responses, electromagnetic, nuclear magnetic resonance, pressure and other properties of the rocks and their contained fluids. For this article, they are broadly broken down by the main property that they respond to.

The data itself is recorded either at surface (real-time mode), or in the hole (memory mode) to an electronic data format and then either a printed record or electronic presentation called a well log is provided to the client, along with an electronic copy of the raw data. Well logging operations can either be performed during the drilling process, to provide real-time information about the formations being penetrated by the borehole, or once the well has reached Total Depth and the whole depth of the borehole can be logged.

Real-time data is recorded directly against measured cable depth. Memory data is recorded against time, and then depth data is simultaneously measured against time. The two data sets are then merged using the common time base to create an instrument response versus depth log. Memory recorded depth can also be corrected in exactly the same way as real-time corrections are made, so there should be no difference in the attainable TAH accuracy.

The measured cable depth can be derived from a number of different measurements, but is usually either recorded based on a calibrated wheel counter, or (more accurately) using magnetic marks which provide calibrated increments of cable length. The measurements made must then be corrected for elastic stretch and temperature.

There are many types of wireline logs and they can be categorized either by their function or by the technology that they use. Open hole logs are run before the oil or gas well is lined with pipe or cased. Cased hole logs are run after the well is lined with casing or production pipe.

Wireline logs can be divided into broad categories based on the physical properties measured.

=== Electric logs ===
In 1928, the Schlumberger brothers in France developed the workhorse of all formation evaluation tools: the electric log. Electric logs have been improved to a high degree of precision and sophistication since that time, but the basic principle has not changed. Most underground formations contain water, often salt water, in their pores. The resistance to electric current of the total formation—rock and fluids—around the borehole is proportional to the sum of the volumetric proportions of mineral grains and conductive water-filled pore space. If the pores are partially filled with gas or oil, which are resistant to the passage of electric current, the bulk formation resistance is higher than for water filled pores. For the sake of a convenient comparison from measurement to measurement, the electrical logging tools measure the resistance of a cubic meter of formation. This measurement is called resistivity.

Modern resistivity logging tools fall into two categories, Laterolog and Induction, with various commercial names depending on the company providing the logging services.

==== Laterlog tools ====
Laterolog tools send an electric current from an electrode on the sonde directly into the formation. The return electrodes are located either on surface or on the sonde itself. Complex arrays of electrodes on the sonde (guard electrodes) focus the current into the formation and prevent current lines from fanning out or flowing directly to the return electrode through the borehole fluid. Most tools vary the voltage at the main electrode in order to maintain a constant current intensity. This voltage is therefore proportional to the resistivity of the formation. Because current must flow from the sonde to the formation, these tools only work with conductive borehole fluid. Actually, since the resistivity of the mud is measured in series with the resistivity of the formation, laterolog tools give best results when mud resistivity is low with respect to formation resistivity, i.e., in salty mud.

==== Induction logs ====
Induction logs use an electric coil in the sonde to generate an alternating current loop in the formation by induction. This is the same physical principle as is used in electric transformers. The alternating current loop, in turn, induces a current in a receiving coil located elsewhere on the sonde. The amount of current in the receiving coil is proportional to the intensity of current loop, hence to the conductivity (reciprocal of resistivity) of the formation. Multiple transmitting and receiving coils are used to focus formation current loops both radially (depth of investigation) and axially (vertical resolution). Until the late 80's, the workhorse of induction logging has been the 6FF40 sonde which is made up of six coils with a nominal spacing of 40 inches (1,000 mm).

Since the 90's, all major logging companies use so-called array induction tools. These comprise a single transmitting coil and a large number of receiving coils. Radial and axial focusing is performed by software rather than by the physical layout of coils. Since the formation current flows in circular loops around the logging tool, mud resistivity is measured in parallel with formation resistivity. Induction tools therefore give best results when mud resistivity is high with respect to formation resistivity, i.e., fresh mud or non-conductive fluid. In oil-base mud, which is non conductive, induction logging is the only option available.

=== Porosity logs ===
In the late 1950s porosity measuring logs were being developed; the two main types are: nuclear porosity logs and sonic logs. The two main nuclear porosity logs are the density log and the neutron log.

==== Nuclear porosity logs ====
Density logging tools contain a caesium-137 gamma ray source which irradiates the formation with 662 keV gamma rays. These gamma rays interact with electrons in the formation through Compton scattering and lose energy. Once the energy of the gamma ray has fallen below 100 keV, photoelectric absorption dominates: gamma rays are eventually absorbed by the formation. The amount of energy loss by Compton scattering is related to the number electrons per unit volume of formation. Since for most elements of interest (below Z = 20) the ratio of atomic weight, A, to atomic number, Z, is close to 2, gamma ray energy loss is related to the amount of matter per unit volume, i.e., formation density.

A gamma ray detector located some distance from the source, detects surviving gamma rays and sorts them into several energy windows. The number of high-energy gamma rays is controlled by Compton scattering, hence by formation density. The number of low-energy gamma rays is controlled by photoelectric absorption, which is directly related to the average atomic number, Z, of the formation, hence to lithology. Modern density logging tools include two or three detectors, which allow compensation for some borehole effects, in particular for the presence of mud cake between the tool and the formation.

Since there is a large contrast between the density of the minerals in the formation and the density of pore fluids, porosity can easily be derived from measured formation bulk density if both mineral and fluid densities are known.

Neutron porosity logging tools contain an americium-beryllium neutron source, which irradiates the formation with neutrons. These neutrons lose energy through elastic collisions with nuclei in the formation. Once their energy has decreased to thermal level, they diffuse randomly away from the source and are ultimately absorbed by a nucleus. Hydrogen atoms have essentially the same mass as the neutron; therefore hydrogen is the main contributor to the slowing down of neutrons. A detector at some distance from the source records the number of neutron reaching this point. Neutrons that have been slowed down to thermal level have a high probability of being absorbed by the formation before reaching the detector. The neutron counting rate is therefore inversely related to the amount of hydrogen in the formation. Since hydrogen is mostly present in pore fluids (water, hydrocarbons) the count rate can be converted into apparent porosity. Modern neutron logging tools usually include two detectors to compensate for some borehole effects. Porosity is derived from the ratio of count rates at these two detectors rather than from count rates at a single detector.

The combination of neutron and density logs takes advantage of the fact that lithology has opposite effects on these two porosity measurements. The average of neutron and density porosity values is usually close to the true porosity, regardless of lithology. Another advantage of this combination is the gas effect. Gas, being less dense than liquids, translates into a density-derived porosity that is too high. Gas, on the other hand, has much less hydrogen per unit volume than liquids: neutron-derived porosity, which is based on the amount of hydrogen, is too low. If both logs are displayed on compatible scales, they overlay each other in liquid-filled clean formations and are widely separated in gas-filled formations.

==== Sonic logs ====
Sonic logs use a pinger and microphone arrangement to measure the velocity of sound in the formation from one end of the sonde to the other. For a given type of rock, acoustic velocity varies indirectly with porosity. If the velocity of sound through solid rock is taken as a measurement of 0% porosity, a slower velocity is an indication of a higher porosity that is usually filled with formation water with a slower sonic velocity.

==== Comparison on porosity logs ====
Both sonic and density-neutron logs give porosity as their primary information. Sonic logs read farther away from the borehole so they are more useful where sections of the borehole are caved. Because they read deeper, they also tend to average more formation than the density-neutron logs do. Modern sonic configurations with pingers and microphones at both ends of the log, combined with computer analysis, minimize the averaging somewhat. Averaging is an advantage when the formation is being evaluated for seismic parameters, a different area of formation evaluation. A special log, the Long Spaced Sonic, is sometimes used for this purpose. Seismic signals (a single undulation of a sound wave in the earth) average together tens to hundreds of feet of formation, so an averaged sonic log is more directly comparable to a seismic waveform.

Density-neutron logs read the formation within about four–seven inches (100–180 mm) of the borehole wall. This is an advantage in resolving thin beds. It is a disadvantage when the hole is badly caved. Corrections can be made automatically if the cave is no more than a few inches deep. A caliper arm on the sonde measures the profile of the borehole and a correction is calculated and incorporated in the porosity reading. However, if the cave is much more than four inches deep, the density-neutron log is reading little more than drilling mud.

=== Lithology logs - SP and gamma ray ===
Two other tools are the SP log and the gamma ray log. One or both are almost always used in wireline logging. Their output is usually presented along with the electric and porosity logs described above. They are indispensable as additional guides to the nature of the rock around the borehole.

==== SP log ====
The SP log, known variously as a spontaneous potential, self potential, or shale potential log, is a voltmeter measurement of the voltage or electrical potential difference between the mud in the hole at a particular depth and a copper ground stake driven into the surface of the earth a short distance from the borehole. A salinity difference between the drilling mud and the formation water acts as a natural battery and will cause several voltage effects. This battery causes a movement of charged ions between the hole and the formation water where there is enough permeability in the rock. The most important voltage is set up as a permeable formation permits ion movement, reducing the voltage between the formation water and the mud. Sections of the borehole where this occurs then have a voltage difference with other nonpermeable sections where ion movement is restricted. Vertical ion movement in the mud column occurs much more slowly because the mud is not circulating while the drill pipe is out of the hole. The copper surface stake provides a reference point against which the SP voltage is measured for each part of the borehole. There can also be several other minor voltages, due for example to mud filtrate streaming into the formation under the effect of an overbalanced mud system. This flow carries ions and is a voltage generating current. These other voltages are secondary in importance to the voltage resulting from the salinity contrast between mud and formation water.

The nuances of the SP log are still being researched. In theory, almost all porous rocks contain water. Some pores are completely filled with water. Others have a thin layer of water molecules wetting the surface of the rock, with gas or oil filling the rest of the pore. In sandstones and porous limestones, there is a continuous layer of water throughout the formation. If there is even a little permeability to water, ions can move through the rock and decrease the voltage difference with the mud nearby. Shales do not allow water or ion movement. Although they may have a large water content, it is bound to the surface of the flat clay crystals comprising the shale. Thus, mud opposite shale sections maintains its voltage difference with the surrounding rock.

As the SP logging tool is drawn up the hole it measures the voltage difference between the reference stake and the mud opposite shale and sandstone or limestone sections. The resulting log curve reflects the permeability of the rocks and, indirectly, their lithology. SP curves degrade over time, as the ions diffuse up and down the mud column. It also can suffer from stray voltages caused by other logging tools that are run with it. Older, simpler logs often have better SP curves than more modern logs for this reason. With experience in an area, a good SP curve can even allow a skilled interpreter to infer sedimentary environments such as deltas, point bars or offshore tidal deposits.

==== Gamma ray log ====
The gamma ray log is a measurement of naturally occurring gamma radiation from the borehole walls. Sandstones are usually nonradioactive quartz and limestones are nonradioactive calcite. Shales however, are naturally radioactive due to potassium isotopes in clays, and adsorbed uranium and thorium. Thus, the presence or absence of gamma rays in a borehole is an indication of the amount of shale or clay in the surrounding formation. The gamma ray log is useful in holes drilled with air or with oil based muds, as these wells have no SP voltage. Even in water-based muds, the gamma ray and SP logs are often run together. They comprise a check on each other and can indicate unusual shale sections which may either not be radioactive, or may have an abnormal ionic chemistry. The gamma ray log is also useful to detect coal beds, which, depending on the local geology, can have either low radiation levels, or high radiation levels due to adsorption of uranium. In addition, the gamma ray log will work inside a steel casing, making it essential when a cased well must be evaluated.

== Interpreting the tools ==
The immediate questions that have to be answered in deciding to complete a well or to plug and abandon (P&A) it are:

- Do any zones in the well contain producible hydrocarbons?
- How much?
- How much, if any, water will be produced with them?

The elementary approach to answering these questions uses the Archie Equation.
