= Rate of penetration =

In the drilling industry, the rate of penetration (ROP), also known as penetration rate or drill rate, is the speed at which a drill bit breaks the rock under it to deepen the borehole. It is normally measured in feet per minute or meters per hour, but sometimes it is expressed in minutes per foot.

Generally, ROP increases in fast drilling formation such as sandstone (positive drill break) and decreases in slow drilling formations such as shale (reverse break). ROP decreases in shale due to diagenesis and overburden stresses. Over pressured zones can give twice of ROP as expected which is an indicative of a well kick. Drillers need to stop and do the bottoms up.

== See also ==
- Drilling rig

== External resources ==
- Rate of penetration
