= List of components of oil drilling rigs =

This article lists the main components of a petroleum onshore drilling rig.

Offshore drilling rigs have similar elements, but are configured with a number of different drilling systems to suit drilling in the marine environment.

The equipment associated with a rig is to some extent dependent on the type of rig but typically includes at least some of the items listed below.

== List of items ==
Simple diagram of a drilling rig and its basic operation

1. Mud tank
2. Shale shakers
3. Suction line (mud pump)
4. Mud pump
5. Motor or power source
6. Hose
7. Drawworks
8. Standpipe
9. Kelly hose
10. Goose-neck
11. Traveling block
12. Drill line
13. Crown block
14. Derrick
15. Racking Board (Sometimes referred to as the Monkey Board)
16. Stand (of drill pipe)
17. Setback (floor)
18. Swivel (On newer rigs this may be replaced by a top drive)
19. Kelly drive
20. Rotary table
21. Drill floor
22. Bell nipple
23. Blowout preventer (BOP) Annular type
24. Blowout preventer (BOP) Pipe ram & blind ram
25. Drill string
26. Drill bit
27. Casing head or Wellhead
28. Flow line

== Explanation ==
- Bell nipple (#22) is a section of large diameter pipe fitted to the top of the blowout preventers that the flow line attaches to via a side outlet, to allow the drilling mud to flow back to the mud tanks.
- Blowout preventers (BOPs) (#23 and #24) are devices installed at the wellhead to prevent fluids and gases from unintentionally escaping from the wellbore. #23 is the annular (often referred to as Hydril named after a manufacturer), and #24 is the pipe rams and blind rams.
- Casing head (#27) is a large metal flange welded or screwed onto the top of the conductor pipe (also known as drive-pipe) or the casing and is used to bolt the surface equipment such as the blowout preventers (for well drilling) or the Christmas tree (oil well) (for well production).
- Centrifuge (not pictured) is an industrial version of the device that separates fine silt and sand from the drilling fluid. It is typically mounted on top or just off of the mud tanks.
- Crown block (#13) is the stationary end of the block and tackle.
- Degasser (not pictured) is a device that separates air and/or gas from the drilling fluid. It is typically mounted on top of the mud tanks.
- Derrick (#14) is the support structure for the equipment used to lower and raise the drill string into and out of the wellbore. This consists of the sub-structure (structure below the drill floor level) and the mast.
- Desander / desilter (not pictured) contains a set of hydrocyclones that separate sand and silt from the drilling fluid. Typically mounted on top of the mud tanks.
- Drawworks (#7) is the mechanical section that contains the spool, whose main function is to reel in/out the drill line to raise/lower the traveling block.
- Drill bit (#26) is a device attached to the end of the drill string that breaks apart the rock being drilled. It contains jets through which the drilling fluid exits.
- Drill floor (#21) is the area on the rig where the tools are located to make the connections of the drill pipe, bottom hole assembly, tools and bit. It is considered the main area where work is performed.
- Drill line (#12) is thick, stranded metal cable threaded through the two blocks (traveling and crown) to raise and lower the drill string.
- Drill pipe (#16) is a joint of hollow tubing used to connect the surface equipment to the bottom hole assembly (BHA) and acts as a conduit for the drilling fluid. In the diagram, these are stands of drill pipe which are 2 or 3 joints of drill pipe connected and stood in the derrick vertically, usually to save time while tripping pipe.
- Drill string (#25) is an assembled collection of drill pipe, heavy weight drill pipe, drill collars and any of a whole assortment of tools, connected and run into the wellbore to facilitate the drilling of a well. The collection is referred to singularly as the drill string.
- Elevators (not pictured) are hinged devices that is used to latch to the drill pipe or casing to facilitate the lowering or lifting (of pipe or casing) into or out of the wellbore.
- Flow line (#28) is large diameter pipe that is attached to the bell nipple and extends to the shale shakers to facilitate the flow of drilling fluid back to the mud tanks.
- Goose-neck (#10) is a thick metal elbow connected to the swivel and standpipe that supports the weight of and provides a downward angle for the kelly hose to hang from.
- Kelly drive (#19) is a square, hexagonal or octagonal shaped tubing that is inserted through and is an integral part of the rotary table that moves freely vertically while the rotary table turns it.
- Kelly hose (#9) is a flexible, high pressure hose that connects the standpipe to the kelly (or more specifically to the gooseneck on the swivel above the kelly) and allows free vertical movement of the kelly, while facilitating the flow of the drilling fluid through the system and down the drill string.
- Racking board (#15) is the catwalk along the side of the derrick (usually about 35 or 40 feet above the "floor"). The monkey board is where the derrick man works while "tripping" pipe.
- Mud motor (not pictured) is a hydraulically powered device positioned just above the drill bit used to spin the bit independently from the rest of the drill string.
- Mud pump (#4) is a reciprocal type of pump used to circulate drilling fluid through the system.
- Mud tank (#1) is often called mud pits and stores drilling fluid until it is required down the wellbore.
- Setback (#17) is a part of the drill floor (#21) where the stands of drill pipe are stood upright. It is typically made of a metal frame structure with large wooden beams situated within it. The wood helps to protect the end of the drill pipe.
- Rotary table (#20) rotates, along with its constituent parts, the kelly and kelly bushing, the drill string and the attached tools and bit.
- Shale shaker (#2) separates drill cuttings from the drilling fluid before it is pumped back down the wellbore.
- Stand (#16) is a section of 2 or 3 joints of drill pipe connected and stood upright in the derrick. When they are pulled out of the hole, instead of laying down each joint of drill pipe, 2 or 3 joints are left connected and stood in the derrick to save time.
- Standpipe (#8) is a thick metal tubing, situated vertically along the derrick, that facilitates the flow of drilling fluid and has attached to it and supports one end of the kelly hose.
- Suction line (#3) is an intake line for the mud pump to draw drilling fluid from the mud tanks.
- Swivel (#18) is the top end of the kelly that allows the rotation of the drill string without twisting the block.
- Traveling block (#11) is the moving end of the block and tackle. Together, they give a significant mechanical advantage for lifting.
- Vibrating hose (#6) is a flexible, high pressure hose (similar to the kelly hose) that connects the mud pump to the stand pipe. It is called the vibrating hose because it tends to vibrate and shake (sometimes violently) due to its close proximity to the mud pumps.

== Bibliography ==
- G. Robello Samuel: Introduction to rotary drilling. (Drilling technology series; Segment 1) Petroleum Extension Service, Division of Continuing and Innovative Education, The University of Texas at Austin, Austin, TX, 2014, ISBN 978-0-88698-259-1.
