= Slips (oil drilling) =

Slips is a device used to grip and hold the upper part of a drill string to the drill floor on an oil rig. The slips are constructed as a collection of metal wedges, hinged together to form a circular shape around the drill pipe. On the inside surface, the slips normally has replaceable steel teeth that grips the pipe. The outsides of the slips are tapered and meets a similar taper on the drill floor. Usually the pipe goes through a Rotary table - machinery that makes the pipe rotate.

After the slips is placed around the drill pipe, it is lowered so that the teeth on the inside grip the pipe and the slips are pulled down. The wedges then holds the drill pipe by the compressive force.

After work is completed, the drill string is raised, thereby unlocking the gripping action. The slips are then lifted away.
