= Squeeze job =

Oilfield cement-slurry injection process

Squeeze job (or squeeze cementing) is a oilfield process of injecting cement slurry into a zone, generally for pressure-isolation purposes.

== Description ==
Squeeze job or squeeze cementing are terms often used in the oilfield to describe the process of injecting cement slurry into a zone, generally for pressure-isolation purposes.

Usually the zone to be squeezed is isolated from above with a packer (and possibly from below with a bridge plug), but sometimes the squeezing pressure is applied to the entire casing string in what is known as a bradenhead squeeze (named for an old manufacturer of casing heads).

== Etymology ==
The term squeeze job probably originated from the concept that enough water is squeezed out of the slurry to render it unflowable, so the portion that has actually entered the zone will stay in place when the squeeze pressure is released. After surface indications (e.g., pressure reaching a predetermined maximum) that a squeeze has been attained, any still-pumpable cement slurry remaining in the drill pipe or tubing ideally can be reverse circulated out before it sets.

The generic term squeeze also can apply to injection of generally small volumes of other liquids (e.g., treating fluids) into a zone under pressure. Bullhead squeeze (or just plain bullheading) refers to pumping kill-weight mud down the casing beneath closed blowout preventers in a kick-control situation when it isn't feasible to circulate in such from bottom.

== Background ==
Even if a drilling rig is on location, pumping operations usually are done by a service company's cementing unit that can easily mix small batches of cement slurry, measure displacement volume accurately to spot the slurry on bottom, then pump at very low rates and high pressures during the squeeze itself, and finally measure volumes accurately again when reversing out any excess slurry. A squeeze manifold is a compact arrangement of valves and pressure gauges that allows monitoring of the drill pipe and casing pressures throughout the job, and facilitates quick switching of the pumping pressure to either side while the fluid returning from the other side of well is directed to the mud pit or a disposal pit or tank.

== See also ==
- Drilling rig (petroleum) — for a diagram of a drilling rig.
