= Drill line =

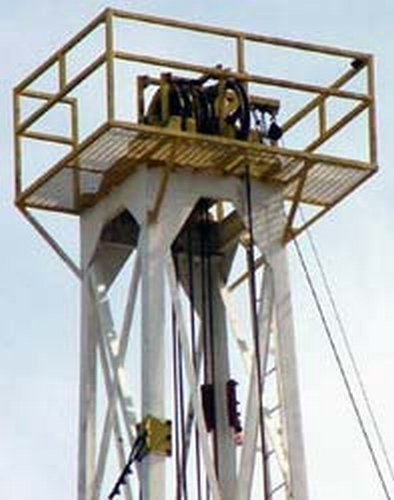

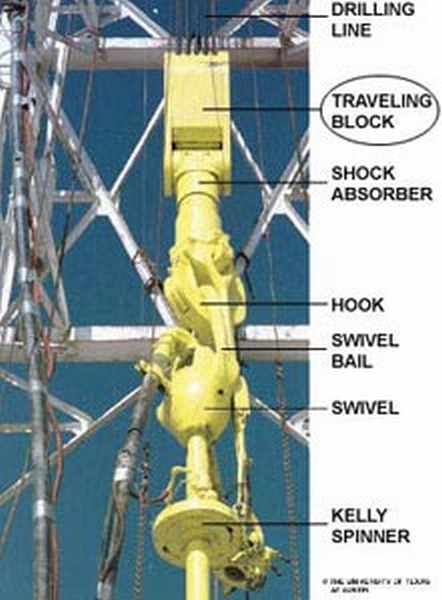

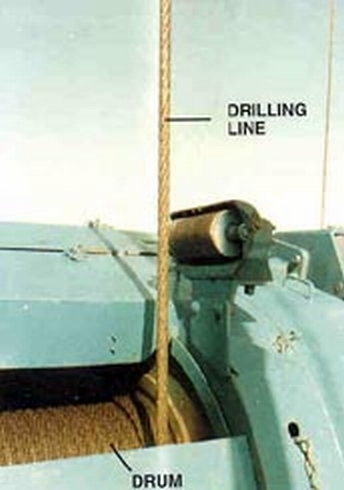

In a drilling rig, the drill line is a multi-thread, twisted wire rope that is threaded or reeved through in typically 6 to 12 parts between the traveling block and crown block to facilitate the lowering and lifting of the drill string into and out of the wellbore.

On larger diameter lines, traveling block loads of over a million pounds are possible.

To make a connection is to add another segment of drill pipe onto the top the drill string. A segment is added by pulling the kelly above the rotary table, stopping the mud pump, hanging off the drill string in the rotary table, unscrewing the kelly from the drill pipe below, swinging the kelly over to permit connecting it to the top of the new segment (which had been placed in the mousehole), and then screwing this assembly into the top of the existing drill string. Mud circulation is resumed, and the drill string is lowered into the hole until the bit takes weight at the bottom of the hole. Drilling then resumes.
