= Top drive =

Mechanical device used to turn a drill string

A top drive is a mechanical device on a drilling rig that provides clockwise torque to the drill string to drill a borehole. It is an alternative to the rotary table and kelly drive. It is located at the swivel's place below the traveling block and moves vertically up and down the derrick.

== Benefits ==
The top drive allows the drilling rig to drill the longer section of a stand of drill pipe in one operation. A rotary table type rig can only drill 30-foot (9.1 m) (single drill pipe) sections of drill pipe whereas a top drive can drill 60–90-foot (18–27 m) stands (double and triple drill pipe respectively, a triple being three joints of drillpipe screwed together), depending on the drilling rig size. Handling longer sections of drill pipe enables a drilling rig to make greater daily progress because up to 90-foot (27 m) can be drilled at a time, thus requiring fewer "connections" to add another 30-foot (9.1 m) of drill pipe. Another advantage of top drive systems is time efficiency. When the bit progresses under a kelly drive, the entire string must be withdrawn from the well bore for the length of the kelly in order to add one more length of drill pipe. With a top drive, the draw works only has to pick up a new stand from the rack and make up two joints. Making fewer and quicker connections reduces the risk of a stuck string from annulus clogging while drilling fluid is not being pumped.

== Variations ==
Several different kinds of top drives exist, and are usually classified based on the "Safe Working Load" (SWL) of the equipment and the size and type of motor used to rotate the drillpipe. For offshore and heavy duty use, a 1000 short ton unit would be used, whereas a smaller land rig may only require a 500 short ton device. Various sizes of hydraulic motors, or AC or DC electric motors, are available.

== Standards ==
The American Petroleum Institute has set standards for top drives in a number of its publications including:

- API 8A: Specification for Drilling and Production Hoisting Equipment (effective May 1998, withdrawn February 2013)
- API 8B: Recommended Practice for Procedures for Inspections, Maintenance, Repair, and Remanufacture of Hoisting Equipment
- API 8C: Specification for Drilling and Production Hoisting Equipment

The International Organization for Standardization publishes a standard relating to top drives in:

- ISO 13535: Recommended Practice for Procedures for Inspections, Maintenance, Repair, and Remanufacture of Hoisting Equipment
