= Drawworks =

A drawworks is the primary hoisting machinery component of a rotary drilling rig. Its main function is to provide a means of raising and lowering the traveling block. The wire-rope drill line winds on the drawworks drum and over the crown block to the traveling block, allowing the drill string to be moved up and down as the drum turns. The segment of drill line from the drawworks to the crown block is called the "fast line". The drill line then enters the first sheave of the crown block and makes typically 6 to 12 passes between the crown block and traveling block pulleys for mechanical advantage. The line then exits the last sheave on the crown block and is fastened to a derrick leg on the other side of the rig floor. This section of drill line is called the "dead line."

A modern drawworks consists of five main parts: the drum, the power source, the reduction gear, the brake, and the auxiliary brake. The apparatus can be powered by electricity (AC or DC), or the drawworks may be connected directly to internal combustion engines using metal chain-like belts. The number of gears could be one, two or three speed combinations. The main brake, usually operated manually by a long handle, may be a friction band brake, a disc brake or a modified clutch. It serves as a parking brake when no motion is desired. The auxiliary brake is connected to the drum, and absorbs the energy released as heavy loads are lowered. This brake may use eddy current rotors or water-turbine-like apparatus to convert the kinetic energy of the moving load to heat and dissipate it.

Power catheads (winches) located on each side provide the means of actuating the tongs used to couple and uncouple threaded pipe members. Outboard catheads can be used manually with ropes for various small hoisting jobs around the rig.

The drawworks often has a pulley drive arrangement on the front side to provide turning power to the rotary table, although on many rigs the rotary table is independently powered.

The drawworks is used to hoist or lower several hundred thousand pounds of weight and comes in AC, DC or mechanical power units. Horsepower ratings for drawworks can also have a wide range, often ranging from 1000 HP to over 9000 HP.
