= Tripping (pipe) =

Drilling term

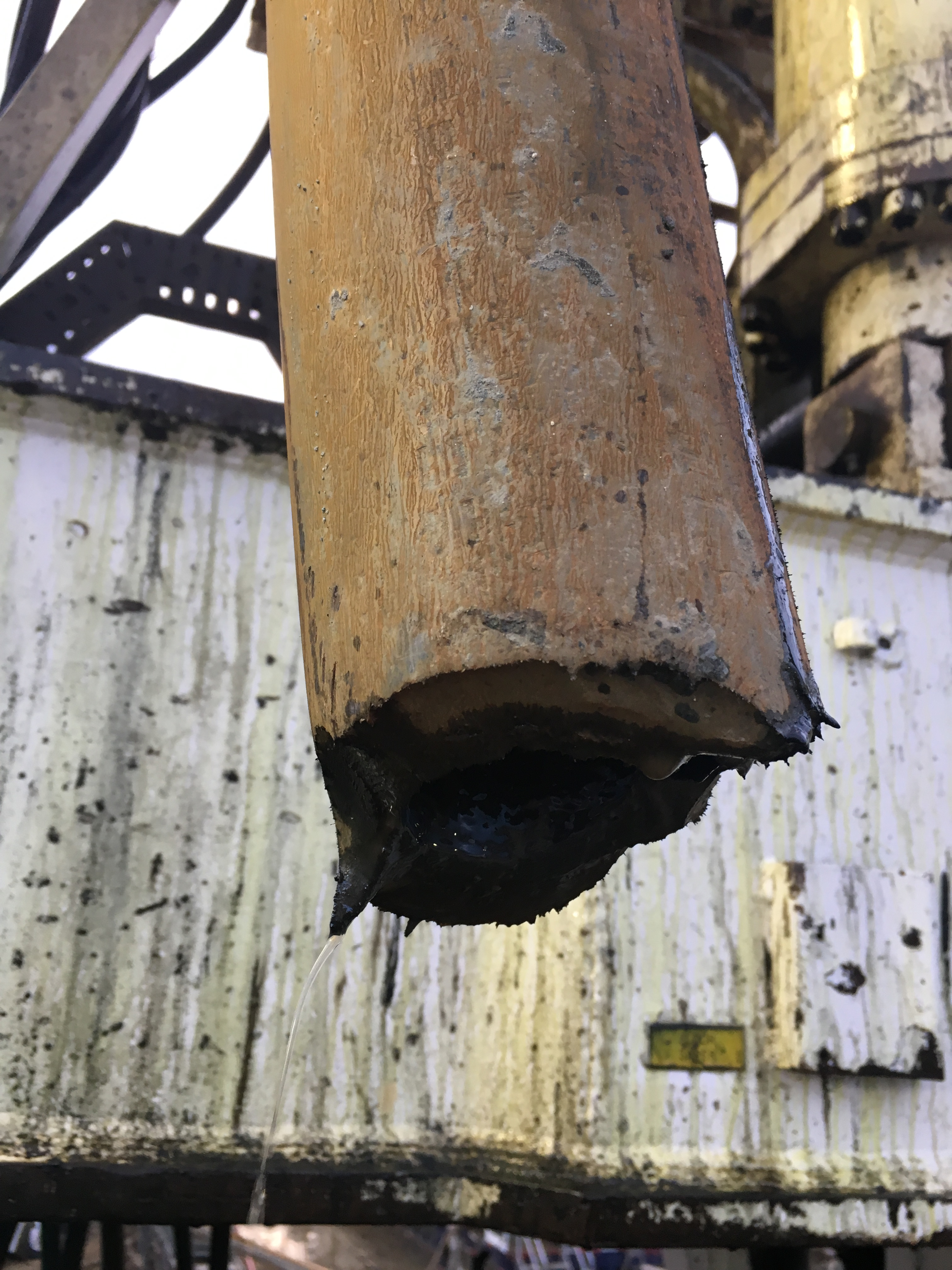
Heavy-weight drill string part due to stress cracking

Tripping pipe (or "Making a round trip" or simply "Making a trip") is the physical act of pulling the drill string out of the wellbore and then running it back in. This is done by physically breaking out or disconnecting (when pulling out of the hole) every other 2 or 3 joints of drill pipe at a time (called a stand) and racking them vertically in the derrick. When feasible the driller will start each successive trip on a different "break" so that after several trips fresh pipe dope will have been applied (when running back in the hole) to every segment of the drill string.

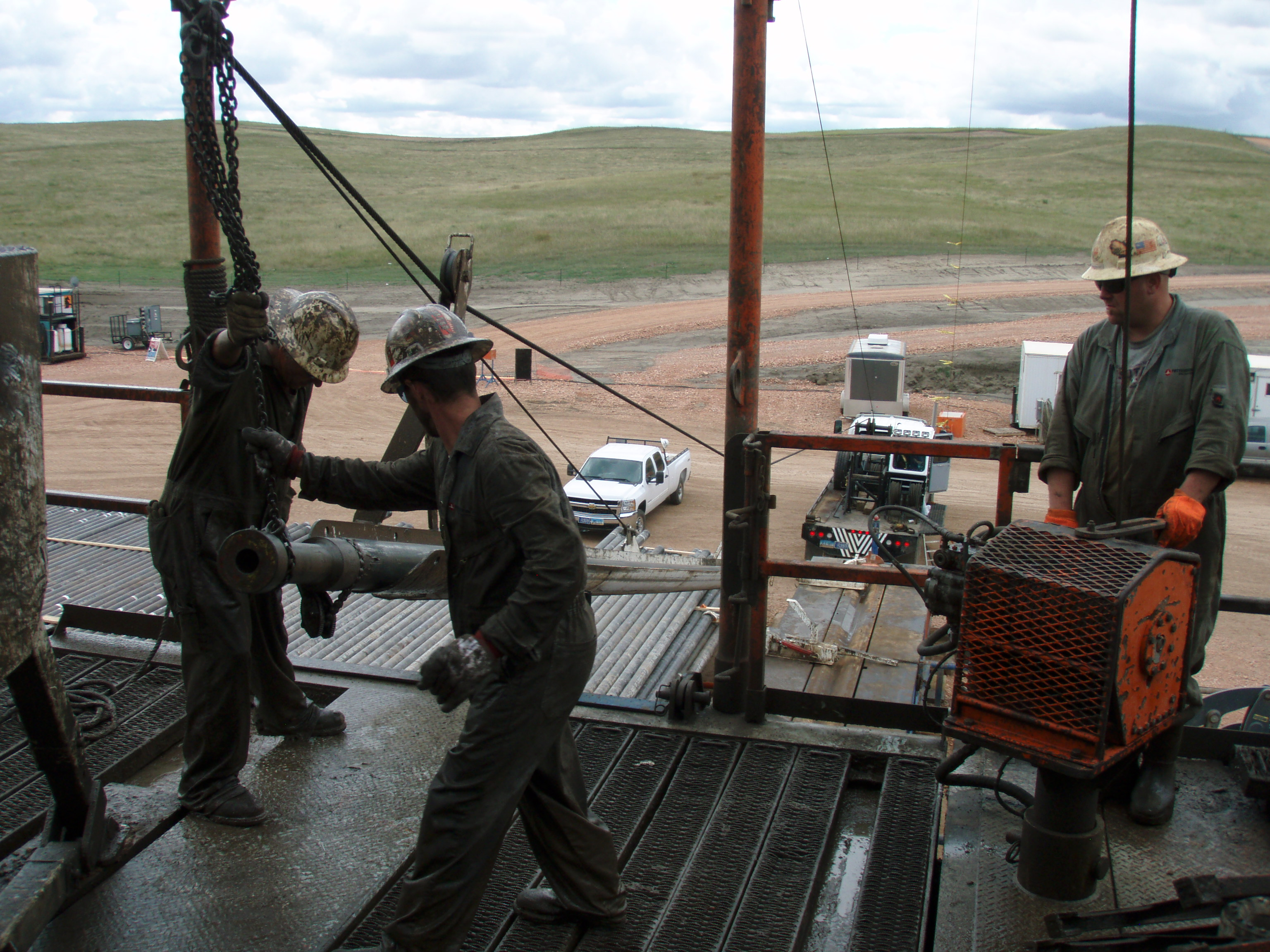
Pulling Pipe on the Derrick Floor preparing to trip into the hole

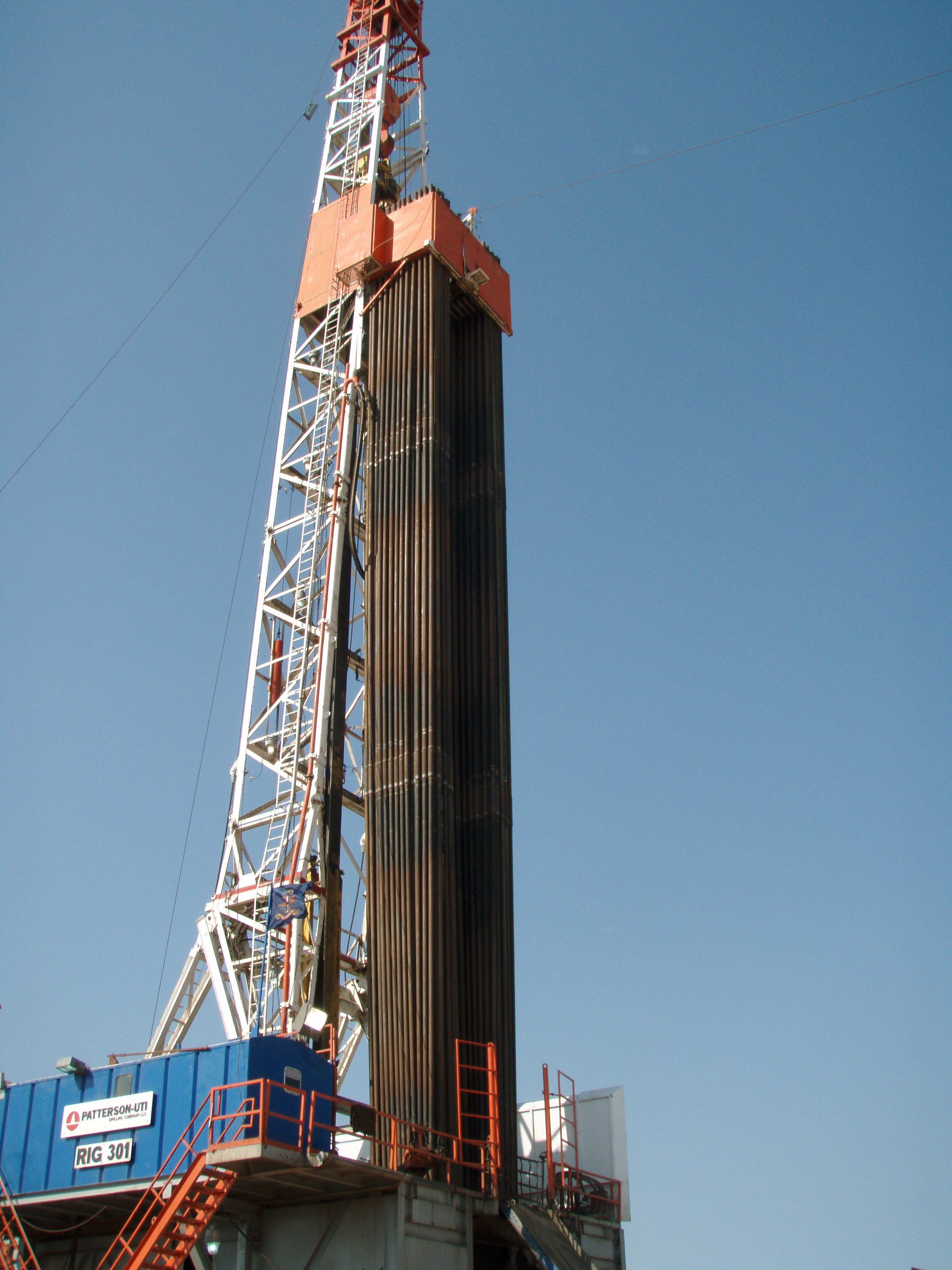
Collection of 90 foot stands after tripping out of the hole for a bit trip

The most typical reason for tripping pipe is to replace a worn-out drill bit. Though there are many problems that occur to warrant the tripping of pipe. Downhole tools such as MWD (measurement while drilling), LWD (logging while drilling) or mud motors break down quite often. Another common reason for tripping is to replace damaged drill pipe. It is important to get the pipe out of the wellbore quickly and safely before it can snap.

== Bit trip ==
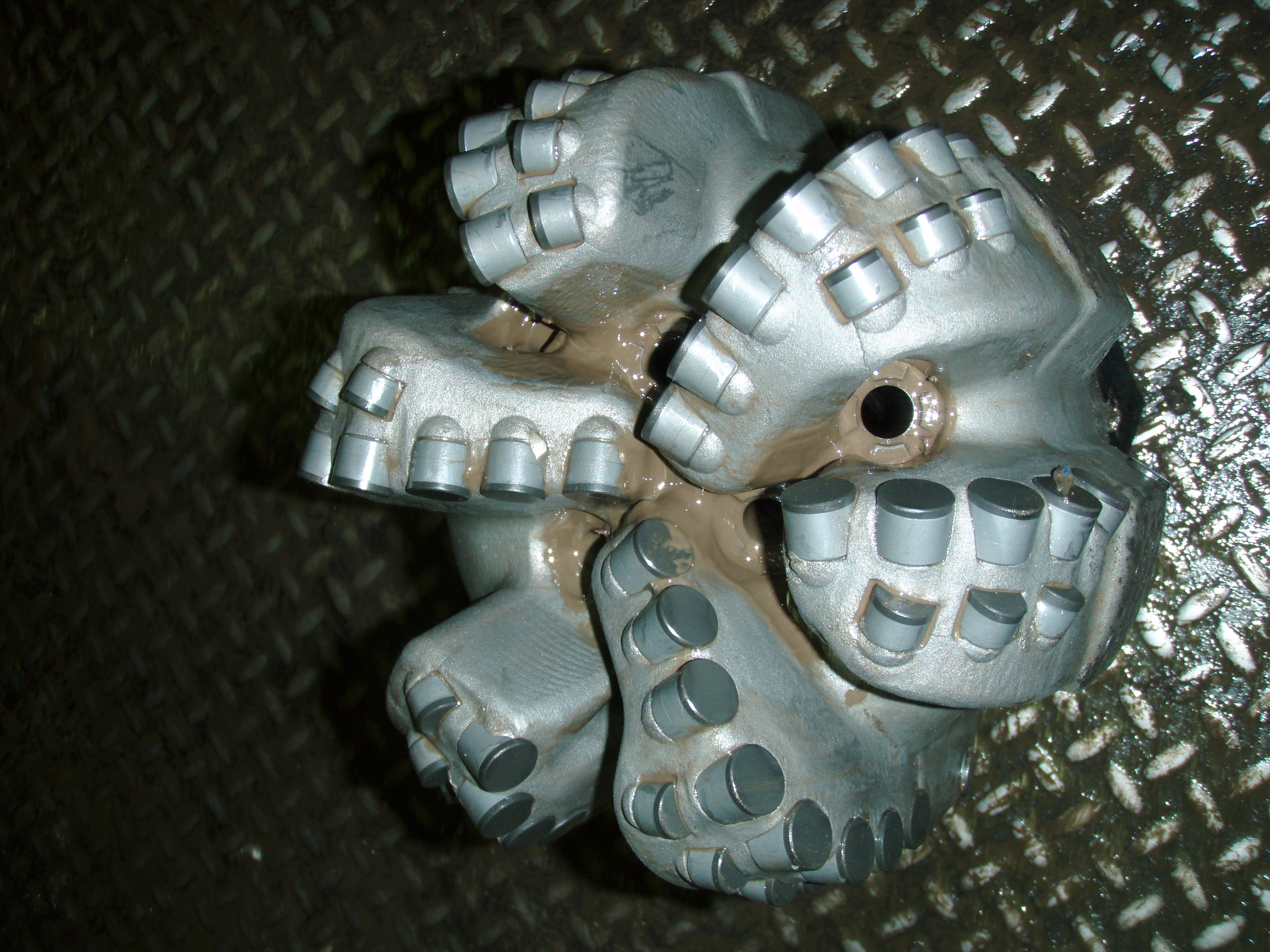
Vertical Drill Bit

Drill bits wear and tear like most any other piece of equipment. Once a bit becomes too worn to drill at an adequate rate or make a full-gauge hole, or if the bearings are thought to be near failure, a trip is undertaken to replace the bit. A trip is not considered a bit trip when the purpose of replacing the bit is to change sizes. This is only done when the crew "sets surface, intermediate or longstring" as appropriate.

== Fishing trip ==
A fishing trip is when a crew is forced to trip pipe to retrieve loose items in the wellbore. This can result from something being dropped in the hole, i.e. a tool, that would cause damage to the bit if the crew attempted to drill with it on bottom.

=== Twisting off ===
Another major cause is known as a "twist off". Twisting off is when the drill string parts by failing catastrophically under the torsional stress. This may happen if the drill string below is pinched in the wellbore, or as the result of a structural weakening of the pipe caused by a washout or a crack in a threaded connection member.

=== Broken string or broken bit ===
When pipe snaps or a part of the bit breaks off, the crew has to recover all of the separated items from the wellbore. Recovering snapped pipe usually involves placing a specialized tool (an "overshot") with grips set inside of it over the broken pipe in an attempt to capture it. The grip works in a manner similar to Chinese fingercuffs. Sometimes the jagged top of the fish must be milled back to a round outside shape before the overshot can slip over it. The overshot contains a packoff device to make a pressure seal so circulation can be reestablished through the bit to facilitate recovery of the fish. For a broken bit, a magnet is commonly used to remove all of the broken parts.

=== Cracked pipe or collar ===
A cracked pipe can lead to a broken string. Extra care is taken when tripping for one so that too much pull does not cause the cracked pipe to snap. Cracked pipes (i.e., washouts) are usually noticed by a sudden drop in pressure. The crew will usually pump "fastline" (small lengths of manila rope taken from unraveled catline) down the drill string to make a temporary plug and time the pressure to see when it rises back to normal. This enables the crew to know how far down to expect the cracked pipe to be within a few stands; also strands of these rope segments may be seen at the point of washout. Most trips for a cracked pipe are not complete trips like a fishing trip or a bit trip. These can be as simple as only going a few stands down, to pulling the drill collars.

== Logging ==
Logging of the open hole may take place at various depths while drilling, and almost always at the end of the drilling operation. The drill string will be removed from the wellbore to allow a logging crew to conduct a survey of the well. After the logging is completed at total depth, the crew will run the drill string back into the well and then proceed to lay it down when coming out of the hole prior to installing the final set of casing (the "production casing").

== Setting surface, intermediate and longstring ==
These trips are routinely expected by the crew. Setting surface occurs after the wellbore is drilled to the predetermined surface depth (e.g., after drilling below fresh water strata). The crew will remove the entire drill string to allow surface casing to be emplaced. The procedure is similar for setting intermediate, only that it typically involves a much longer drill string to be removed. Setting longstring is usually a one time operation combining both surface and intermediate casing. This saves the time of only having to undertake one pipe trip as opposed to two pipe trips.

== See also ==
- See Drilling rig (petroleum) for a diagram of a drilling rig.
