= Measured depth =

Length of an oil borehole

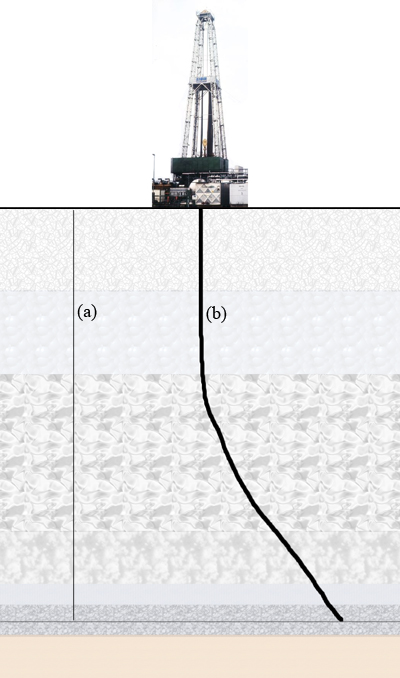
(a) is an imaginary line representing the true vertical depth, while line (b) is the borehole itself, and its length is called the measured depth.

In the oil industry measured depth (commonly referred to as MD, or just the depth) is the length of the drilled borehole. In conventional vertical wells, this coincides with the true vertical depth, but in directional or horizontal wells, especially those using extended reach drilling, the two can deviate greatly. For example, at the time of writing (2012) a borehole in Odoptu field, Sakhalin-I, has the greatest measured depth of any borehole at 12,345 m, but most of this is horizontal, giving it a true vertical depth of only 1,784 m. For comparison, the Kola Superdeep Borehole has a slightly shorter measured depth at 12,262 m, but since this is a vertical borehole, this is also equal to the true vertical depth, making the Kola Superdeep Borehole deeper by a factor of 6.9.

== See also ==
- Depth in a well
- True vertical depth
- Driller's depth
