= Swivel (drill rig) =

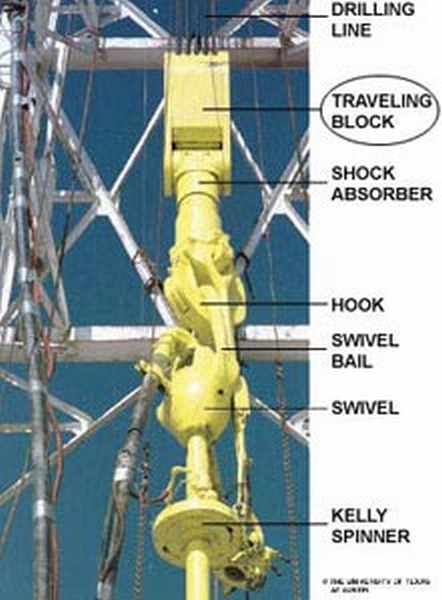

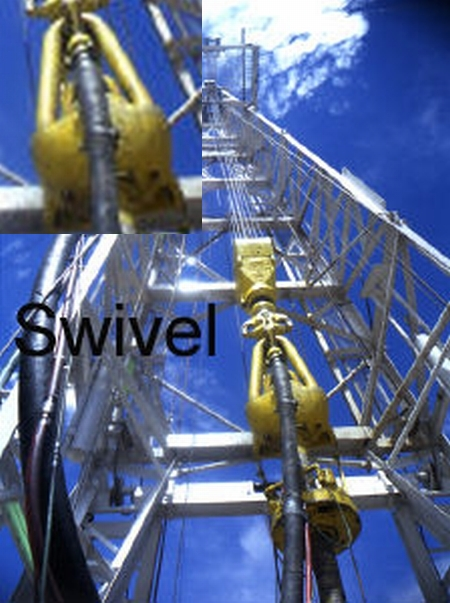

A swivel is a mechanical device used on a drilling rig that hangs directly under the traveling block and directly above the kelly drive, that provides the ability for the kelly (and subsequently the drill string) to rotate while allowing the traveling block to remain in a stationary rotational position (yet allow vertical movement up and down the derrick) while simultaneously allowing the introduction of drilling fluid into the drill string.

See Drilling rig (petroleum) for a diagram of a drilling rig.
