= Flow line =

A flow line, used on a drilling rig, is a large diameter pipe (typically a section of casing) that is connected to the bell nipple (under the drill floor) and extends to the possum belly (on the mud tanks) and acts as a return line (for the drilling fluid as it comes out of the hole), to the mud.

== Possum Belly ==
The possum belly is used to slow the flow of returning drilling fluid before it hits the shale shakers. This enables the shale shaker to clean the cuttings out of the drilling fluid before it is returned to the pits for circulation.

== Sample Box ==
Another common add on is the sample box. This is a heavy duty rubber hose that is inserted at the end of the flow line and at the other end emplaced into the sample box itself. The sample box is used to capture samples of drill cuttings for geological logging. The box is typically equipped with a raising door that allows the water and cuttings to escape after a sample is collected.

== Stinger Line ==
A stinger line is similar to a flow line, but unlike a flow line, it is not used to maintain circulation. The stinger line is attached to the blowout preventer to allow for the pressure from a blowout to be released. The stinger line usually will run parallel to the flow line.

== See also ==
- Drilling rig (petroleum)
- Flow show
