= Standpipe =

Standpipe may refer to:

- Standpipe (firefighting), a rigid vertical or horizontal pipe to which fire hoses can be connected
- Standpipe (street), an external freestanding pipe to provide running water in areas with no other water supply
- Standpipe water tower
- Standpipe (plumbing), a vertical pipe attached to a p-trap for rapid high-volume wastewater drainage such as from washing machines
- Standpipe piezometer, a device that monitors groundwater levels through a borehole
- Rig standpipe, part of a drilling rig
