= TVD =

TVD may refer to:

- True vertical depth, the vertical depth of the drill bit, used while directional drilling, especially when horizontal.
- Total variation diminishing
- The Vampire Diaries, an American television series which began airing in 2009
- The Vampire Diaries (novel series), a young adult vampire fiction series of novels created by American author L. J. Smith and it is based on the American television series The Vampire Diaries
- ISO 4217 code for Tuvaluan dollar
