= Possum belly =

A Possum belly, on a drilling rig, is a metal container at the head of the shale shaker that receives the flow of drilling fluid and is directly connected to and at the end of the flow line. A possum belly may also be referred to as a distribution box or flowline trap.

The purpose of the possum belly is to slow the flow of the drilling fluid (after it has gained momentum from coming down through the flow line) so that it does not shoot off of the shale shakers.

Possum bellies are generally used when bentonite or another form of "mud" is being used. During the use of freshwater or brine water, the flow line generally either goes straight to the reserve pit, or into the steel pits.

The possum belly derives its name from the similarity of its appearance to the low hanging abdomen of the possum.
