= Stand (drill pipe) =

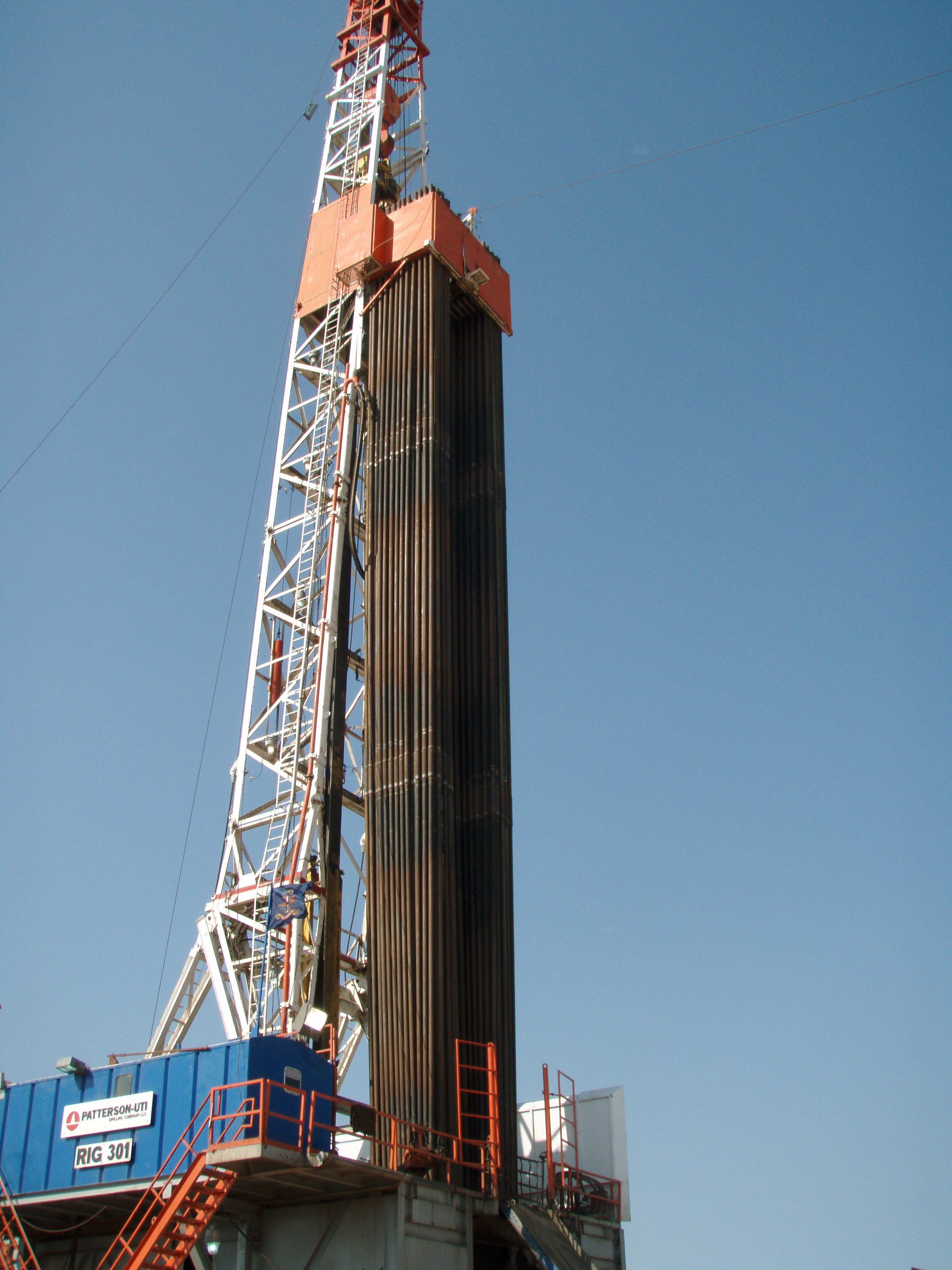
A collection of 90 foot stands after tripping out of the hole for a bit trip

A stand (of drill pipe) is two or three joints of drill pipe connected and stood in the derrick vertically, usually while tripping pipe. A stand of collars is similar, only made up of collars and a collar head. The collar head is screwed into the collar to allow it to be picked up by the elevators.

Stands are emplaced inside of the "board" of the drilling rig. They are usually kept between "fingers". Most boards will allow stands to go ten stands deep and as much as fifty stands wide on land based rigs. The stands are further held in place using ropes in the board which are tied in a shoe knot by the derrickman.

Stands are emplaced on the floor of the drilling rig by the chain hand. When stands are being put onto the floor the chainhand is said to be "racking stands". After the bottom of the stand is placed on the floor, the derrickman will unlatch the elevators and pull the stand in either with a rope or with just his arms. When stands are being put back into the hole, the derickman will slam the stand into the elevators to force them to latch. The chainhand will brace against the stand to control it when the driller picks it up. This is referred to as "tailing the pipe" as the chain hand will hold the pipe and allow it to semi-drag them back to the hole. The chain hand then passes it off to the tong hand, who then "stabs" the stand into the pipe already in the hole.

Rigs are generally sized by how many stands they can hold in their derrick. Most land based rigs are referred to as "triples" because they hold three joints per stand in their derrick. "Singles" generally do not hold any pipe in the derrick and instead require pipe to be laid down during a pipe trip.

== See also ==
- Drilling rig (petroleum)
