= Mud Gun =

A mud gun is designed for use in a solids control system of a drilling rig. It is a tool which is mainly used for mixing drilling mud in the circulatory system and to prevent the mud from precipitating. The structure of equipment is simple offering flexible operation and easy use. A mud gun is commonly used to guard against precipitates in a solids control system. The mud gun is installed in a mud tank.

Furthermore, it is usually used together with mud agitator. The mud agitator is used in the middle of the tank while the mud gun is placed in the corner of the tank.
