= Flow show =

A flow show is a device on a drilling rig that is attached to the flow line and has a paddle that swings out as the flow of drilling fluid passes by it. The angle of the paddle increases as the volume of drilling fluid increases and pushes it out further and vice versa. The purpose of the flow show is to allow the driller (and other rig personnel) to monitor the flow of drilling fluid as it comes out of the hole.

The reasons for monitoring the flow:

- If a high pressure zone is drilled and overcomes the hydrostatic pressure of the column of drilling fluid, the fluid or gas in the high-pressure zone will begin to enter the borehole and increase the amount of fluid coming out of the hole. By monitoring the flow, rig personnel will know in advance before the flow becomes critical.
- If a low pressure zone is drilled and is overcome by the hydrostatic pressure of the column of drilling fluid, the low pressure zone may begin to take fluid and decrease the amount of fluid coming out of the hole. By monitoring the flow, rig personnel will know in advance before losing too much drilling fluid (which is typically very expensive) down the hole and/or losing so much fluid that the hydrostatic pressure of the (decreasing) column of mud becomes so low that a blowout situation becomes imminent.

== See also ==
- Drilling rig (petroleum)
