= Bell nipple =

Pipe component

A bell nipple is a section of pipe with a flared top, fitted to the top of the blowout preventers that the flow line attaches to via a side outlet, to allow the drilling fluid to flow back over the shale shakers to the mud tanks.

See drilling rig (petroleum) for a diagram.
