= Well depth =

Well depth may refer to:

- Depth in a well, a measurement of location in oil and gas drilling and production
- The charge capacity of each pixel in a charge-coupled device
