= Drill bit (disambiguation) =

A drill bit is a tool used in a drill to create circular holes.

Drill bit or Drillbit may also refer to:

- Chicago Spire, a former building nicknamed the "Drill Bit"
- Drill bit (well), drill bits used for oil wells, etc.

== Fictional characters ==
- Drill bit, a character in the Transformers anime and toy series, sometimes accompanying Heavy Load, a member of the Build Team
- Drillbit, another character in the Transformers anime and toy series, an Autobot and personal attendant to Metroplex, leader of Gigantion
- Drillbit Taylor, the lead character in the 2008 comedy film of the same name

== See also ==
- Dilbit, diluted bitumen, a petroleum product
