= Driller's depth =

The original depth recorded while drilling an oil or gas well is known as the driller's depth.

== The problem ==
Since there is not a single reference or measurement system for calculating the depth in sub-surface environments, two engineers talking about a single drilling might give different answers when asked to give a measurement of depth.

The two main depth references used in the "downhole" (i.e. sub-surface) environment are driller's depths and logger's depths (also called wireline logger's depths). These measurement systems are recorded quite differently and logger's depths are generally considered the more accurate of the two:

- Driller's depth measurement is tied to drilling operations and other closely associated activities such as logging while drilling), measurement while drilling, and coring.
- Driller's depth is always recorded, and it constitutes the primary depth system, unless it is later superseded by a more accurate measurement such as the depth from an open- or cased-hole wireline log.
- Driller's depth should always have 1) a unit of measurement e.g. meter or feet, 2) a datum reference e.g. rig floor.

=== Measurement of Driller's Depth ===
There are several parts of the drilling site to be considered while measuring:

- The assembly of rotating parts that goes down the hole, which is a series of drill pipe connections and drill collars, ending in a rotating bit. There may optionally be tools for logging while drilling as well. The length of all these is measured, and this gives the driller's depth at a given point in time. As more pipe is added, and the drilling deepens, this measurement will be updated.
- On land, the floor of the rig provides us with a starting altitude, and all depth measurements are calculated relative to it. Since it is unlikely for the height of the ground to change significantly during drilling, this is assumed to be absolute.
- Offshore, this absolute datum must be independent of the tide. Common absolute datum include (lowest astronomical tide) and mean sea level). This is most relevant for wells drilled from floating rigs, where the potential for error is greatest.

In practice, driller's depth measurement is a manual operation, not changed significantly over the years and there are many facets of the system with potential to introduce errors and inconsistencies. This process was first described by Reistle and Sikes in 1938, and has not changed significantly.

=== Measuring drill string length ===
==== Lack of uniformity of drill pipe ====
The bulk of the drill string is drill pipe which has a nominal length of 9.6 meter per pipe section, however, in reality, not all pipes are the same length. Weakened or damaged ends of a pipe section will be reworked, resulting in reduced length.

Steel pipe has a "male" connection at one end (called the pin) and a "female" connection at the other end (called the box) and as each section of pipe is lowered into the hole it is connected to the pipe preceding it by threading together the male and female components. Drill pipe connections (or drill pipe/collar, or collar/bit and any other connection) must have a very good sealing surface because high pressure mud will be traveling through the pipe and any pitted or galled areas could be quickly eroded out. This is usually referred to as a wash-out, or words to that effect, and can occur in any part of the drill string or bottom hole assembly. Because of this pipe is routinely inspected before and after use. Any imperfections are eliminated one of two actions:

1. A "Chase and Face", where a thin section is shaved off the end of the pipe, and the box, or pin, is re-threaded resulting in pipe length reduction
2. A "Re-cut", where the pipe threads are effectively moved further down, again resulting in reduced overall length

Different methods of measuring the drill pipe length also have a significant effect on the accuracy of the measurement made. Pipe "strapping" is commonly used to define drill pipe length, where the pipe is measured on the pipe racks using a (steel) measure tape. These results are noted in a tally book, and the drillstring length is hence defined. However, the accuracy of this measurement method is limited by the application of the steel tape correctly, the reading accuracy, and a host of environmental issues. A significant improvement to drill pipe measurement accuracy is provided using laser, and accuracies can be easily improved by around factor 4. It is also important to note the calibration conditions so that corrections can be applied based on these calibration conditions. This is specifically true for temperature when defining the thermal elongation.

==== Tracking of drill pipe length used ====
Tracking and recording of drill pipe at the rig site starts when individual joints are picked up. Joint numbers are manually marked on the side of the pipe. Typically three sections of pipe are joined into a stand (of about 27–29 m in length) and stacked in rows of 10, with their base resting on the drill floor. Prior to running in the hole each stand is manually measured with a steel tape measure and the measurement recorded in a computer spreadsheet (previously a pipe tally book was used) alongside the stand number. To confirm at any stage what depth the drill bit is operating at, the driller consults the pipe tally records, and measures the length of the current stand of drill pipe below the rig floor.

=== Measurement errors due to bottom-hole assembly ===
Another potential area for error is the bottom hole assembly. This consists of the drill bit, drill collars and stabilizers. It can also include a downhole motor, tools for measurement while drilling and logging while drilling. Errors come about if the total bottom hole assembly is not correctly measured or recorded. Bottom hole assembly changes may be made during operations and if these changes are not recorded then the depths will be incorrect.

Ideally the bottom hole assembly is operated to minimize "sagging" within the borehole. Pipe stretch and compression will occur from time to time but are not corrected for during normal operations, even though they can introduce fairly significant cumulative errors on driller's depth, particularly in deep wells or in areas of hard rock.

== Dealing with driller depth errors ==
If exploration derived prognosticated depths are significantly different from the driller's depths, for example by 10−30 m, then warning bells come up – it is possible a pipe section or stand has been left off the calculations. If this is suspected, then the drill string should be measured (in tension) when the string is next pulled out of the hole, and the results checked with the tally. Mudloggers should be vigilant, as they provide the opportunity to cross check with the drilling company.

An important aspect in this is identifying the required accuracy for the logged driller's depths. If drillers and geologists are "OK" with (for example, +/- 15 m) at these depths, but later the reservoir engineers trying to map fluid water contacts require a higher level of precision (for example, +/- 3 m), then by the time the drilling is finished the higher level of accuracy cannot be recreated. This leads to the concept of true along-hole depth, where the measurements made are defined using the accuracy of the pipe length calibration method and (if any) the accuracy of the corrections applied the correction methodology.

One methodology that has been introduced is called Driller Way-point Depth (patent applied) which results in true along-hole depth. The measurement uncertainty is then a combination of the drill pipe length measurement accuracy, how accurately the correction parameters are measured, and the fidelity of the correction model applied.

== Examples ==
For some deep wells, e.g. 7,000 m or 25,000 ft deep, the drill pipe elongation due to its own weight and temperature must be taken into account. This can be on the order of 24 m (80 ft). Wireline does not behave this way: it tends to lengthen under tension but shorten with increasing temperature. One can only assume by how much this net effect varies. Wireline depth correction for temperature and tension has been around since before the days of computer data acquisition, and is generally seen as reliable. Based on experience, the impact on a geological model previously based on wireline depth, when drilling at greater than 7,000 m and using logging while drilling (driller's) depths, can introduce differences in marker depths of up to 25 m (80 ft): the driller's depths are consistently higher than the more reliable wireline depths.

The driller's survey do not call this elongation an uncertainty but rather call it bias or error. For the example above, in addition to the 25 m (+80 ft) bias, there would be about ± 3 m/12 ft to 10 m/30 ft residual uncertainty depending on hole inclination. There are a few in the industry who know how to correct for this real time and some service companies have developed conceptual or prototype tools/processes to account for this elongation effect. In future, these corrections should become standard practice for the industry, but they are not As of 2013. The determination of an accurate depth has not traditionally been a popular area of research primarily because of lack of recognition of the impact that depth measurement inaccuracy has on the value of the depth data. The impact of errors in depth is most critical when integrating data from more than one well, e.g. to build a reservoir model. This impact, however, is usually apparent only long after the depth measurement process has occurred and is not seen as being an issue during the well construction.

Recognition of the value of depth measurement accuracy at the planning stages of drilling, and then during the drilling process itself, is a precursor to achieving improving accuracy.

== Glossary of terms ==
- Absolute depth: distance along a path (along hole, vertical, etc.) between a reference point (rotary table, ground level, mean sea level, etc.) and a given point downhole (after Ref. 3, §13.2).
- True Along-Hole (TAH) depth: along-hole depth based on a calibrated and corrected measurement with an associated uncertainty

== See also ==
- Specification of depth
- Well logging
