= Elevators (drilling rig) =

Elevators, as developed for the drilling industry, are a hinged device with handles that are used to wrap around the tool joint of drill pipe, casing or lift nipples (for collars) to facilitate the lifting or lowering of them singly or of the drill string as a whole.

In practical use elevators are highly stressed components and require regular careful inspection. In practice, sets of elevators and a spare duplicate are required on-site for general operations. Their failure almost always stops operations.

To latch around a piece of pipework a set of elevators need a precise internal diameter, with an appropriately profiled shoulder to accommodate the lower profile of a tool joint. The latch mechanism has to prevent opening under radial loads of up to hundreds of tons. For some purposes (casing elevators, and loading pipe into and out of the derrick), the elevators also need to resist cross-axial loads of the weight of the pipe joints.
