= Kelly hose =

A kelly hose (also known as a mud hose or rotary hose) is a flexible, steel reinforced, high pressure hose that connects the standpipe to the kelly (or more specifically to the goose-neck on the swivel above the kelly) and allows free vertical movement of the kelly while facilitating the flow of drilling fluid through the system and down the drill string. The Kelly hose has a diameter of 3-5 inches (inside diameter).
