= Mousehole (drilling) =

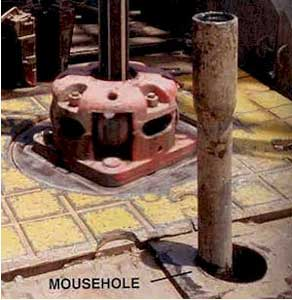
The mousehole of a drill rig

The mousehole is the storage area on a drilling rig where the next joint of drilling pipe is held until needed. This hole is in the floor of the rig, bored into the earth for a short way, and usually lined with a metal casing known as a scabbard.

The purpose is to have the top of the piece of drill pipe on a level with the kelly when the time comes to add the new piece of drill pipe.
