= Directional well =

Oil well with a borehole that deviates from a vertically straight line

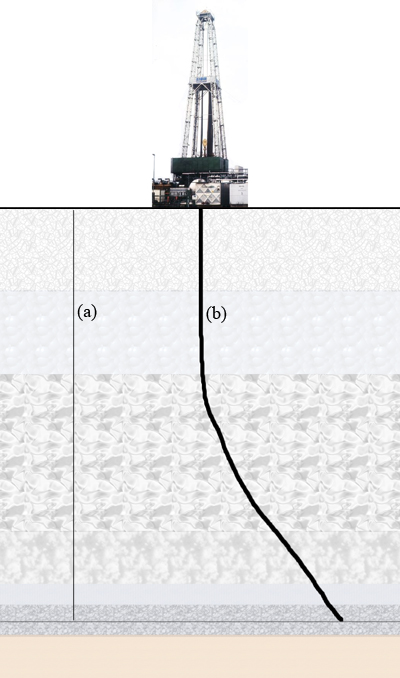
Depiction of a directional well. Line (a) is an imaginary line representing the true vertical depth, while line (b) is the borehole itself, and its length is called the measured depth

A directional well is the oil industry term for an oil well with a borehole that deviates from a vertically straight line. This is normally done with the intention of hitting several target sands, for instance.
