= Conductor pipe =

Oil well and borehole component

A conductor pipe is a large diameter pipe that is set into the ground to provide the initial stable structural foundation for a borehole or oil well. It is the first string of casing, and of the largest diameter installed into a well. It can also be referred to as a drive pipe because it is often driven into the ground with a pile driver.

Conductor pipes are typically set into petroleum wells before any drilling operations are performed. It is usually set with special pile-driving or spudder rigs, though a drilling rig is sometimes used to save time and money. The pipe's purpose is to protect shallow sands from being contaminated by drilling fluids, and to prevent washouts, which occur near the surface due to loose and unconsolidated top soils and gravel beds.

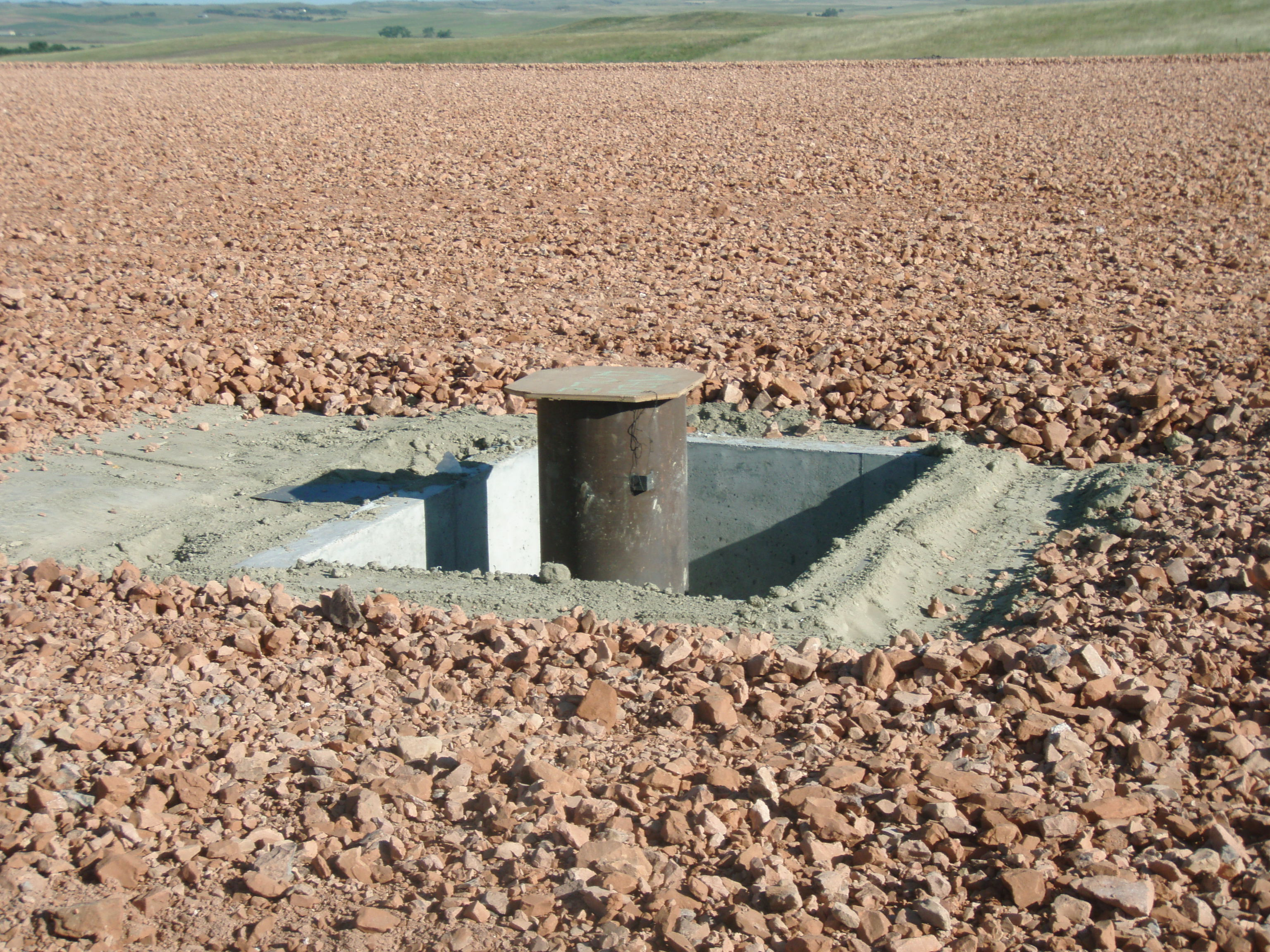
Conductor Casing

In the offshore drilling industry, the conductor pipe is set in the seabed, and is a key structural foundation for the subsea wellhead. When drilling an offshore well, a marine riser is connected to the well, and this is subjected to large environmental forces such as current and waves which are transferred to the conductor. The forces can be large and also cyclical which can potentially cause fatigue damage to the conductor, especially in harsh environmental conditions. A Conductor tensioner unit (CTU) can be used in shallow water on jackup rig to withstand such damaging forces.

Conductors are sometimes driven into position in very soft formations with large hammers. Sometimes, they are jetted into position and at other times, a separate cheaper rig (even truck mounted) may be used to drill the hole for the conductor. Offshore, two conductors may be installed in a well. The first conductor might be driven into position and not reach a depth sufficient for installation of a BOP. Usually secondary conductors are cemented to surface.

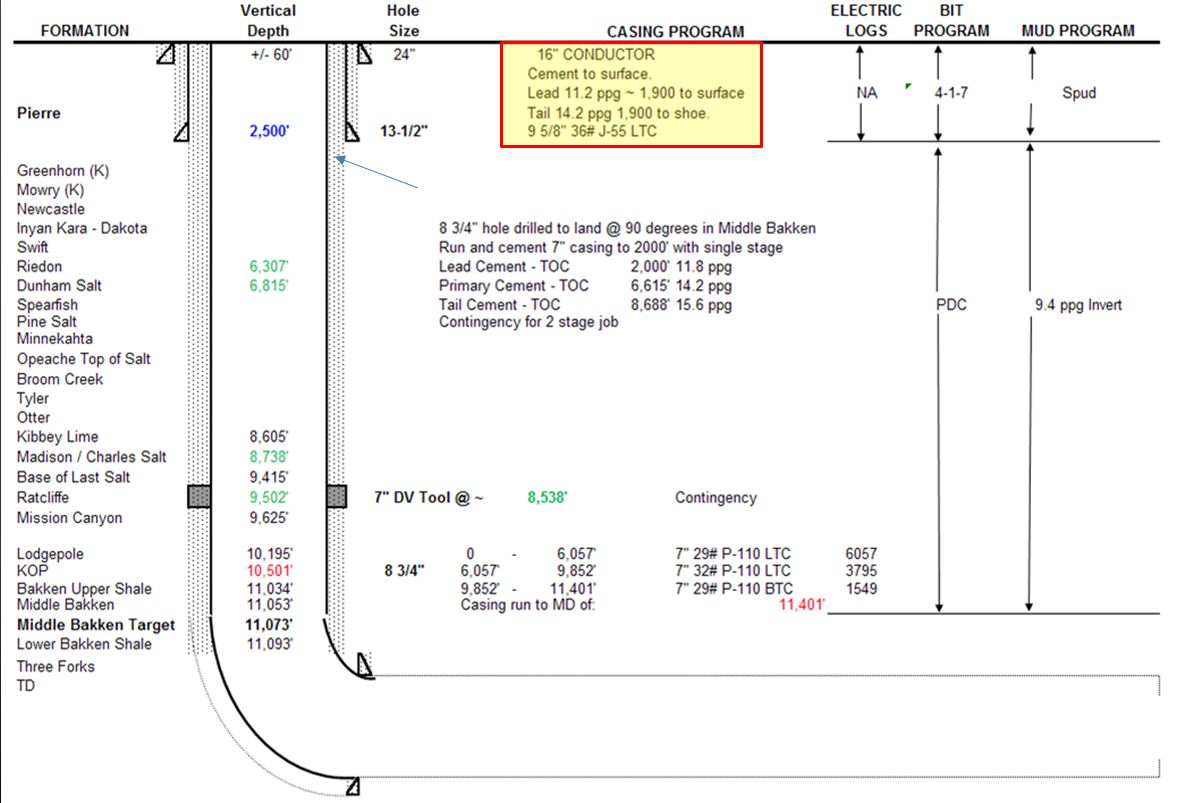
WB Diagram Conductor Pipe location
