= True vertical depth =

Depth of a hole measured vertically down

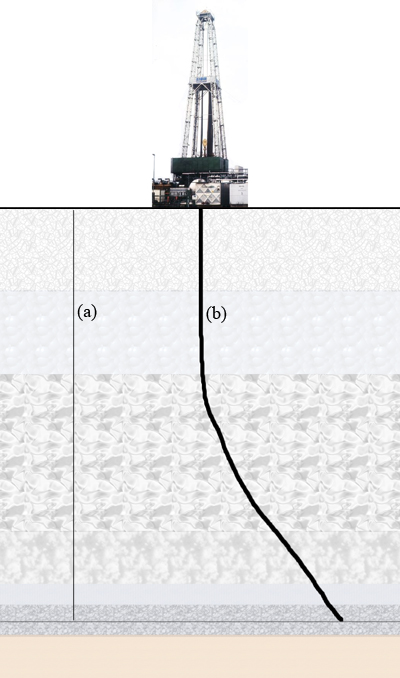
(a) is an imaginary line representing the true vertical depth, while line (b) is the borehole itself, and its length is called the measured depth, which can be calculated via arc length.

True vertical depth, abbreviated as TVD, is the measurement of a straight line perpendicularly downwards from a horizontal plane.

In the petroleum industry true vertical depth is the measurement from the surface to the bottom of the borehole (or anywhere along its length) in a straight perpendicular line represented by line (a) in the image.

Line (b) is the actual borehole and its length would be considered the "measured depth" in oil industry terminology. The TVD is always equal to or less than (≤) the measured depth. If one were to imagine line (b) to be a piece of string, and further were to imagine it being pulled straight down, one would observe it to be longer than line (a). This example oil well would be considered a directional well because it deviates from a straight vertical line.

== See also ==
- Depth in a well
- Driller's depth
