= Casing head =

In oil drilling, a casing head is a simple metal flange welded or screwed onto the top of the conductor pipe (also known as drive-pipe) or the casing and forms part of the wellhead system for the well.

== Application ==
Casing heads are the primary interface for the surface pressure control equipment, for example blowout preventers (for well drilling) or the Christmas tree (for well production).

The casing head, when installed, is typically tested to very strict pressure and leak-off parameters to insure viability under blowout conditions, before any surface equipment is installed.
