= Shaft collar =

Machine component found in many power transmission applications

Shaft collar to DIN 705

The shaft collar is a simple, yet important, machine component found in many power transmission applications, most notably motors and gearboxes. The collars are used as mechanical stops, locating components, and bearing faces. The simple design lends itself to easy installation.

== Set screw style ==
The first mass-produced shaft collars were set screw collars and were used primarily on line shafting in early manufacturing mills. These early shaft collars were solid ring types, employing square-head set screws that protruded from the collar. Protruding screws proved to be a problem because they could catch on a worker's clothing while rotating on a shaft, pulling the worker into the machinery.

Shaft collars saw few improvements until 1910 through 1911, when William G. Allen and Howard T. Hallowell, Sr, working independently, introduced commercially viable hex socket head set screws, and Hallowell patented a shaft collar with this safety-style set screw. His safety set collar was soon copied by others and became an industry standard. The invention of the safety set collar was the beginning of the recessed-socket screw industry.

Set screw collars are best used when the material of the shaft is softer than the set screw. Unfortunately, the set screw causes damage to the shaft – a flare-up of shaft material – which makes the collar harder to adjust or remove. It is common to machine small flats onto the shaft at the set screw locations to eliminate this problem.

== Clamping style ==
Clamp-style shaft collars are designed to solve the problems associated with the set-screw collar. They come in one- and two-piece designs. Instead of protruding into the shaft, the screws act to compress the collar and lock it into place. The connection between the shaft and the collar is made with friction. The ease of use is maintained with this design and there is no shaft damage. Since the screws compress the collar, a uniform distribution of force is imposed on the shaft, leading to a holding power that is nearly twice that of set-screw collars.

Although clamp-type collars work very well under relatively constant loads, shock loads can cause the collar to shift its position on the shaft. This is due to the very high forces that can be created by a relatively small mass during impact, compared to a statically or gradually applied load. As an option for applications with this type of loading, an undercut can be made on the shaft and a clamp collar can be used to create a positive stop that is more resistant to shock loads.

Perhaps the most innovative and useful of the collars is the two-piece clamping collar. Two-piece clamp-style shaft collars can be disassembled or installed in position without having to remove other components from the shaft. The two-piece design provides greater clamping force than a single piece clamp because all of the force is transferred directly into clamping the shaft. Also, the two piece collar has double the amount of screws the one piece has. In single piece designs, the non-tightened side provides negative force, as it must hold the collar open to allow it to be placed onto the shaft. The single tightener must work against this force as well as provide clamping force of its own.

Two-screw clamps still provide force on two sides (one dimension) only. Four (or more) screw clamps provide force on four (or more) sides, and thus two dimensions.

Quick- Clamping collars are a variation of a one piece collar style. The principal of the connection is the same. The only difference is that instead of tightening a screw you can just use the lever to open and close the collar. This is a lot faster and does not require any tools.

== Axial clamps ==
A further refinement of shaft collars is where a single bolt and nut surrounds the shaft. The bolt (exterior thread) has kerf cuts, making fingers, which are compressed onto the shaft as a nut is tightened over it. These are found on modern tripod legs and collets. If wrench-tightened, these can be very tight.

== Drill collars ==
In drilling, a drill collar consists of a heavy pipe above the drill bit in a drill string.

== Uses for Shaft Collars ==
Shaft collars can be found in virtually any type of machinery and are frequently accessories to other components. Capable of fulfilling many roles, shaft collars often hold bearings and sprockets on shafts, situate components in motor and gearbox assemblies, and serve as mechanical stops. Shaft collars are used in industrial equipment and machines as well as in light duty applications such as coat racks, on home gym equipment, or even in foosball tables.
