= Crown block =

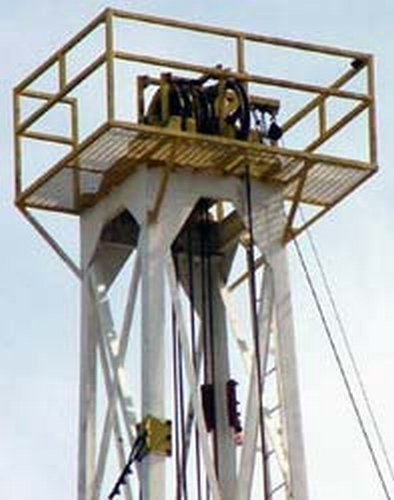
Crown block

A crown block is the stationary section of a block and tackle that contains a set of pulleys or sheaves through which the drill line (wire rope) is threaded or reeved and is opposite and above the traveling block.

The combination of the traveling block, crown block and wire rope drill line gives the ability to lift weights in the hundreds of thousands of pounds. When running heavy casing strings hook loads occasionally exceed one million pounds.

== See also ==
- List of components of oil drilling rigs
