= Mud pump =

Drilling component

A mud pump' (sometimes called a drilling mud pump) is a reciprocating piston or plunger pump used to circulate drilling fluid under high pressure down a drill string and back up the annular space between the drill pipe and the borehole. Mud pumps are an essential component of oil well drilling operations, helping to remove cuttings, cool the drill bit, and maintain wellbore pressure. Typical operating pressures can reach several thousand pounds per square inch, depending on pump design and drilling conditions.

== Classification ==
=== According to the acting type ===
Mud pumps can be divided into single-acting pump and double-acting pump according to the completion times of the suction and drainage acting in one cycle of the piston's reciprocating motion.

=== According to the quantity of liners (piston/plunger) ===
Mud pumps come in a variety of sizes and configurations but for the typical petroleum drilling rig, the triplex (three piston/plunger) mud pump is used. Duplex mud pumps (two piston/plungers) have generally been replaced by the triplex pump, but are still common in developing countries. Two later developments are the hex pump with six vertical pistons/plungers, and various quintuplexes with five horizontal piston/plungers. The advantages that these new pumps have over convention triplex pumps is a lower mud noise which assists with better measurement while drilling (MWD) and logging while drilling (LWD) decoding.

== Composition ==
The "normal" mud pump consists of two main sub-assemblies, the fluid end and the power end.

=== Fluid end ===
The fluid end produces the pumping process with valves, pistons, and liners. Because these components are high-wear items, modern pumps are designed to allow quick replacement of these parts.

To reduce severe vibration caused by the pumping process, these pumps incorporate both a suction and discharge pulsation damper. These are connected to the inlet and outlet of the fluid end.

=== Power end ===
The power end converts the rotation of the drive shaft to the reciprocating motion of the pistons. In most cases a crosshead crank gear is used for this.

=== Mud pump parts ===
A mud pump is composed of many parts including mud pump liner, mud pump piston, modules, hydraulic seat pullers, and other parts. Parts of a mud pump:

1. housing itself,
2. liner with packing,
3. cover plus packing,
4. piston and piston rod,
5. suction valve and discharge valve with their seats,
6. stuffing box (only in double-acting pumps),
7. gland (only in double-acting pumps),
8. pulsation damper.

== Performance parameters ==
There are two main parameters to measure the performance of a mud pump: displacement and pressure.

=== Displacement ===
Displacement is calculated as discharged liters per minute. It is related to the drilling hole diameter and the return speed of drilling fluid from the bottom of the hole, i.e. the larger the diameter of drilling hole, the larger the desired displacement. The return speed of drilling fluid should wash away the debris and rock powder cut by the drill from the bottom of the hole in a timely manner, and reliably carry them to the earth's surface. When drilling geological core, the speed is generally in range of 0.4 to 1.0 m^3/min.

=== Pressure ===
The pressure of the pump depends on the depth of the drilling hole, the resistance of flushing fluid (drilling fluid) through the channel, as well as the nature of the conveying drilling fluid. The deeper the drilling hole and the greater the pipeline resistance, the higher the pressure needed.

With the changes of drilling hole diameter and depth, the displacement of the pump can be adjusted accordingly. In the mud pump mechanism, the gearbox or hydraulic motor is equipped to adjust its speed and displacement. In order to accurately measure the changes in pressure and displacement, a flow meter and pressure gauge are installed in the mud pump.

== Characteristics ==
1. The structure is simple and easy to disassemble and maintain
2. Smooth operation, low vibration and low noise
3. Can deliver high concentration and high viscosity (less than 10000 PaS) suspended slurry
4. Drilling fluid flow is stable, no overcurrent, pulsation and stirred, shear slurry phenomena
5. Discharge pressure is not connected to speed; low flow can also maintain a high discharge pressure
6. Displacement is proportional to the speed, and can be adjusted by shifting the mechanism or motor
7. High self-absorption ability, and can suck liquid directly without bottom valve

== Maintenance ==
The construction department should have a special maintenance worker that is responsible for the maintenance and repair of the machine. Mud pumps and other mechanical equipment should be inspected and maintained on a scheduled and timely basis to find and address problems ahead of time, in order to avoid unscheduled shutdown. The worker should attend to the size of the sediment particles; if large particles are found, the mud pump parts should be checked frequently for wear, to see if they need to be repaired or replaced. The wearing parts for mud pumps include pump casing, bearings, impeller, piston, liner, etc. Advanced anti-wear measures should be adopted to increase the service life of the wearing parts, which can reduce the investment cost of the project, and improve production efficiency. At the same time, wearing parts and other mud pump parts should be repaired rather than replaced when possible.

== See also ==
- Centrifugal pump
- Diaphragm pump
