= Mud tank =

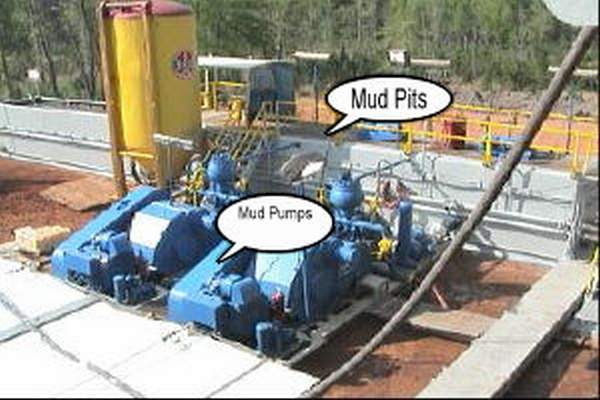
The mud tank is the long gray container.

A mud tank is an open-top container, typically made of square steel tube and steel plate, to store drilling fluid on a drilling rig. They are also called mud pits, as they were once simple pits in the earth.

== Structure ==
Mud tanks are divided into square tanks and cone-shaped tanks according to the shape difference of the tank bottom.

The body of the tank is made by welding the steel plate and section, using the smooth cone-shape structure or the corrugated structure. The mud tank surface and passages are made of slip resistant steel plate and expanded steel plate. The mud tanks are made of the side steel pipe, all of the structure can be folded without barrier and pegged reliably. The surface of the tank is equipped with a water pipeline for cleaning the surface and equipment on the tank, it uses soaked zinc processing for the expanded steel plate. The ladder is made of channel steel to take responsibility the body, the foot board is made of expanded steel plate. The two-sided guard rails are installed on the safe suspension hook. The mud tank is designed to be in a standard shanty to prevent the sand and the rain. The pipeline is installed in the tank to preserve the warm air.

The tanks are generally open-top and have walkways on top to allow a worker to traverse and inspect the level of fluids in the tanks. The walkways also allow access to other equipment that is mounted on the top. Recently, offshore drilling rigs have closed-in tanks for safety. The mud tank plays a critical role in mechanically removing destructive solids and sediment from costly land and offshore drilling systems.

A tank is sectioned off into different compartments. A compartment may include a settling tank, sometimes called a sand trap, to allow sand and other solids in the drilling fluid to precipitate before it flows into the next compartment. Other compartments may have agitators on the top, which have long impellers below inserting into the tank and stirring the fluids to prevent its contents from precipitating. And mud guns are often equipped at the corners of the tanks' top, spraying high-pressed mud to prevent the drilling fluids in the corner of the compartment from precipitating, typically for the square tanks.

The piping linking the mud tanks/pits with the mud pumps is called the suction line. This may be gravity fed or charged by centrifugal pumps to provide additional volumetric efficiency to the mud pumps.

== The role of mud tank for solids control ==
Mud tanks play an important role in a solids control system. It is the base of solids control equipment, and also the carrier of drilling fluids. Solids control equipment that are all mounted on the top of mud tanks include the following:

- shale shaker
- vacuum degasser
- desander
- desilter
- centrifuge
- mud agitator
- Vertical slurry pump

Drilling fluids flow into the shale shaker directly after it returns to the surface of the well, and the solids that are removed by the screen would be discharged out of the tank, and the drilling fluids with smaller solids would flow through the screen into mud tank for further purification. A centrifugal pump sucks the shaker-treated fluids up to the desilter or mud cleaner for further purification. And vertical slurry pump is used to pump the drilling fluids up to the centrifuge, and a mud pump would pump the drilling fluids from mud tank into the borehole after it is treated by centrifuge and the circulation system continues.

The number of the mud tanks that are needed on the drilling rig depends on the depth of the well, and also the mud demands of drilling. Normally the shale shaker and vacuum degasser and desander are mounted together on the same mud tank as the first tank at the oilfield, while desilter and centrifuge on the second tank. Also, the drilling rig has other different tanks such as a reserve tank, emergency tank, etc.

== Classification ==
Mud tanks are an important part in the solids control system. Based on functions, mud tanks include metering tanks, circulating tanks, chemical tanks, aggravating tanks, precipitating tanks, storing tanks, etc.
