= Traveling block =

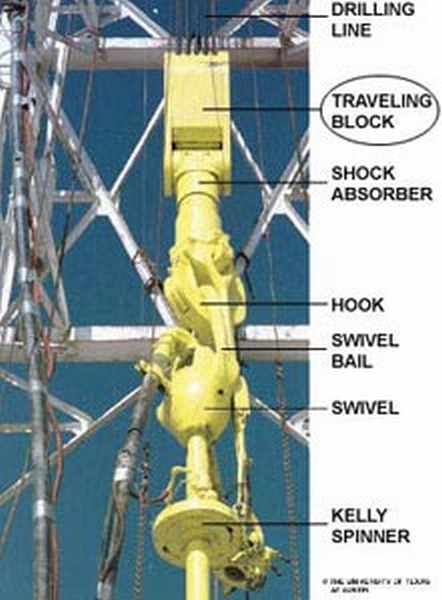

A traveling block is the freely moving section of a block and tackle that contains a set of pulleys or sheaves through which the drill line (wire rope) is threaded or reeved and is opposite (and under) the crown block (the stationary section).

The combination of the traveling block, crown block and wire rope drill line gives the ability to lift weights in the hundreds of thousands of pounds. On larger drilling rigs, when raising and lowering the derrick, line tensions over a million pounds are not unusual.

== See also ==
- List of components of oil drilling rigs
