= Rotary table (drilling rig) =

Mechanical device on a drilling rig that drives or locks the drill string

In this simple diagram of a drilling rig, #20 (in blue) is the rotary table. The kelly drive (#19) is inserted through the center of the rotary table and kelly bushings, and has free vertical (up & down) movement to allow downward force to be applied to the drill string, while the rotary table rotates it. (Note: Force is not actually applied from the top (as to push) but rather the weight is at the bottom of the drill string like a pendulum on a string.)

A rotary table is a mechanical device on a drilling rig that provides clockwise (as viewed from above) rotational force to the drill string to facilitate the process of drilling a borehole. Rotary speed is the number of times the rotary table makes one full revolution in one minute (rpm).

== Components ==
The rotary table is also called a turntable. Most rotary tables are chain driven. These chains resemble very large bicycle chains. The chains require constant oiling to prevent burning and seizing. Virtually all rotary tables are equipped with a rotary lock. Engaging the lock can either prevent the rotary from turning in one particular direction, or from turning at all. This is commonly used by crews in lieu of using a second pair of tongs to makeup or break out pipes. The rotary bushings are located at the center of the rotary table. These can generally be removed in two separate pieces to facilitate large items, e.g. drill bits, to pass through the rotary table. The large gap in the center of the rotary bushings is referred to as the "bowl" due to its appearance. The bowl is where the slips are set to hold up the drill string during connections and pipe trips as well as the point the drill string passes through the floor into the wellbore. The rotary bushings connect to the kelly bushings to actually induce the spin required for drilling.

== Alternatives ==
Most recently manufactured rigs no longer feature rotary drives. These newer rigs have opted for top drive technology. In top drive, the drill string is turned by mechanisms located in the top drive that is attached to the blocks. There is no need for the swivel because the top drive does all the necessary actions. The top drive eliminates the need for a kelly bar or kelly bushings.

== See also ==
- Drilling rig (petroleum) for a detailed description of the diagram.
