= Drill floor =

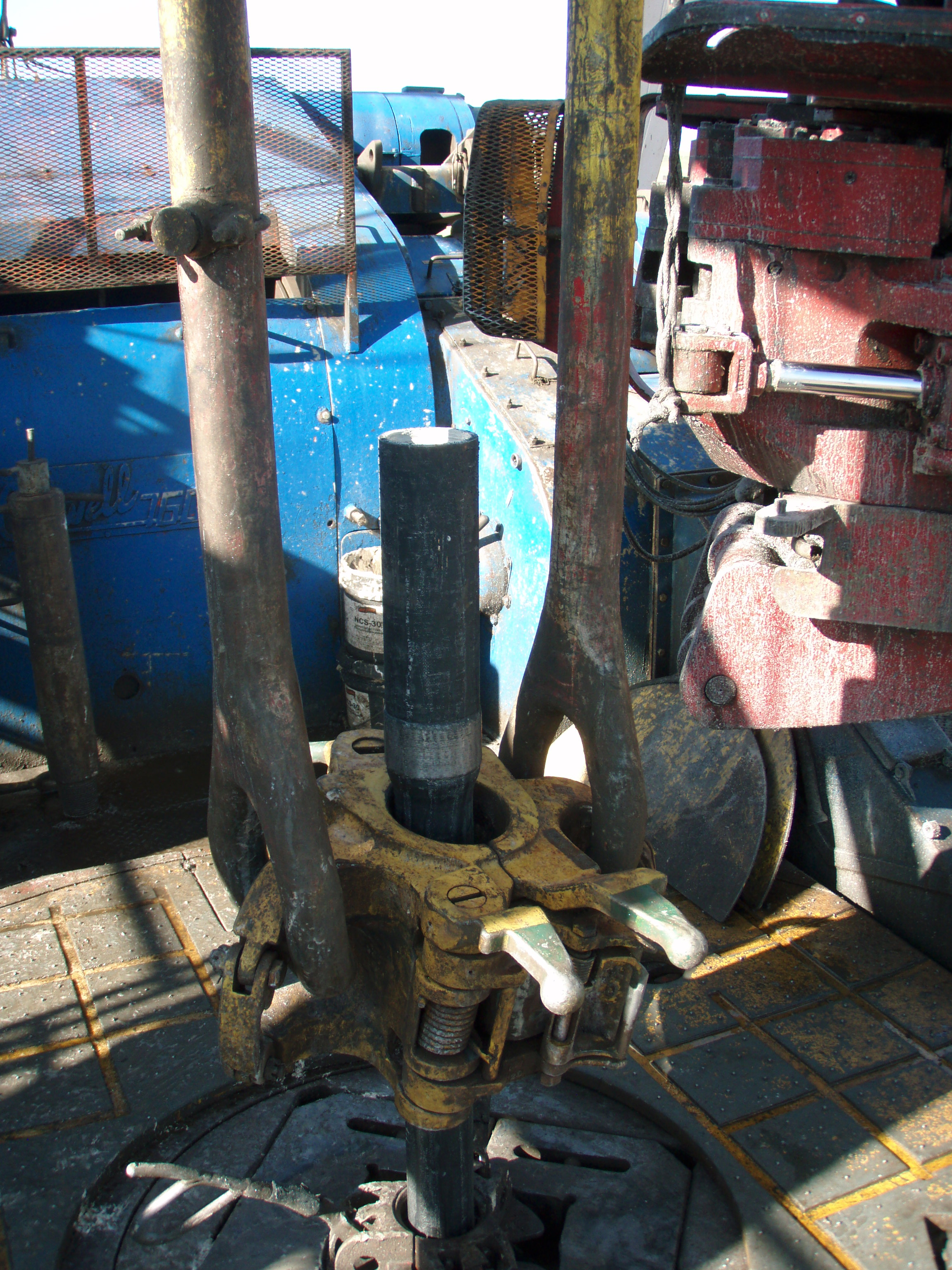
A joint being pulled out from the rotary table

The drill floor is the heart of any drilling rig. This is the area where the drill string begins its trip into the earth. It is traditionally where joints of pipe are assembled, as well as the BHA (bottom hole assembly), drilling bit, and various other tools. This is the primary work location for roughnecks and the driller. The drill floor is located directly under the derrick.

The floor is a relatively small work area in which the rig crew conducts operations, usually adding or removing drillpipe to, or from the drillstring. The rig floor is the most dangerous location on the rig because heavy iron is moved around there. Drill string connections are made or broken on the drill floor, and the driller's console for controlling the major components of the rig are located there. Attached to the rig floor is a small metal room, the doghouse, where the rig crew can meet, take breaks, and take refuge from the elements during idle times.

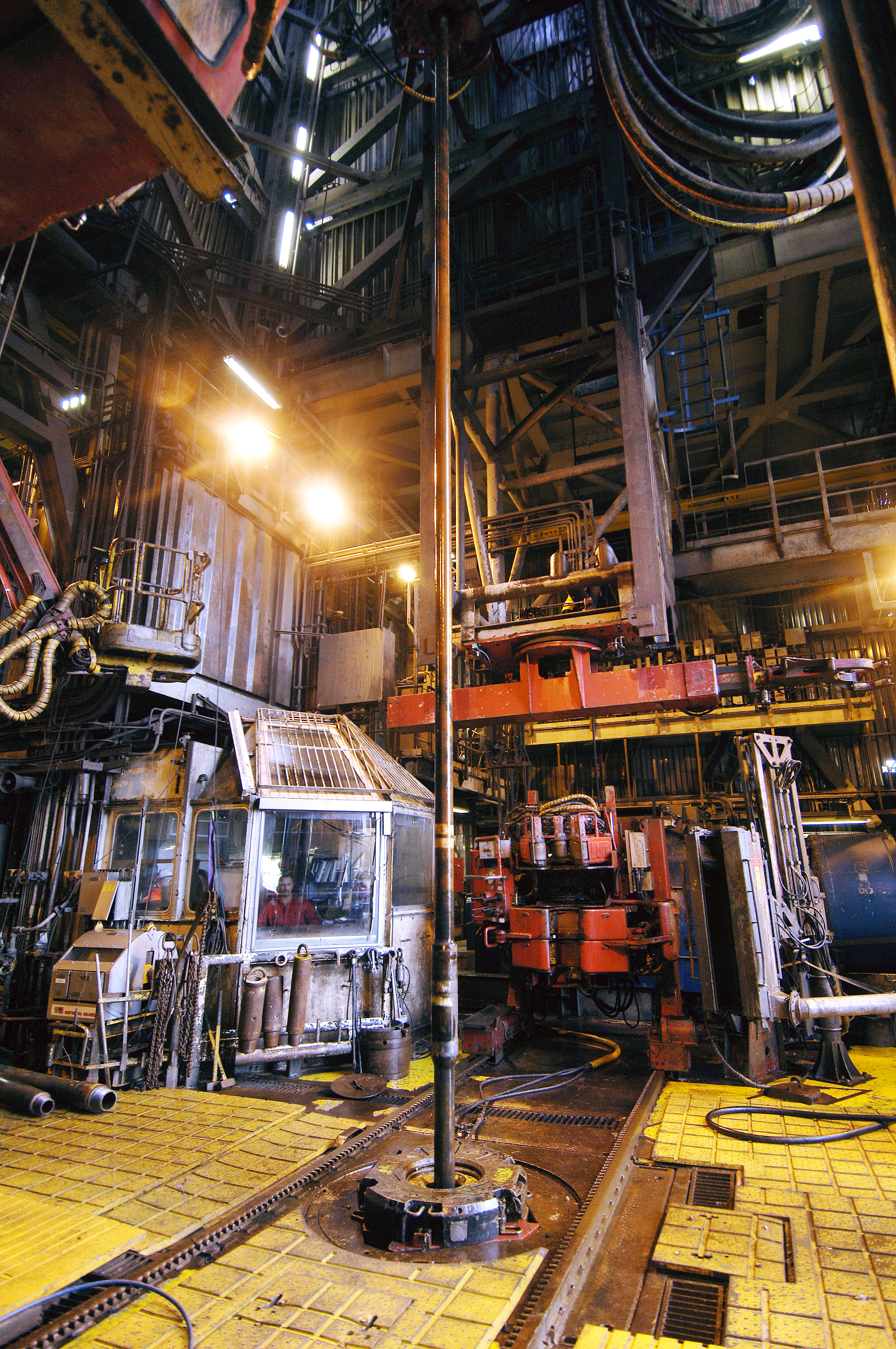
Drill floor with the drill pipe
