= Rig standpipe =

A rig standpipe is a solid metal pipe attached to the side of a drilling rig's derrick that is a part of its drilling mud system. It is used to conduct drilling fluid from the mud pumps to the kelly hose. Bull plugs, pressure transducers and valves are found on the rig standpipe.
