= Kelly drive =

Part of a drilling rig drive system

Simple diagram of a drilling rig and its basic operation. The kelly drive is #19

A kelly drive is a type of well drilling device on an oil or gas drilling rig that employs a section of pipe with a polygonal (three-, four-, six-, or eight-sided) or splined outer surface, which passes through the matching polygonal or splined kelly (mating) bushing and rotary table. This bushing is rotated via the rotary table and thus the pipe and the attached drill string turn while the polygonal pipe is free to slide vertically in the bushing as the bit digs the well deeper. When drilling, the drill bit is attached at the end of the drill string and thus the kelly drive provides the means to turn the bit (assuming that a downhole motor is not being used).

The kelly is the polygonal tubing and the kelly bushing is the mechanical device that turns the kelly when rotated by the rotary table. Together they are referred to as a kelly drive. The upper end of the kelly is screwed into the swivel, using a left-hand thread to preclude loosening from the right-hand torque applied below. The kelly is typically about 10 ft (3 m) longer than the drill pipe segments, thus leaving a portion of newly drilled hole open below the bit after a new length of pipe has been added ("making a connection") and the drill string has been lowered until the kelly bushing engages again in the rotary table.

The kelly hose is the flexible, high-pressure hose connected from the standpipe to a gooseneck pipe on a swivel above the kelly and allows the free vertical movement of the kelly while facilitating the flow of the drilling fluid down the drill string. It generally is of steel-reinforced rubber construction but also assemblies of Chiksan steel pipe and swivels are used.

The kelly is below the swivel. It is a pipe with either four or six flat sides. A rotary bushing fits around the flat sides to provide the torque needed to turn the kelly and the drill string. Rollers in the bushing permit the kelly free movement vertically while rotating. Since kelly threads would be difficult to replace, normally the lower end of the kelly has saver sub — or a short piece of pipe — that can be refurbished more cheaply than the kelly. Usually, a ball valve, called the lower kelly cock, is positioned between the kelly and the kelly saver sub. This valve is used for well control if the surface pressure becomes too high for the rotary hose or surface conditions.

According to the ″Dictionary of Petroleum Exploration, Drilling and Production″, ″[The] kelly was named after Michael J. (King) Kelly, a Chicago baseball player (1880-1887) who was known for his base running and long slides.″ As steel was not as good a quality back then as it was today, the kelly was always hanging up in the kelly bushing. There was a popular song for the famous baseball player at that time called, ″Slide Kelly, Slide!″ ″Sliding″ is the act of a kelly passing through the kelly bushing as it drills.

Alternatively, some say the name kelly is derived from the machine shop in which the first kelly was made. It was located in a town formerly named Kellysburg, Pennsylvania.

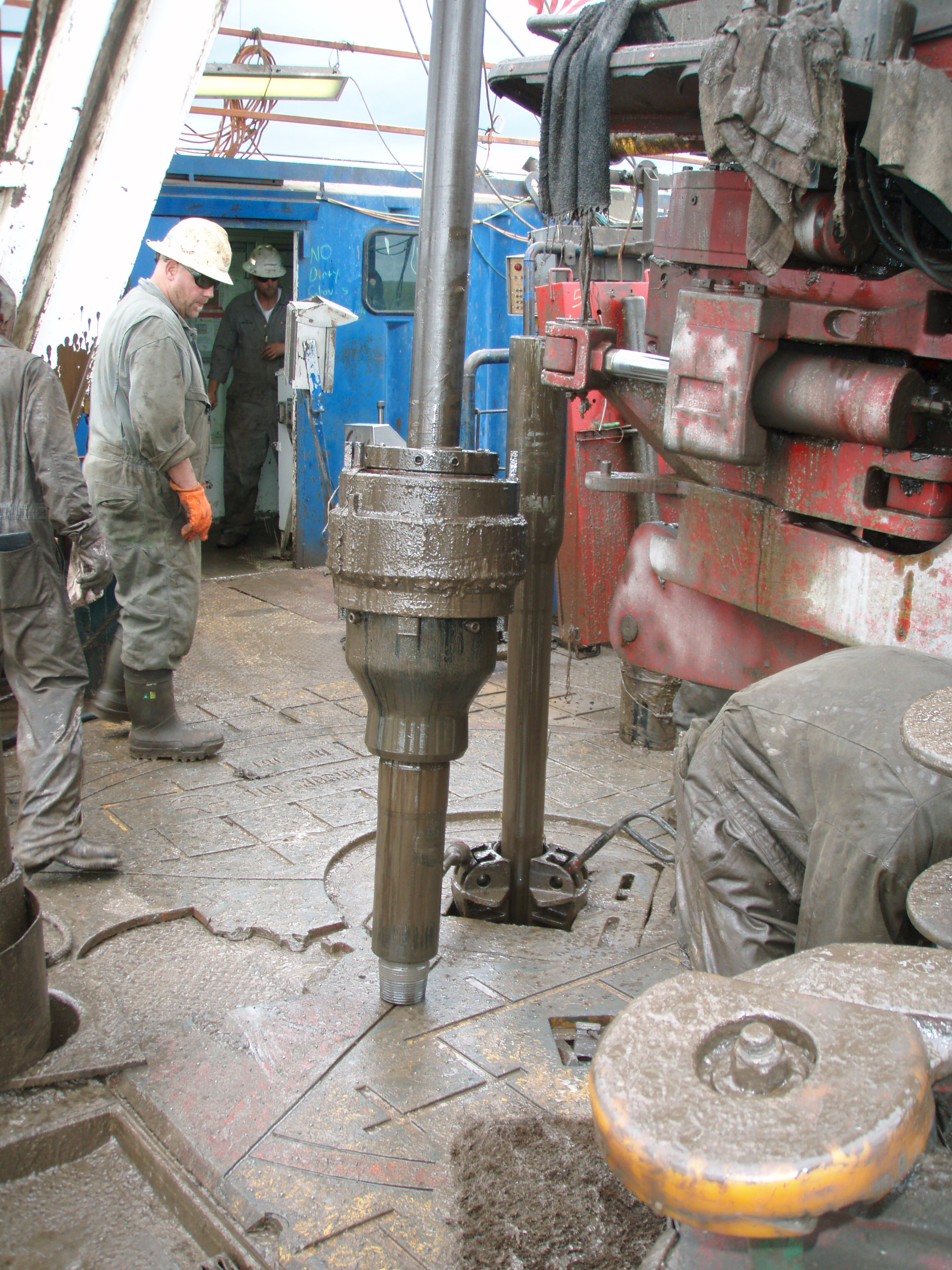
Kelly Bushing out - preparing to test the BOP
