= Drill pipe =

Piping used on drilling rigs

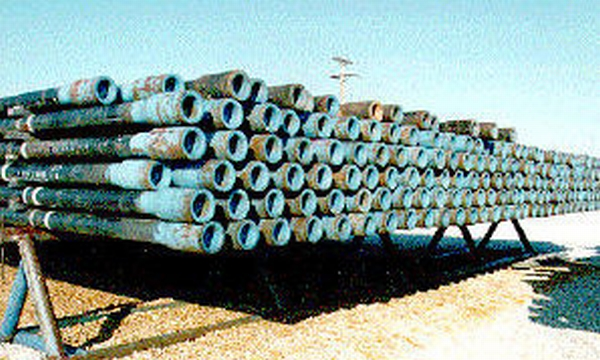

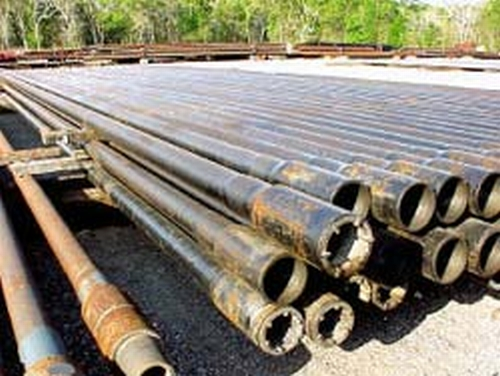

A drill pipe is a hollow, thin-walled, steel or aluminium alloy piping that is used on drilling rigs. It is hollow to allow drilling fluid to be pumped down the hole through the bit and back up the annulus. It comes in a variety of sizes, strengths, and wall thicknesses, but is typically 27 to 32 feet in length (Range 2). Longer lengths, up to 45 feet, exist (Range 3).

== Background ==
Drill stems must be designed to transfer drilling torque for combined lengths that often exceed several miles down into the Earth's crust, and also must be able to resist pressure differentials between inside and outside (or vice versa), and have sufficient strength to suspend the total weight of deeper components. For deep wells this requires tempered steel tubes that are expensive, and owners spend considerable efforts to reuse them after finishing a well.

A used drill stem is inspected on site, or off location. Ultrasonic testing and modified instruments similar to the spherometer are used at inspection sites to identify defects from metal fatigue, in order to preclude fracture of the drill stem during future wellboring. Drill pipe is most often considered premium class, which is 80% remaining body wall (RBW). After inspection determines that the RBW is below 80%, the pipe is considered to be Class 2 or "yellow band" pipe. Eventually the drill pipe will be graded as scrap and marked with a red band.

Drill pipe is a portion of the overall drill string. The drill string consists of both drill pipe and the bottom hole assembly (BHA), which is the tubular portion closest to the bit. The BHA will be made of thicker walled heavy weight drill pipe (HWDP) and drill collars, which have a larger outside diameter and provide weight to the drill bit and stiffness to the drilling assembly. Other BHA components can include a mud motor, measurement while drilling (MWD) apparatus, stabilizers, and various specialty downhole tools. The drill stem includes the entire drill string, plus the kelly that imparts rotation and torque to the drill pipe at the top.

== Manufacturing process ==
Modern drill pipe is made from the welding of at least three separate pieces: box tool joint, pin tool joint, and the tube. The green tubes are received by the drill pipe manufacturer from the steel mill. The ends of the tubes are then upset to increase the cross-sectional area of the ends. The tube end may be externally upset (EU), internally upset (IU), or internally and externally upset (IEU). Standard max upset dimensions are specified in API 5DP, but the exact dimensions of the upset are proprietary to the manufacturer. After upsetting, the tube then goes through a heat treating process. Drill pipe steel is commonly quenched and tempered to achieve high yield strengths (135 ksi is a common tube yield strength).

The tool joints (connectors) are also received by the manufacturer as green tubes. After a quench and temper heat treat, the tool joints are cut into box (female) and pin (male) threads. Tool joints are commonly 120 ksi Specified Minimum Yield Strength (SMYS), rather than the 135 ksi of the tube. They generally are stiffer than the tube, increasing the likelihood of fatigue failure at the junction. The lower SMYS on the connection increases the fatigue resistance. Higher strength steels are typically harder and more brittle, making them more susceptible to cracking and subsequent stress crack propagation.

Tubes and tool joints are welded using rotary inertia or direct drive friction welding. The tube is held stationary while the tool joint is revolved at high RPMs. The tool joint is then firmly pressed onto the upset end of the tube while the tool joint is rotating. The heat and force during this interaction weld the two together. Once the "ram horns" or excess material is removed, the weld line can only be seen under a microscope. Inertia friction welding is the traditional proven method. Direct drive friction welding is controlled and monitored up to 1,000 times a second, resulting in a fine quality weld that does not necessarily need a full heat treat quench and temper regime.
