= Annular velocity =

Annular velocity is the speed of the drilling fluid's movement in a column called an annulus in oil wells. It is commonly measured in feet per minute (ft/min) or meters per minute (m/min). Annular velocity is often abbreviated as AV, though this is not exclusively so, as AV also refers to apparent viscosity which is calculated from rheometer readings from tests that the mud engineer performs.

== Scope ==
For this article, annular velocity is described, as used in drilling fluid applications in the oil exploration industry. There may be other applications in other fields of study such as fluid mechanics (the study of the movement of fluid) or fluid dynamics (the study of the flow of fluid).

== Determination ==
The annular velocity can be calculated using one of the following formulas.

$$AV = \frac{1029.4(PO_{bpm})}{ID^2-OD^2}\,$$

Or

$$AV = \frac{24.5(PO_{gpm})}{ID^2-OD^2}\,$$

Where:

- AV = annular velocity in Ft/min (feet per minute)
- PO_{bpm} = pump output in bpm (barrels per minute) 1 barrel = 42 gallons
- PO_{gpm} = pump output in gpm (gallons per minute) 1 gallon = 0.0238095238 barrels
- ID^{2} = inside diameter of the wellbore or casing, squared
- OD^{2} = outside diameter of the drill pipe or tubing, squared
- 1029.4 = A conversion factor constant used to calculate the volume between the outside of a tube within the inside of another tube, using barrels.
- 24.5 = A conversion factor constant used to calculate the volume between the outside of a tube within the inside of another tube, using gallons.
- Pump Output = Refers to the measurement of the quantity of a fluid (to put that fluid in motion).

== Application ==
The annular velocity is one of two major variables in the process of cleaning solids (drill cuttings) from the wellbore. By maintaining the annular velocity at certain rates (speeds) in conjunction with the rheological properties of the drilling fluid, the wellbore is kept clean of the drill cuttings to prevent them from settling back down to the bottom and causing drilling problems.

The other major variable is the rheology of the drilling fluid. Rheology is sometimes thought of as viscosity to the uninitiated, though improperly. Viscosity (sometimes thought of as its thickness) is a very basic measurement of the fluids resistance to change in movement or flow. The viscosity of a fluid can be measured with a Marsh Funnel. Rheology is the study of viscosity and requires more precise and complicated procedures and equipment for its determination. For drilling fluid applications a rheometer is used.

== See also ==
- Petroleum Engineering
- Drilling rig
- Oilfield
- Oil well
- List of acronyms in oil and gas exploration and production
- List of oilfield service companies
- List of oil fields
- Natural gas field
