= Drilling formula sheets =

Drilling formulas used by engineers

Drilling Formula Sheets is a set of Drilling Formulas used commonly by drilling engineers in the onshore and offshore oil drilling industry. They are used as part of a key piece of engineering work called Well Control.

These formulas are part of the teachings of all well control schools and well engineering schools and for many years have been available from the American Petroleum Institute (API). .

In 2012 Skynet Labs Ltd, an Irish oil and gas software company took a set of common drilling formula used in the drilling profession in offshore and onshore oil and gas exploration and abstracted out a smart device app for iPhone and android.

There are approximately 5000 formulas that are used today in the drilling industry. These formulas are mainly to do with annular dynamics and fluid dynamics.
