= Mud engineer =

Field within oil and gas extraction

A mud engineer (correctly called a drilling fluids engineer, but most often referred to as the "mud man") works on an oil well or gas well drilling rig, and is responsible for ensuring the properties of the drilling fluid, also known as drilling mud, are within designed specifications.

== Use of mud ==
Mud is a vital part of drilling operations. It provides hydrostatic pressure on the borehole wall to prevent uncontrolled production of reservoir fluids, lubricates and cools the drill bit, carries the drill cuttings up to the surface, forms a "filter-cake" on the borehole wall to prevent drilling fluid invasion, provides an information medium for well logging, and helps the drilling by fracturing the rock from the jets in the bit. To fulfill these tasks effectively, the mud contains carefully chosen additives to control its chemical and rheological properties.

Drilling mud is usually a shear thinning non-Newtonian fluid of variable viscosity. When it is under more shear, such as in the pipe to the bit and through the bit nozzles, viscosity is lower which reduces pumping-power requirements. When returning to the surface through the much roomier annulus it is under less shear stress and becomes more viscous, and hence better able to carry the rock cuttings. Bentonite is commonly used as an additive to control and maintain viscosity, and also has the additional benefit of forming a mud-cake (also known as a filter cake) on the bore-hole wall, preventing fluid invasion.

Barite is commonly used to "weight" the mud to maintain adequate hydrostatic pressure down-hole. This is critical in a drilling operation to avoid a kick and ultimately a blowout from uncontrolled production of formation fluids. The "mud-pits" at the surface have their levels carefully monitored, since an increase in the mud level indicates a kick is taking place, and may require shutting in the well and circulating heavier weighted drilling mud to prevent further formation fluid or gas production.

Drilling fluid must be chemically compatible with the formations being drilled. Salinity must be chosen so as not to cause clay swelling or other problems. Mud can be "oil-based" or "water-based". In many areas oil-based muds are being phased out, as they are less environmentally friendly, although in some formations they are necessary because of chemical compatibility issues. Offshore rigs typically use synthetic oil based mud.

== The job ==
The mud engineer (or drilling fluids engineer) is usually a graduate of a university, college, or technical institute with a focus on chemical, mineral, or mining engineering. However, it is also possible to start with a high school diploma and work alongside a mud engineer, gradually gaining experience on the job and working one's way up to the mud engineer position. After several years as, for example, a drilling assistant, one can obtain the role by demonstrating sufficient expertise in math, physics, geology, chemistry, IT, and related fields. Large oil companies, such as Halliburton, operate mud schools. There are also privately run institutions, like the Oklahoma Mud School. The advantage of attending an oil company-run mud school is that the company is more likely to hire graduates directly.

Before the mid-1940s, the driller dealt with drilling mud; but specialization occurred with the increasing complexity and overlapped more with the geologist.

Prior to drilling a well, a "mud program" will be worked out according to the expected geology, in which products to be used, concentrations of those products, and fluid specifications at different depths are all predetermined. As the hole is drilled and gets deeper, more mud is required, and the mud engineer is responsible for making sure that the new mud to be added is made up to the required specifications. The chemical composition of the mud will be designed so as to stabilize the hole. It is sometimes necessary to completely change the mud to drill through a particular subsurface layer.

As drilling proceeds, the mud engineer will get information from other service providers such as the mud logger (mud logging technician) about progress through the geological zones, and will make regular physical and chemical checks on the drilling mud. In particular the Marsh funnel viscosity and the density are frequently checked. As drilling proceeds, the mud tends to accumulate small particles of the rocks which are being drilled through, and its properties change. It is the job of the mud engineer to specify additives to correct these changes, or to partially or wholly replace the mud when necessary. He or she must also keep an eye on the equipment which is used to pump the mud and to remove particles, and be prepared if the geologists' predictions are not entirely correct, or if other problems arise.

It is sometimes necessary to stabilize the wall of a borehole at a particular depth by pumping cement down through the mud system, and the mud engineer is sometimes in charge of this process.

The drilling fluids company may support the mud engineer with computer tools and manuals for addressing drilling-fluid problems, but the mud engineer remains responsible for decisions affecting drilling operations.

A mud engineer's job may involve long shifts of over 12 hours a day. Typical offshore and foreign work schedules are four weeks working and four weeks off.

== Important fluid properties ==
One of the most important mud properties is the mud weight (density). If the mud weight exceeds the fracture pressure of the formation, the formation may fracture and large quantities of mud are lost to it, in a situation referred to as lost circulation. These cracks can also cause water to seep into the well bore or into a hydrocarbon bearing zone, which would likely impede the ability of the formation to produce oil (or require the separation of large quantities of water).

Conversely, if the mud weight is too low it will have a hydrostatic pressure that is less than the formation pressure. This will cause pressurized fluid in the formation to flow into the wellbore and make its way to the surface. This is referred to as a formation "kick" and can lead to a potentially deadly blowout if the invading fluid reaches the surface uncontrolled.

Other important mud properties to be maintained are the YP (Yield Point) which determines the carrying capacity of the mud to carry the drill cuttings to the surface. Mud should be capable of forming a thin "mud cake" which forms a lining of the borehole walls.

== Drilling fluids companies ==
Drilling fluids operations are often contracted to service companies, a trend commonly observed in the oil industry for most of it operations. The largest four companies for mud services are M-I SWACO (A Schlumberger Company), Baroid Drilling Fluids (Halliburton Oilfield Services), Baker Hughes Drilling Fluids, and Weatherford International Drilling Fluids and Drilling Waste Management. There are, however, many smaller companies providing drilling fluid services as well. Independent companies can provide a localized knowledge, and quality services and mud products. ANA Industries Limited is also the largest independent drilling fluids company presently in West Africa

== See also ==
- Boring
- Derrickhand
- Drilling mud
- Drilling rig
- Marsh funnel
- Oil well
- Society of Petroleum Engineers
