= Oil-based mud =

Oil-based drilling fluid

Oil-based mud is a drilling fluid used in drilling engineering. It is composed of oil as the continuous phase and water as the dispersed phase in conjunction with emulsifiers, wetting agents and gellants. The oil base can be diesel, kerosene, fuel oil, selected crude oil or mineral oil.

== Requirements and composition ==
The requirements are a gravity of 36–37 API, a flash point of 180 °F (82 °C), fire point of 200 °F (93 °C) and an aniline point of 140 °F (60 °C).

Emulsifiers are important to oil-based mud due to the likelihood of contamination. The water phase of oil-based mud can be freshwater, or a solution of sodium or calcium chloride. The external phase is oil and does not allow the water to contact the formation. The shales don't become water wet.

Poor stability of the emulsion results in the two layers separating into two distinct layers.

== Advantages ==
The advantages are:

1. high drilling rates
2. lowered drill pipe torque and drag,
3. less bit balling and
4. reduction in differential sticking.

Oil-based muds are expensive, but are worth the cost when drilling through:

1. troublesome shales that would otherwise swell and disperse in water based mud e.g. smectite,
2. to drill deep, high-temperature holes that dehydrate water-based mud,
3. to drill water-soluble zones and
4. to drill producing zones.

== Disadvantages ==
The disadvantages of using oil-based mud, especially in wildcat wells are:

1. Inability to analyze oil shows in cuttings, because the oil-based mud has fluorescence confusing with the original oil formation.
2. Contamination samples of cuttings, cores, sidewall cores for geochemical analysis of TOC and masks the real determination of API gravity due to this contamination.
3. Contaminate areas of freshwater aquifers causing environmental damage.
4. Disposal of cuttings in an appropriate place to isolate possible environmental contamination.

== Uses ==
This mud type can be used as a completion and workover fluid, a spotting fluid to relieve a stuck pipe and as packer or casing fluid. They are very good for "Gumbo" shales. The mud weight can be controlled from 7–22 lbs/gal. It is sensitive to temperature but does not dehydrate as in the case of water based mud as mentioned before. It has no limit on the drilled solids concentration. The water phase should be maintained above a pH of 7. Stability of the emulsion depends on the alkaline value.
