= Marsh funnel =

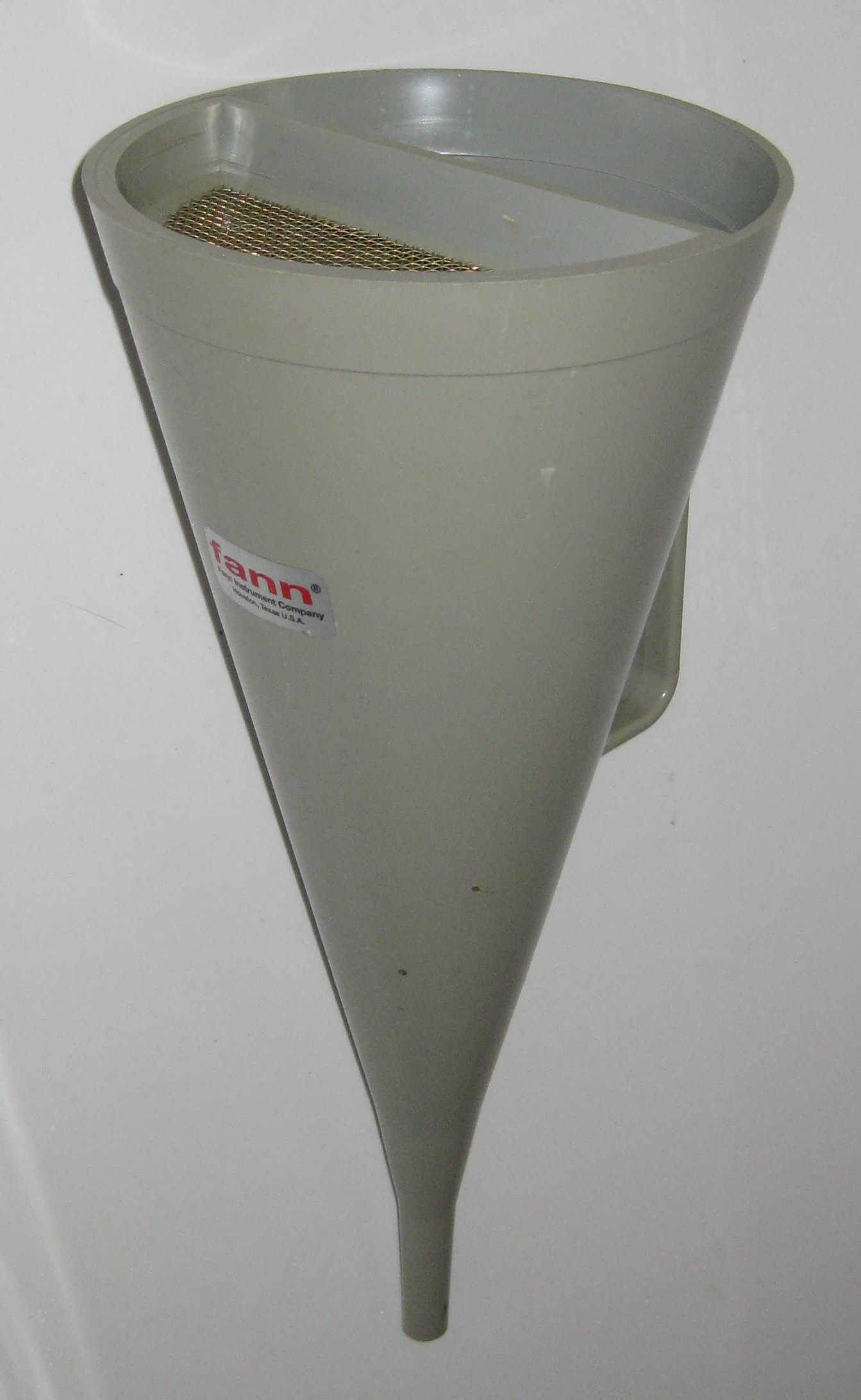
Marsh Funnel: plastic with brass flow tube and mesh

The Marsh funnel is a simple device for measuring viscosity by observing the time it takes a known volume of liquid to flow from a cone through a short tube. It is standardized for use by mud engineers to check the quality of drilling mud. Other cones with different geometries and orifice arrangements are called flow cones, but have the same operating principle.

In use, the funnel is held vertically with the end of the tube closed by a finger. The liquid to be measured is poured through the mesh to remove any particles which might block the tube. When the fluid level reaches the mesh, the amount inside is equal to the rated volume. To take the measurement, the finger is released as a stopclock is started, and the liquid is allowed to run into a measuring container. The time in seconds is recorded as a measure of the viscosity.

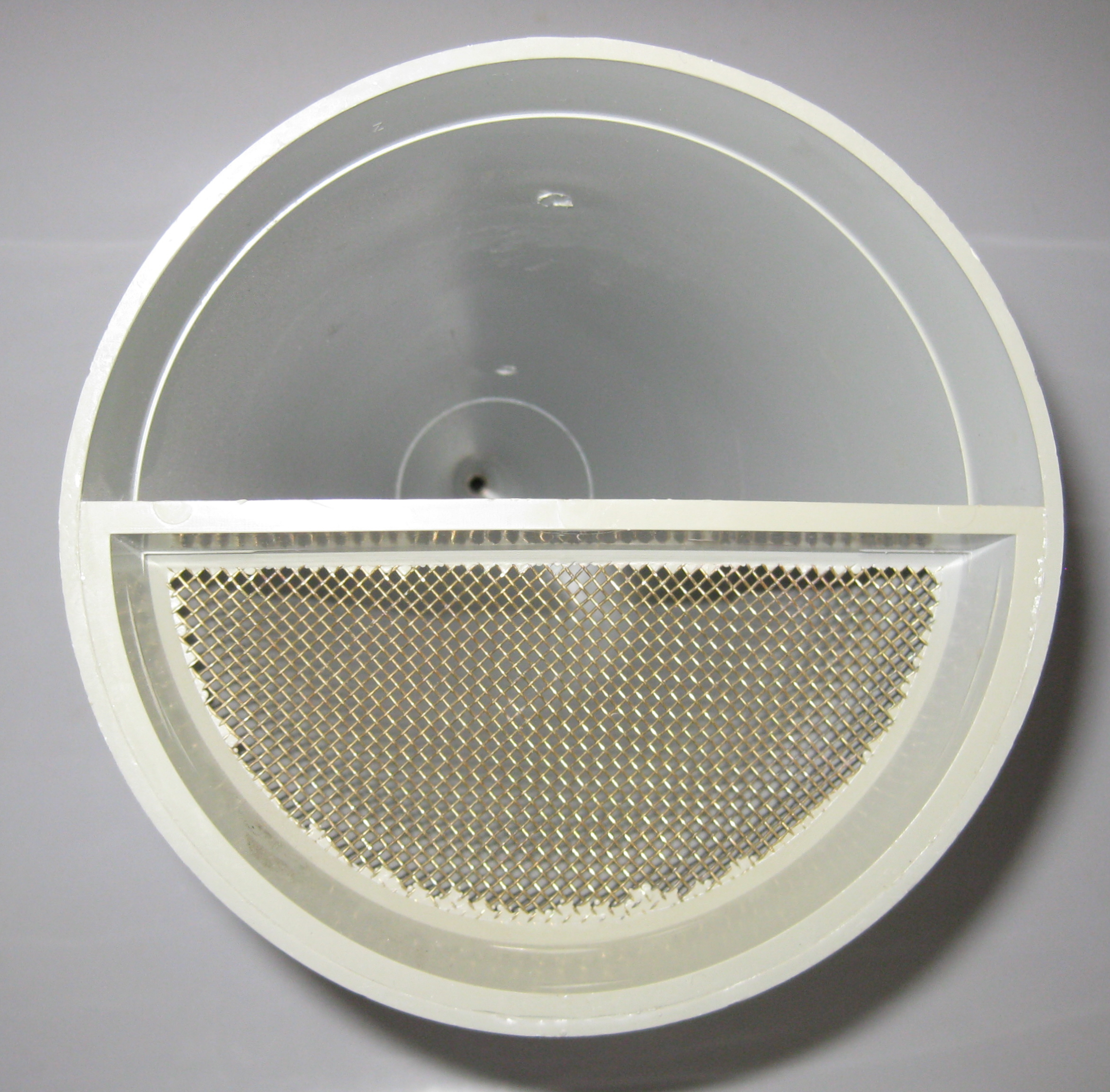
Marsh Funnel top view showing the mesh through which drilling fluid is poured to retain particles which would not pass through the orifice.

== The Marsh Funnel ==
Based on a method published in 1931 by H.N.Marsh, a Marsh cone is a flow cone with an aspect ratio of 2:1 and a working volume of at least a litre. A Marsh funnel is a Marsh cone with a particular orifice and a working volume of 1.5 litres. It consists of a cone 6 inches (152 mm) across and 12 inches in height (305 mm) to the apex of which is fixed a tube 2 inches (50.8 mm) long and 3/16 inch (4.76 mm) internal diameter. A 10-mesh screen is fixed near the top across half the cone.

In American practice (and most of the oil industry) the volume collected is a quart. If water is used, the time should be 26 +/- 0.5 seconds. If the time is less than this the tube is probably enlarged by erosion, if more it may be blocked or damaged, and the funnel should be replaced. In some companies, and Europe in particular, the volume collected is a litre, for which the water funnel time should be 28 seconds. Marsh himself collected 0.50 litre, for which the time was 18.5 seconds.

The Marsh funnel time is often referred to as the Marsh funnel viscosity, and represented by the abbreviation FV. The unit (seconds) is often omitted. Formally, the volume should also be stated. The (quart) Marsh funnel time for typical drilling muds is 34 to 50 seconds, though mud mixtures to cope with some geological conditions may have a time of 100 or more seconds.

While the most common use is for drilling muds, which are non-Newtonian fluids, the Marsh funnel is not a rheometer, because it only provides one measurement under one flow condition. However the effective viscosity can be determined from following simple formula.

μ = ρ (t - 25)

where μ = effective viscosity in centipoise
ρ = density in g/cm^{3}
t = quart funnel time in seconds

For example, a mud of funnel time 40 seconds and density 1.1 g/cm^{3} has an effective viscosity of about 16.5 cP. For the range of times of typical muds above, the shear rate in the Marsh funnel is about 2000 s^{−1}.

== Other Flow Cones ==
The term Marsh cone is also used in the concrete and oil industries. European standard EN445 and American standard C939 for measuring the flow properties of cement grout mixtures specify a funnel similar to the Marsh cone. Some manufacturers supply devices which they call Marsh cones, with removable tubes with size ranges from 5 to 15 mm. These can be used for quality control by selecting a tube which gives a convenient time, say 30 to 60 seconds.
