= Oil well control =

Management of oil wells

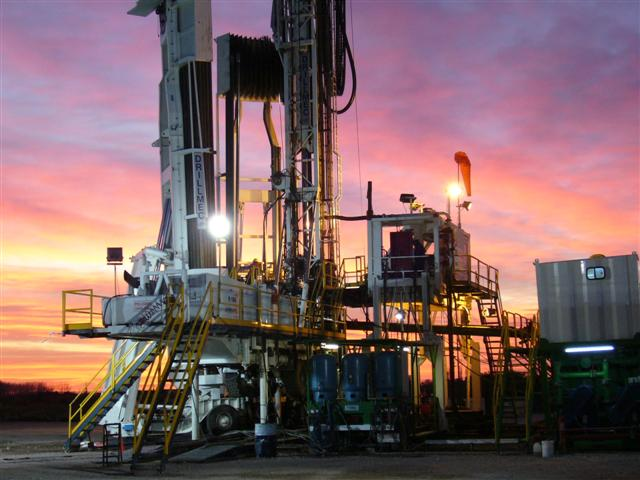
As technology has advanced, more modern drillers have better control of the overall well.

Oil well control is the management of the dangerous effects caused by the unexpected release of formation fluid, such as natural gas and/or crude oil, upon surface equipment of oil or gas drilling rigs and escaping into the atmosphere. Technically, oil well control involves preventing the formation gas or fluid (hydrocarbons), usually referred to as kick, from entering into the wellbore during drilling or well interventions.

Formation fluid can enter the wellbore if the pressure exerted by the column of drilling fluid is not great enough to overcome the pressure exerted by the fluids in the formation being drilled (pore pressure). Oil well control also includes monitoring a well for signs of impending influx of formation fluid into the wellbore during drilling and procedures, to stop the well from flowing when it happens by taking proper remedial actions.

Failure to manage and control these pressure effects can cause serious equipment damage and injury, or loss of life. Improperly managed well control situations can cause blowouts, which are uncontrolled and explosive expulsions of formation hydrocarbons from the well, potentially resulting in a fire.

== Importance of oil well control ==
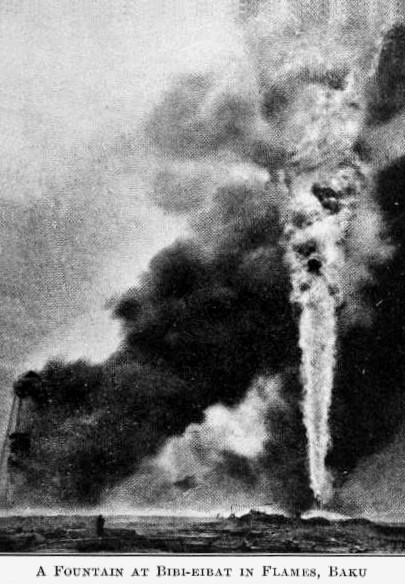
1904 oil well fire at Bibi-Eibat (near Baku, Azerbaijan).

Oil well control is one of the most important aspects of drilling operations. Improper handling of kicks in oil well control can result in blowouts with very grave consequences, including the loss of valuable resources and also lives of field personnel. Even though the cost of a blowout (as a result of improper/no oil well control) can easily reach several millions of US dollars, the monetary loss is not as serious as the other damages that can occur: irreparable damage to the environment, waste of valuable resources, ruined equipment, and most importantly, the safety and lives of personnel on the drilling rig.

In order to avert the consequences of blowout, the utmost attention must be given to oil well control. That is why oil well control procedures should be in place prior to the start of an abnormal situation noticed within the wellbore, and ideally when a new rig position is sited. In other words, this includes the time the new location is picked, all drilling, completion, workover, snubbing and any other drilling-related operations that should be executed with proper oil well control in mind. This type of preparation involves widespread training of personnel, the development of strict operational guidelines and the design of drilling programs – maximizing the probability of successfully regaining hydrostatic control of a well after a significant influx of formation fluid has taken place.

== Fundamental concepts and terminology ==
Pressure is a very important concept in the oil and gas industry. Pressure can be defined as: the force exerted per unit area. Its SI unit is newtons per square metre or pascals. Another unit, bar, is also widely used as a measure of pressure, with 1 bar equal to 100 kilopascals. Normally pressure is measured in the U.S. petroleum industry in units of pounds force per square inch of area, or psi. 1000 psi equals 6894.76 kilo-pascals.

=== Hydrostatic pressure ===
Hydrostatic pressure (HSP), as stated, is defined as pressure due to a column of fluid that is not moving. That is, a column of fluid that is static, or at rest, exerts pressure due to local force of gravity on the column of the fluid.

The formula for calculating hydrostatic pressure in SI units (N/m^{2}) is:

Hydrostatic pressure = Height (m) × Density (kg/m^{3}) × Gravity (m/s^{2}).

All fluids in a wellbore exert hydrostatic pressure, which is a function of density and vertical height of the fluid column. In US oil field units, hydrostatic pressure can be expressed as:

HSP = 0.052 × MW × TVD', where MW (Mud Weight or density) is the drilling-fluid density in pounds per gallon (ppg), TVD is the true vertical depth in feet and HSP is the hydrostatic pressure in psi.

The 0.052 is needed as the conversion factor to psi unit of HSP.

To convert these units to SI units, one can use:

- 1 ppg ≈ 119.8264273 kg/m^{3}
- 1 ft = 0.3048 metres
- 1 psi = 0.0689475729 bar
- 1 bar = 10^{5} pascals
- 1 bar = 15 psi

=== Pressure gradient ===
The pressure gradient is described as the pressure per unit length. Often in oil well control, pressure exerted by fluid is expressed in terms of its pressure gradient. The SI unit is pascals/metre. The hydrostatic pressure gradient can be written as:

Pressure gradient (psi/ft) = HSP/TVD = 0.052 × MW (ppg).

=== Formation pressure ===
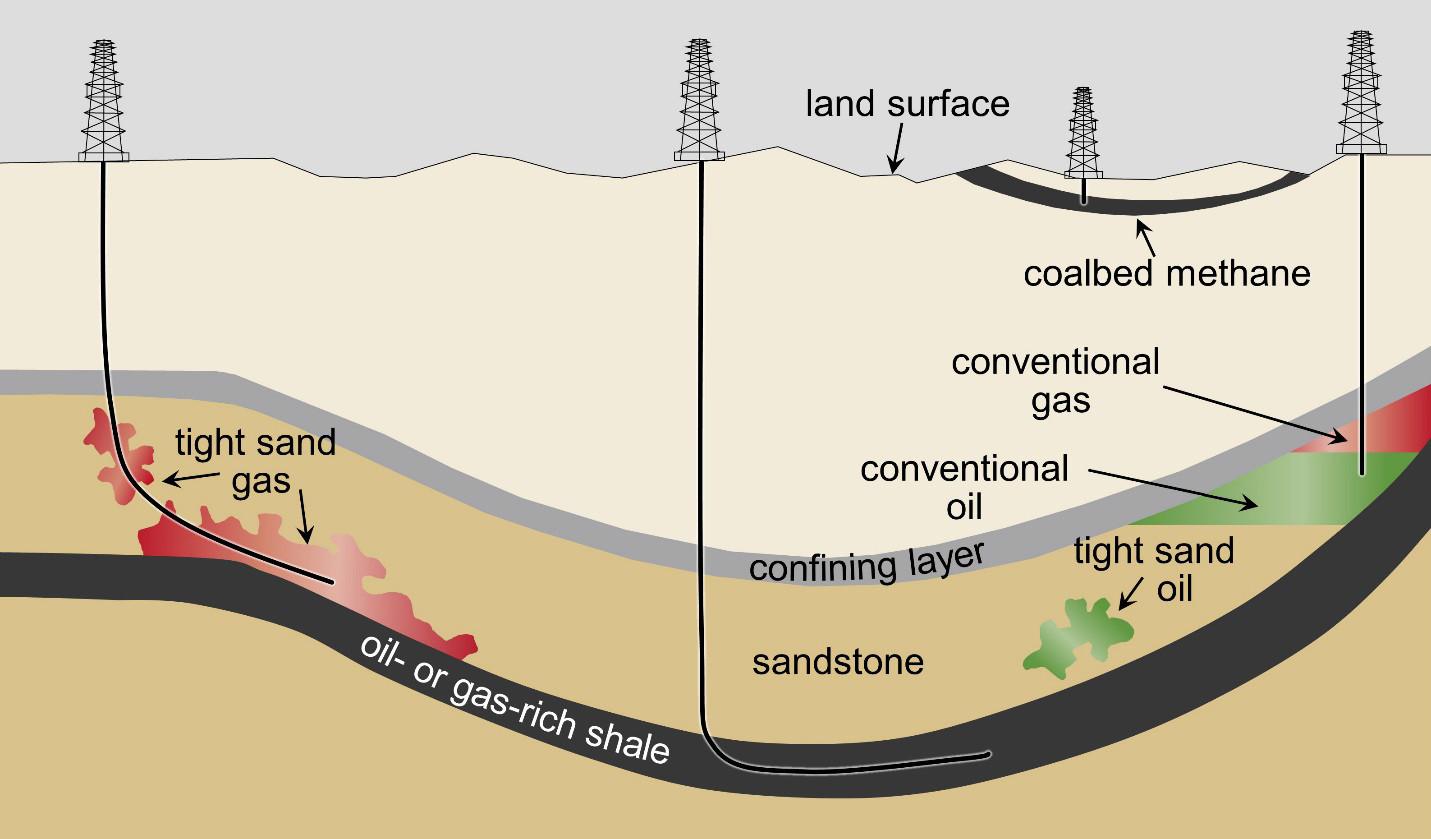
Schematic cross-section of general types of oil and gas resources and the orientations of production wells used in hydraulic fracturing.

Formation pressure is the pressure exerted by the formation fluids, which are the liquids and gases contained in the geologic formations encountered while drilling for oil or gas. It can also be said to be the pressure contained within the pores of the formation or reservoir being drilled. Formation pressure is a result of the hydrostatic pressure of the formation fluids, above the depth of interest, together with pressure trapped in the formation. Under formation pressure, there are 3 levels: normally pressured formation, abnormal formation pressure, or subnormal formation pressure.

Normally pressured formation

Normally pressured formation has a formation pressure that is the same with the hydrostatic pressure of the fluids above it. As the fluids above the formation are usually some form of water, this pressure can be defined as the pressure exerted by a column of water from the formation's depth to sea level.

The normal hydrostatic pressure gradient for freshwater is 0.433 pounds per square inch per foot (psi/ft), or 9.792 kilopascals per meter (kPa/m), and 0.465 psi/ft for water with dissolved solids like in Gulf Coast waters, or 10.516 kPa/m. The density of formation water in saline or marine environments, such as along the Gulf Coast, is about 9.0 ppg or 1078.43 kg/m^{3}. Since this is the highest for both Gulf Coast water and fresh water, a normally pressured formation can be controlled with a 9.0 ppg mud.

Sometimes the weight of the overburden, which refers to the rocks and fluids above the formation, will tend to compact the formation, resulting in pressure built-up within the formation if the fluids are trapped in place. The formation in this case will retain its normal pressure only if there is a communication with the surface. Otherwise, an abnormal formation pressure will result.

Abnormal formation pressure

As discussed above, once the fluids are trapped within the formation and not allow to escape there is a pressure build-up leading to abnormally high formation pressures. This will generally require a mud weight of greater than 9.0 ppg to control. Excess pressure, called "overpressure" or "geopressure", can cause a well to blow out or become uncontrollable during drilling.

Subnormal formation pressure

Subnormal formation pressure is a formation pressure that is less than the normal pressure for the given depth. It is common in formations that had undergone production of original hydrocarbon or formation fluid in them.

=== Overburden pressure ===
Overburden pressure is the pressure exerted by the weight of the rocks and contained fluids above the zone of interest. Overburden pressure varies in different regions and formations. It is the force that tends to compact a formation vertically. The density of these usual ranges of rocks is about 18 to 22 ppg (2,157 to 2,636 kg/m^{3}). This range of densities will generate an overburden pressure gradient of about 1 psi/ft (22.7 kPa/m). Usually, the 1 psi/ft is not applicable for shallow marine sediments or massive salt. In offshore however, there is a lighter column of sea water, and the column of underwater rock does not go all the way to the surface. Therefore, a lower overburden pressure is usually generated at an offshore depth, than would be found at the same depth on land.

Mathematically, overburden pressure can be derived as:

$$S=\rho_b\times D \times g$$

where

g = acceleration due to gravity
$S$ = overburden pressure
$\rho_b$ = average formation bulk density
$D$ = vertical thickness of the overlying sediments

The bulk density of the sediment is a function of rock matrix density, porosity within the confines of the pore spaces, and porefluid density. This can be expressed as

$$\rho_b = \phi \rho_f + (1 - \phi) \rho_m$$

where

$\phi$ = rock porosity
$\rho_f$ = formation fluid density
$\rho_m$ = rock matrix density

=== Fracture pressure ===
Fracture pressure can be defined as pressure required to cause a formation to fail or split. As the name implies, it is the pressure that causes the formation to fracture and the circulating fluid to be lost. Fracture pressure is usually expressed as a gradient, with the common units being psi/ft (kPa/m) or ppg (kg/m^{3}).

To fracture a formation, three things are generally needed, which are:

1. Pump into the formation. This will require a pressure in the wellbore greater than formation pressure.
2. The pressure in the wellbore must also exceed the rock matrix strength.
3. And finally the wellbore pressure must be greater than one of the three principal stresses in the formation.

=== Pump pressure (system pressure losses) ===
Pump pressure, which is also referred to as system pressure loss, is the sum total of all the pressure losses from the oil well surface equipment, the drill pipe, the drill collar, the drill bit, and annular friction losses around the drill collar and drill pipe. It measures the system pressure loss at the start of the circulating system and measures the total friction pressure.

=== Slow pump pressure (SPP) ===
Slow pump pressure is the circulating pressure (pressure used to pump fluid through the whole active fluid system, including the borehole and all the surface tanks that constitute the primary system during drilling) at a reduced rate. SPP is very important during a well kill operation in which circulation (a process in which drilling fluid is circulated out of the suction pit, down the drill pipe and drill collars, out the bit, up the annulus, and back to the pits while drilling proceeds) is done at a reduced rate to allow better control of circulating pressures and to enable the mud properties (density and viscosity) to be kept at desired values. The slow pump pressure can also be referred to as "kill rate pressure" or "slow circulating pressure" or "kill speed pressure" and so on.

=== Shut-in drill pipe pressure ===
Shut-in drill pipe pressure (SIDPP), which is recorded when a well is shut in on a kick, is a measure of the difference between the pressure at the bottom of the hole and the hydrostatic pressure (HSP) in the drillpipe. During a well shut-in, the pressure of the wellbore stabilizes, and the formation pressure equals the pressure at the bottom of the hole. The drillpipe at this time should be full of known-density fluid. Therefore, the formation pressure can be easily calculated using the SIDPP. This means that the SIDPP gives a direct of formation pressure during a kick.

=== Shut-in casing pressure (SICP) ===
The shut-in casing pressure (SICP) is a measure of the difference between the formation pressure and the HSP in the annulus when a kick occurs.

The pressures encountered in the annulus can be estimated using the following mathematical equation:

FP = HSP_{mud} + HSP_{influx} + SICP

where

FP = formation pressure (psi)
HSP_{mud} = Hydrostatic pressure of the mud in the annulus (psi)
HSP_{influx} = Hydrostatic pressure of the influx (psi)
SICP = shut-in casing pressure (psi)

=== Bottom-hole pressure (BHP) ===
Bottom-hole pressure (BHP) is the pressure at the bottom of a well. The pressure is usually measured at the bottom of the hole. This pressure may be calculated in a static, fluid-filled wellbore with the equation:

BHP = D × ρ × C,

where

BHP = bottom-hole pressure
D = the vertical depth of the well
ρ = density
C = units conversion factor
(or, in the English system, BHP = D × MWD × 0.052).

In Canada the formula is depth in meters x density in kgs x the constant gravity factor (0.00981), which will give the hydrostatic pressure of the well bore or (hp) hp=bhp with pumps off.

The bottom-hole pressure is dependent on the following:

- Hydrostatic pressure (HSP)
- Shut-in surface pressure (SIP)
- Friction pressure
- Surge pressure (occurs when transient pressure increases the bottom-hole pressure)
- Swab pressure (occurs when transient pressure reduces the bottom-hole pressure)

Therefore, BHP can be said to be the sum of all pressures at the bottom of the wellhole, which equals:

BHP = HSP + SIP + friction + Surge - swab

== Basic calculations in oil well control ==
There are some basic calculations that need to be carried during oil well control. A few of these essential calculations will be discussed below. Most of the units here are in US oil field units, but these units can be converted to their SI units equivalent by using this Conversion of units link.

=== Capacity ===
The capacity of drill string is an essential issue in oil well control. The capacity of drillpipe, drill collars or hole is the volume of fluid that can be contained within them.

The capacity formula is as shown below:

Capacity = ID^{2}/1029.4

where

Capacity = Volume in barrels per foot(bbl/ft)
ID = Inside diameter in inches
1029.4 = Units conversion factor

Also the total pipe or hole volume is given by :

Volume in barrels (bbls) = Capacity (bbl/ft) × length (ft)

Feet of pipe occupied by a given volume is given by:

Feet of pipe (ft) = Volume of mud (bbls) / Capacity (bbls/ft)

Capacity calculation is important in oil well control due to the following:

- Volume of the drillpipe and the drill collars must be pumped to get kill weight mud to the bit during kill operation.
- It is used to spot pills and plugs at various depths in the wellbore.

=== Annular capacity ===
This is the volume contained between the inside diameter of the hole and the outside diameter of the pipe. Annular capacity is given by:

Annular capacity (bbl/ft) = (ID_{hole}^{2} - OD_{pipe}^{2}) / 1029.4

where

ID_{hole}^{2} = Inside diameter of the casing or open hole in inches
OD_{pipe}^{2} = Outside diameter of the pipe in inches

Similarly,

Annular volume (bbls) = Annular capacity (bbl/ft) × length (ft)

and

Feet occupied by volume of mud in annulus = Volume of mud (bbls) / Annular Capacity (bbls/ft).

=== Fluid level drop ===
Fluid level drop is the distance the mud level will drop when a dry string(a bit that is not plugged) is being pulled from the wellbore and it is given by:

Fluid level drop = Bbl disp / (CSG cap + Pipe disp)

or

Fluid level drop = Bbl disp / (Ann cap + Pipe cap)

and the resulting loss of HSP is given by:

Lost HSP = 0.052 × MW × Fluid drop

where

Fluid drop = distance the fluid falls (ft)
Bbl disp = displacement of the pulled pipe (bbl)
CSG cap = casing capacity (bbl/ft)
Pipe disp = pipe displacement (bbl/ft)
Ann cap = Annular capacity between casing and pipe (bbl/ft)
Pipe cap = pipe capacity
Lost HSP = Lost hydrostatic pressure (psi)
MW = mud weight (ppg)

When pulling a wet string (the bit is plugged) and the fluid from the drillpipe is not returned to the hole. The fluid drop is then changed to the following:

Fluid level drop = Bbl disp / Ann cap

=== Kill Mud weight (KMW) ===
Kill Mud weight is the density of the mud required to balance formation pressure during kill operation. The Kill Weight Mud can be calculated by:

KWM = SIDPP/(0.052 × TVD) + OWM

where

KWM = kill weight mud (ppg)
SIDPP = shut-in drillpipe pressure (psi)
TVD = true vertical depth (ft)
OWM = original weight mud (ppg)

But when the formation pressure can be determined from data sources such as bottom hole pressure, then KWM can be calculated as follows:

KWM = FP / (0.052 × TVD)

where FP = Formation pressure.

== Kicks ==
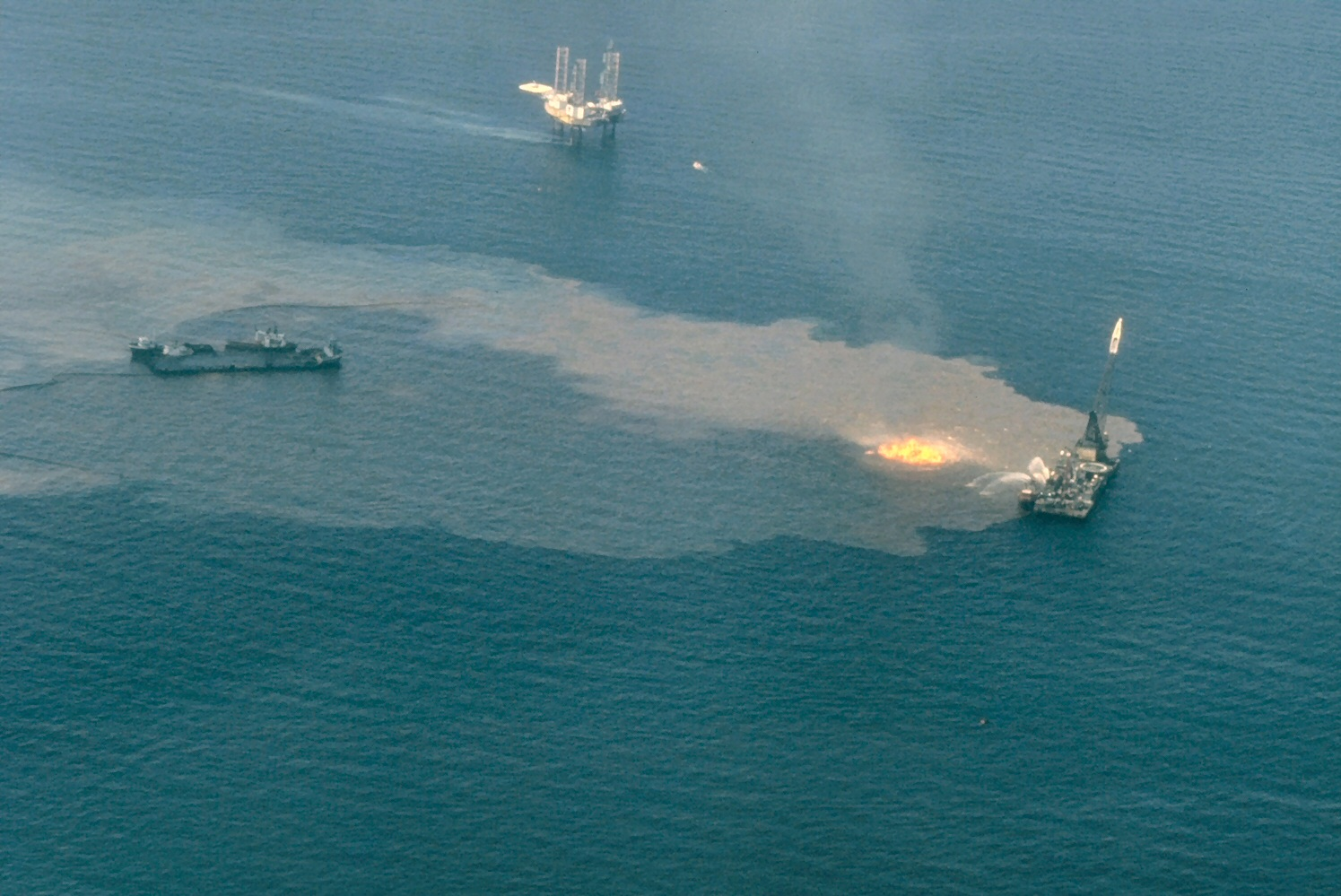
Ixtoc I oil well blowout

Kick is the entry of formation fluid into the wellbore during drilling operations. It occurs because the pressure exerted by the column of drilling fluid is not great enough to overcome the pressure exerted by the fluids in the formation drilled. The whole essence of oil well control is to prevent kick from occurring and if it happens to prevent it from developing into blowout. An uncontrolled kick usually results from not deploying the proper equipment, using poor practices, or a lack of training of the rig crews. Loss of oil well control may lead into blowout, which represents one of the most severe threats associated with the exploration of petroleum resources involving the risk of lives and environmental and economic consequences.

=== Causes of kicks ===
A kick will occur when the bottom hole pressure(BHP) of a well falls below the formation pressure and the formation fluid flows into the wellbore. There are usually causes for kicks some of which are:

- Failure to keep the hole full during a trip
- Swabbing while tripping
- Lost circulation
- Insufficient density of fluid
- Abnormal pressure
- Drilling into an adjacent well
- Lost control during drill stem test
- Improper fill on trips

==== Failure to keep the hole full during a trip ====
Tripping is the complete operation of removing the drillstring from the wellbore and running it back in the hole. This operation is typically undertaken when the bit (which is the tool used to crush or cut rock during drilling) becomes dull or broken, and no longer drills the rock efficiently. A typical drilling operation of deep oil or gas wells may require up to 8 or more trips of the drill string to replace a dull rotary bit for one well.

Tripping out of the hole means that the entire volume of steel (of drillstring) is being removed, or has been removed, from the well. This displacement of the drill string (the steel) will leave out a volume of space that must be replaced with an equal volume of mud. If the replacement is not done, the fluid level in the wellbore will drop, resulting in a loss of hydrostatic pressure (HSP) and bottom hole pressure (BHP). If this bottom hole pressure reduction goes below the formation pressure, a kick will definitely occur.

==== Swabbing while tripping ====
Swabbing occurs when bottom hole pressure is reduced due to the effects of pulling the drill string upward in the bored hole. During the tripping out of the hole, the space formed by the drillpipe, drill collar, or tubing (which are being removed) must be replaced by something, usually mud. If the rate of tripping out is greater than the rate the mud is being pumped into the void space (created by the removal of the drill string), then swab will occur. If the reduction in bottom hole pressure caused by swabbing is below formation pressure, then a kick will occur.

==== Lost circulation ====
Lost circulation usually occurs when the hydrostatic pressure fractures an open formation. When this occurs, there is loss in circulation, and the height of the fluid column decreases, leading to lower HSP in the wellbore. A kick can occur if steps are not taken to keep the hole full. Lost circulation can be caused by:

- excessive mud weights
- excessive annular friction loss
- excessive surge pressure during trips, or "spudding" the bit
- excessive shut-in pressures.

==== Insufficient density of fluid ====
If the density of the drilling fluid or mud in the well bore is not sufficient to keep the formation pressure in check, then a kick can occur. Insufficient density of the drilling fluid can be as a result of the following :

- attempting to drill by using an underbalanced weight solution
- excessive dilution of the mud
- heavy rains in the pits
- barite settling in the pits
- spotting low density pills in the well.

==== Abnormal pressure ====
Another cause of kicks is drilling accidentally into abnormally-pressured permeable zones. The increased formation pressure may be greater than the bottom hole pressure, resulting in a kick.

==== Drilling into an adjacent well ====
Drilling into an adjacent well is a potential problem, particularly in offshore drilling where a large number of directional wells are drilled from the same platform. If the drilling well penetrates the production string of a previously completed well, the formation fluid from the completed well will enter the wellbore of the drilling well, causing a kick. If this occurs at a shallow depth, it is an extremely dangerous situation and could easily result in an uncontrolled blowout with little to no warning of the event.

==== Lost control during drill stem test ====
A drill-stem test is performed by setting a packer above the formation to be tested, and allowing the formation to flow. During the course of the test, the bore hole or casing below the packer, and at least a portion of the drill pipe or tubing, is filled with formation fluid. At the conclusion of the test, this fluid must be removed by proper well control techniques to return the well to a safe condition. Failure to follow the correct procedures to kill the well could lead to a blowout.

==== Improper fill on trips ====
Improper fill on trip occurs when the volume of drilling fluid to keep the hole full on a Trip (complete operation of removing the drillstring from the wellbore and running it back in the hole) is less than that calculated or less than Trip Book Record. This condition is usually caused by formation fluid entering the wellbore due to the swabbing action of the drill string, and, if action is not taken soon, the well will enter a kick state.

=== Kick warning signs ===
Deepwater Horizon drilling rig blowout, 21 April 2010

In oil well control, a kick should be able to be detected promptly, and if a kick is detected, proper kick prevention operations must be taken immediately to avoid a blowout. There are various tell-tale signs that signal an alert crew that a kick is about to start. Knowing these signs will keep a kicking oil well under control, and avoid a blowout:

==== Sudden increase in drilling rate ====
A sudden increase in penetration rate (drilling break) is usually caused by a change in the type of formation being drilled. However, it may also signal an increase in formation pore pressure, which may indicate a possible kick.

==== Increase in annulus flow rate ====
If the rate at which the pumps are running is held constant, then the flow from the annulus should be constant. If the annulus flow increases without a corresponding change in pumping rate, the additional flow is caused by formation fluid(s) feeding into the well bore or gas expansion. This will indicate an impending kick.

==== Gain in pit volume ====
If there is an unexplained increase in the volume of surface mud in the pit (a large tank that holds drilling fluid on the rig), it could signify an impending kick. This is because as the formation fluid feeds into the wellbore, it causes more drilling fluid to flow from the annulus than is pumped down the drill string, thus the volume of fluid in the pit(s) increases.

==== Change in pump speed/pressure ====
A decrease in pump pressure or increase in pump speed can happen as a result of a decrease in hydrostatic pressure of the annulus as the formation fluids enters the wellbore. As the lighter formation fluid flows into the wellbore, the hydrostatic pressure exerted by the annular column of fluid decreases, and the drilling fluid in the drill pipe tends to U-tube into the annulus. When this occurs, the pump pressure will drop, and the pump speed will increase. The lower pump pressure and increase in pump speed symptoms can also be indicative of a hole in the drill string, commonly referred to as a washout. Until a confirmation can be made whether a washout or a well kick has occurred, a kick should be assumed.

== Categories of oil well control ==
There are basically three types of oil well control which are: primary oil well control, secondary oil well control, and tertiary oil well control. Those types are explained below.

=== Primary oil well control ===
Primary oil well control is the process which maintains a hydrostatic pressure in the wellbore greater than the pressure of the fluids in the formation being drilled, but less than formation fracture pressure. It uses the mud weight to provide sufficient pressure to prevent an influx of formation fluid into the wellbore. If hydrostatic pressure is less than formation pressure, then formation fluids will enter the wellbore. If the hydrostatic pressure of the fluid in the wellbore exceeds the fracture pressure of the formation, then the fluid in the well could be lost into the formation. In an extreme case of lost circulation, the formation pressure may exceed hydrostatic pressure, allowing formation fluids to enter into the well.

=== Secondary oil well control ===
Secondary oil well control is done after the Primary oil well control has failed to prevent formation fluids from entering the wellbore. This process uses "blow out preventer", a BOP, to prevent the escape of wellbore fluids from the well. As the rams and choke of the BOP remain closed, a pressure built up test is carried out and a kill mud weight calculated and pumped inside the well to kill the kick and circulate it out.

=== Tertiary (or shearing) oil well control ===
Tertiary oil well control describes the third line of defense, where the formation cannot be controlled by primary or secondary well control (hydrostatic and equipment). This happens in underground blowout situations. The following are examples of tertiary well control:

- Drill a relief well to hit an adjacent well that is flowing and kill the well with heavy mud
- Rapid pumping of heavy mud to control the well with equivalent circulating density
- Pump barite or heavy weighting agents to plug the wellbore in order to stop flowing
- Pump cement to plug the wellbore

== Shut-in procedures ==
Using shut-in procedures is one of the oil-well-control measures to curtail kicks and prevent a blowout from occurring. Shut-in procedures are specific procedures for closing a well in case of a kick. When any positive indication of a kick is observed, such as a sudden increase in flow, or an increase in pit level, then the well should be shut-in immediately. If a well shut-in is not done promptly, a blowout is likely to happen.

Shut-in procedures are usually developed and practiced for every rig activity, such as drilling, tripping, logging, running tubular, performing a drill stem test, and so on. The primary purpose of a specific shut-in procedure is to minimize kick volume entering into a wellbore when a kick occurs, regardless of what phase of rig activity is occurring. However, a shut-in procedure is a company-specific procedure, and the policy of a company will dictate how a well should be shut-in.

They are generally two type of Shut-in procedures which are soft shut-in or hard shut-in. Of these two methods, the hard shut-in is the fastest method to shut in the well; therefore, it will minimize the volume of kick allowed into the wellbore.

== Well kill procedures ==
Source: A well kill procedure is an oil well control method. Once the well has been shut-in on a kick, proper kill procedures must be done immediately. The general idea in well kill procedure is to circulate out any formation fluid already in the wellbore during kick, and then circulate a satisfactory weight of kill mud called Kill Weight Mud (KWM) into the well without allowing further fluid into the hole. If this can be done, then once the kill mud has been fully circulated around the well, it is possible to open up the well and restart normal operations. Generally, a kill weight mud (KWM) mix, which provides just hydrostatic balance for formation pressure, is circulated. This allows approximately constant bottom hole pressure, which is slightly greater than formation pressure to be maintained, as the kill circulation proceeds because of the additional small circulating friction pressure loss. After circulation, the well is opened up again.

The major well kill procedures used in oil well control are listed below:

- Wait and weight
- Driller method
- Circulate and weight
- Concurrent method
- Reverse circulation
- Dynamic kill procedure
- Bullheading
- Volumetric method
- Lubricate and bleed

== Oil well control incidents root causes ==
There will always be potential oil well control problems, as long as there are drilling operations anywhere in the world. Most of these well control problems are as a result of some errors and can be eliminated, even though some are actually unavoidable. Since we know the consequences of failed well control are severe, efforts should be made to prevent some human errors which are the root causes of these incidents. These causes include:

- Lack of knowledge and skills of rig personnel
- Improper work practices
- Lack of understanding of oil well control training
- Lack of application of policies, procedures, and standards
- Inadequate risk management

== Organizations for building well-control culture ==
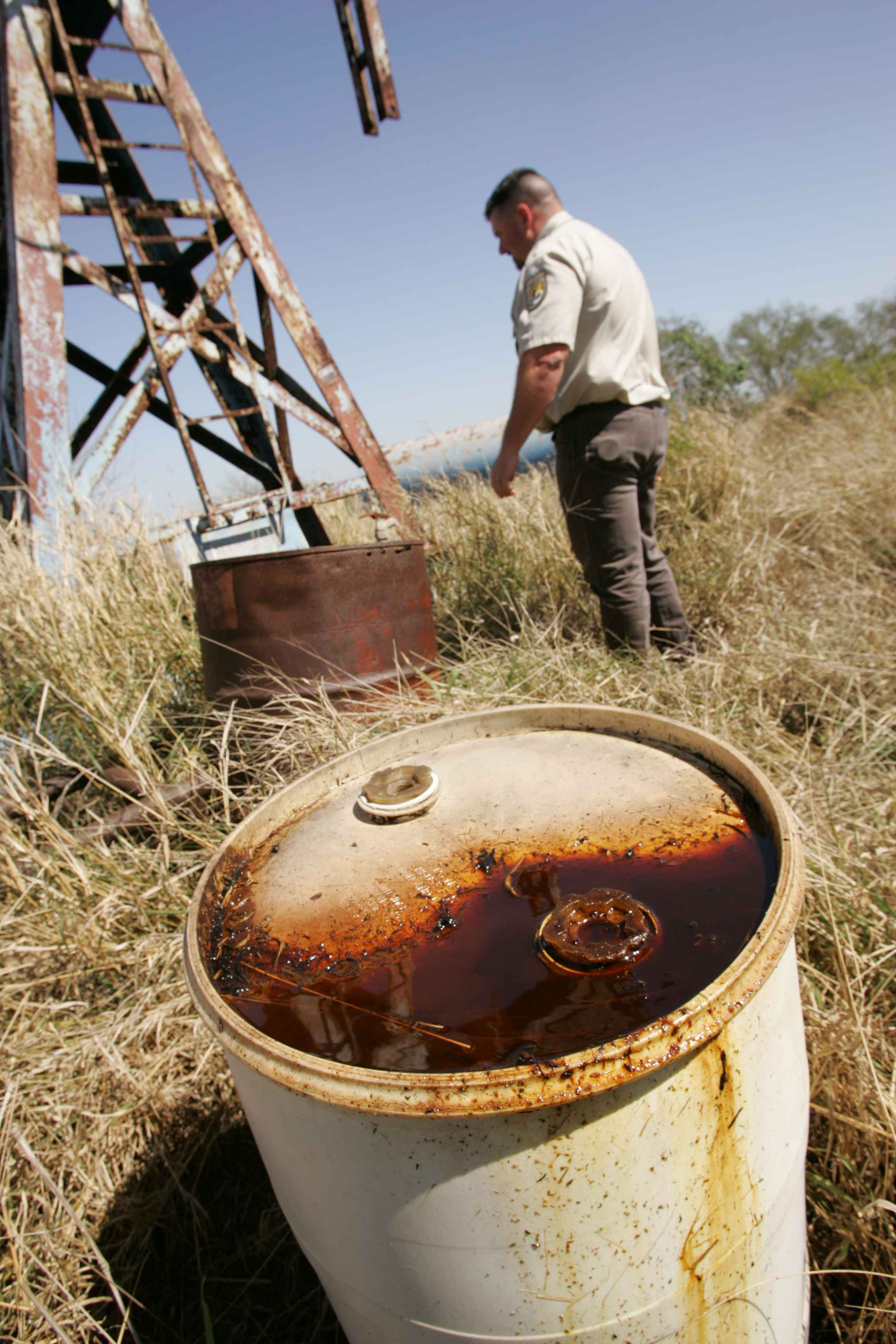
Planning for the control of the well throughout the entire life cycle is crucial for the proper management of resources.

An effective oil-well-control culture can be established within a company by requiring well control training of all rig workers, by assessing well control competence at the rigsite, and by supporting qualified personnel in carrying out safe well control practices during the drilling process. Such a culture also requires personnel involved in oil well control to commit to following the right procedures at the right time. Clearly communicated policies and procedures, credible training, competence assurance, and management support can minimize and mitigate well control incidents. An effective well control culture is built upon technically competent personnel who are also trained and skilled in crew resource management (a discipline within human factors), which comprises situation awareness, decision-making (problem-solving), communication, teamwork, and leadership. Training programs are developed and accredited by organizations such as the International Association of Drilling Contractors (IADC) and International Well Control Forum (IWCF).

IADC, headquartered in Houston, TX, is a nonprofit industry association that accredits well control training through a program called WellSharp, which is aimed at providing the necessary knowledge and practical skills critical to successful well control. This training comprises drilling and well servicing activities, as well as course levels applicable to everyone involved in supporting or conducting drilling operations—from the office support staff to the floorhands and drillers and up to the most-experienced supervisory personnel. Training such as those included in the WellSharp program and the courses offered by IWCF contribute to the competence of personnel, but true competence can be assessed only at the jobsite during operations. Therefore, IADC also accredits industry competence assurance programs to help ensure quality and consistency of the competence assurance process for drilling operations. IADC has regional offices all over the world and accredits companies worldwide. IWCF is an NGO, headquartered in Europe, whose main aim is to develop and administer well-control certification programs for personnel employed in oil-well drilling and for workover and well-intervention operations.

== See also ==
- Blowout (well drilling)
- Drilling formula sheets
- Formation fluid
- Oil well
- Oil well fire
