= Differential sticking =

Mechanical problem during well drilling

A diagram showing forces at work during differential sticking. The small black arrows represent pressure exerted on the drill pipe from the wellbore, the red arrows represent pressure exerted on the pipe from the formation (smaller than in the wellbore) and the large black arrow represents the net force on the pipe, which is pushing it into the wall.

Differential sticking is a problem that occurs when drilling a well with a greater well bore pressure than formation pressure, as is usually the case. The drill pipe is pressed against the wellbore wall so that part of its circumference will see only reservoir pressure, while the rest will continue to be pushed by wellbore pressure. As a result, the pipe becomes stuck to the wall, and can require millions of pounds of force to remove, which may prove impossible. In many cases the drilling fluid (mud) weight is reduced, thus relieving the pressure difference and releasing the stuck pipe string. Should this option be unavailable, as in sour gas wells, a specialty fishing company is called to retrieve the stuck pipe or 'fish'. Many options exist once a fishing company is on site: oil or nitrogen may be pumped down the well, or the fish may be 'washed over' using a carbide shoe on a string of washpipe. Jarring is not usually attempted with differential sticking due to the massive amount of pressure that holds the pipe in place.
