= Agitator =

Agitator may refer to:

== Politics ==
- A person who carries out political agitation; see agitation
- A member of the Agitators, political movement and elected representatives of soldiers during the English Civil War
- Levellers, also called Agitators, in English history, representatives for the New Model Army in the Putney Debates
- Agitator (newspaper), a syndicalist newspaper published in Home, Washington, USA from 1910 to 1912

== Other ==
- Agitator (device), a mechanism to put something into motion by shaking or stirring
  - Mud agitator
  - Industrial agitator
- Agitator (film), a 2001 Japanese film
- Agitator (hockey), a type of ice-hockey player, also known as a pest, who specializes in annoying or distracting opposing players
- The Agitator, a 1945 British drama film
- The Agitators: The Story of Susan B. Anthony and Frederick Douglass, 2017 play and 2020 podcast

== See also ==
- Agitation (disambiguation)
- Silent agitators
