= Mud Gas Separator =

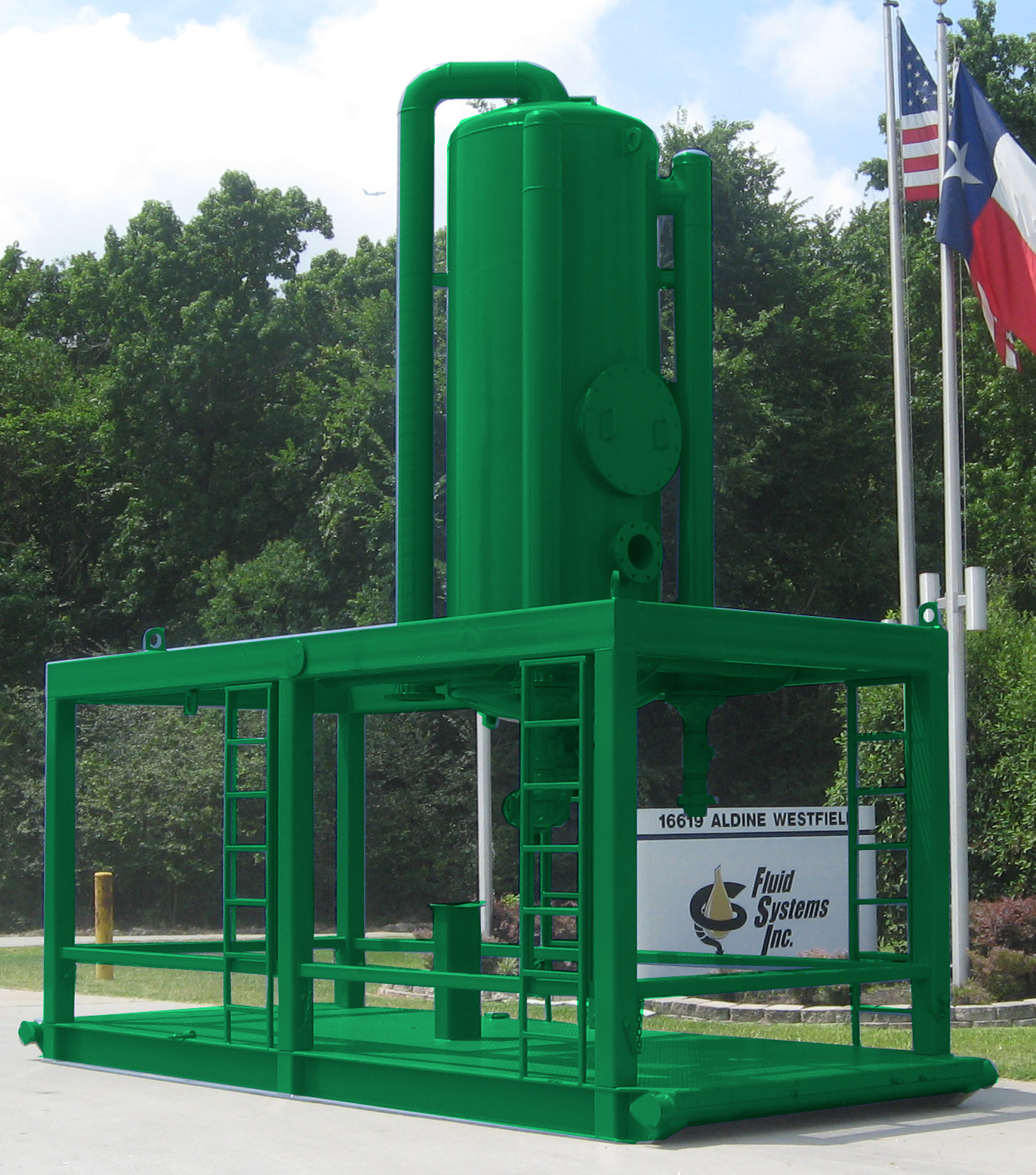
Mud Gas Separator capable of handling 1000-1500gpm

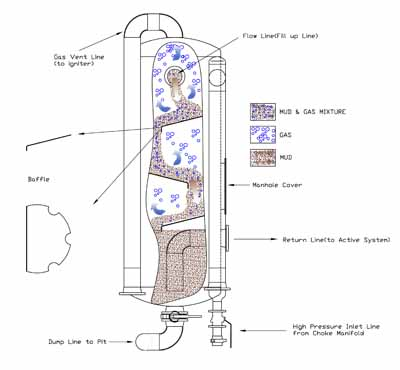
Process Flow Diagram For Mud Gas Separator

Mud Gas Separator is commonly called a gas-buster or poor boy degasser. It captures and separates the large volumes of free gas within the drilling fluid. If there is a "kick" situation, this vessel separates the mud and the gas by allowing it to flow over baffle plates. The gas then is forced to flow through a line, venting to a flare. A "kick" situation happens when the annular hydrostatic pressure in a drilling well temporarily (and usually relatively suddenly) falls below that of the formation, or pore, pressure in a permeable section downhole, and before control of the situation is lost.

It is always safe to design the mud/gas separator that will handle the maximum possible gas flow that can occur.

== Types of Mud/Gas Separators ==
The principle of mud/gas separation for different types of vessels is the same.

- Closed bottom type
- Open bottom type
- Float type

The closed-bottom separator, as the name implies, is closed at the vessel bottom with the mud return line directed back to the mud tanks. Commonly called the poor boy, the open-bottom mud gas separator is typically mounted on a mud tank or trip tank with the bottom of the separator body submerged in the mud. Fluid level (mud leg) is maintained in a float-type mud gas separator by a float/valve configuration. The float opens and closes a valve on the mud return line to maintain the mud-leg level. According to pedestal or base type there are:

- Fixed type
- Elevating type

Poor boy degassers are usually named according to the vessel diameter. Types include:

- MGS800
- MGS1000
- MGS1200
- MGS1400

The degasser type or configuration is typically customisable.

== Principle of operation ==
The principle behind the mud gas separator is relatively simple. On the figure, the mud and gas mixture is fed at the inlet allowing it to impinge on a series of baffles designed to separate gas and mud. The free gas then is moved into the flare line to reduce the threat of toxic and hazardous gases and the mud then discharges to the shale shaker and to the tank.

== See also ==
- Mud systems
