= Desander =

Equipment that separate sand and silt from the drilling fluids

Desanders and desilters are solid control equipment with a set of hydrocyclones that separate sand and silt from the drilling fluids in drilling rigs. Desanders are installed on top of the mud tank following the shale shaker and the degasser, but before the desilter. The desander removes the abrasive solids from the drilling fluids which cannot be removed by shakers. Normally, the solid diameters for desanders to separate would be 45~74μm, and 15~44μm for desilters.

A centrifugal pump is used to pump the drilling fluids from the mud tank into the set of hydrocyclones.

== Solids control ==
Desanders have no moving parts. The larger the internal diameter of the desander is, the greater the amount of drilling fluids it is able to process, and the larger the size of the solids removed. A desander with a 10 inches (250 mm) cone is able to remove 50% of solids within the 40-50μm range at a flow rate of 500 US gallons per minute (32 L/s), while a desilter with a 4 inches (100 mm) cone is able to remove 50% of solids within the 15-20μm range at a flow rate of 60 US gallons per minute (3.8 L/s). Micro-fine separators are able to remove 50% of solids within the 10-15μm range at a flow rate of 15 US gallons per minute (0.95 L/s). A desander is typically positioned next-to-last in the arrangement of solids control equipment, with a desander centrifuge as the subsequent processing unit. Desanders are preceded by gas busters, gumbo removal equipment (if utilized), shale shakers, mud cleaners (if utilized), and a vacuum degasser. Desanders are widely used in oilfield drilling. Practice has proved that hydrocyclone desanders are economic and effective equipment.

== See also ==
- Drilling rig with a diagram.
- Silt fence
- Silt
