= Christmas with the Dead =

Christmas with the Dead may refer to:

- Christmas with the Dead (short story), a short story by Joe R. Lansdale
- Christmas with the Dead (film), a film based on the short story
