= Mud systems =

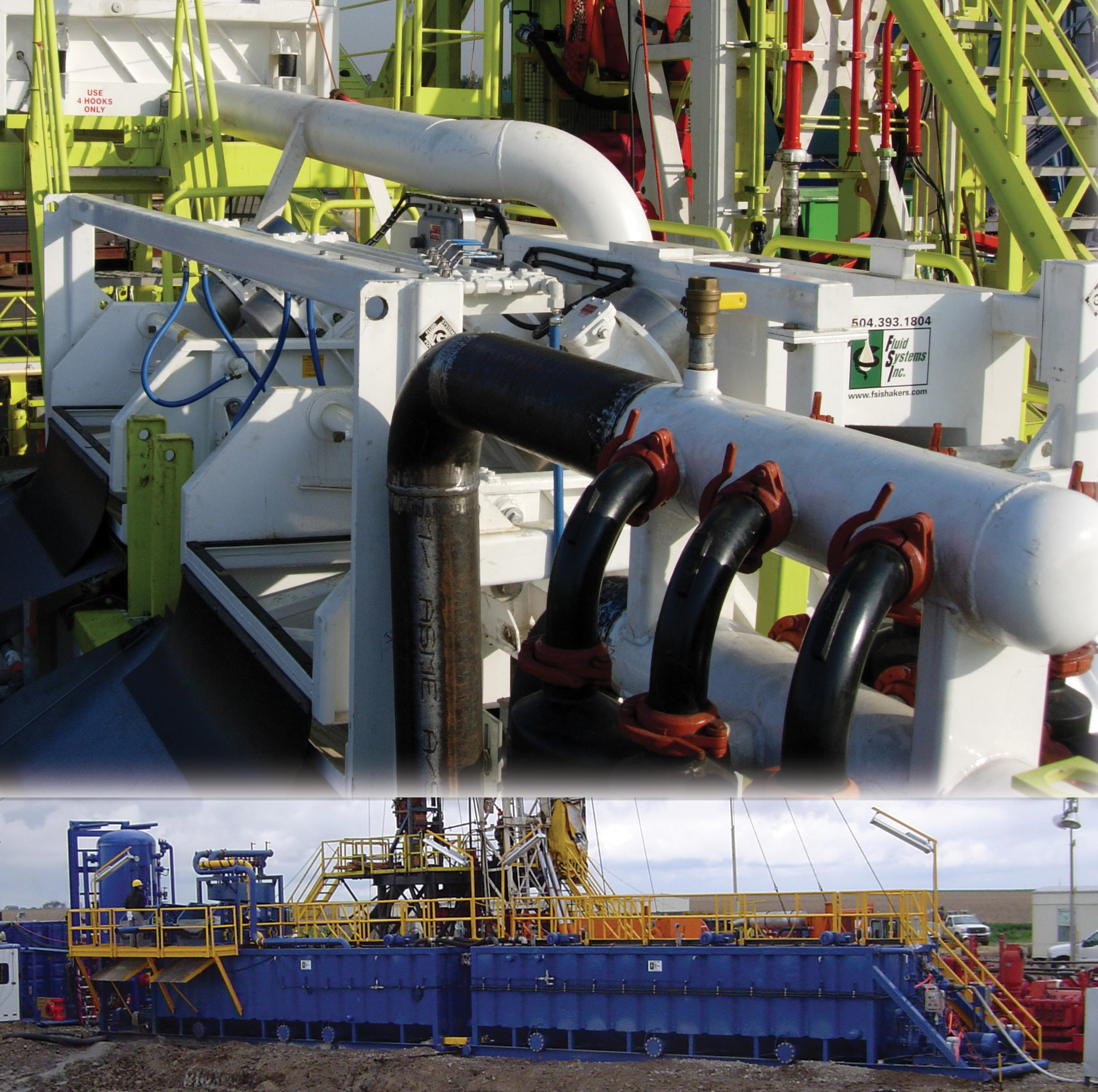
Surface mud systems

In the oil drilling industry, effective solids control can be attributed to the overall performance of all the components of the mud systems. Conditioning the drilling fluid with the goal of dramatically lowering maintenance cost, avoiding excessive chemical treatment and maintaining mud systems volume will decrease the chance of equipment failure, unnecessary high mud costs, hole and drilling problems.

In the early oil industry open earthen pits were used as settling area to separate solids and mud thereby acting as a solids control equipment. Now, with the stringent environmental regulations and high mud costs, the economics of an effective mud system come into consideration. Different solids control companies introduce zero-discharge systems, closed-loop systems, "quick move" technology, screening technology, disposal options etc.

== Sections of surface mud systems ==
1. Removal Section. Separation of undesirable drilled solids and even gas occurs in this section.
2. Addition Section. Commercial chemicals are being added and agitated to control and condition the mud.
3. Suction and Testing Section. This is the last part of the mud systems wherein the evaluation and testing procedures are conducted before re-circulating the fluid to downhole.

== Major components ==
- Mud gas separator
- Shale shakers
- Sand Trap
- Desander
- Desilter
- Degasser
- Mud cleaner
- Decanting centrifuge
- Mud agitator
- Tanks/Compartments
- Mud Guns
- Mixing Hopper
- Centrifugal Pumps
- Mud Pumps
- Others:

Screw Conveyor
Mud Ditch
Trip Tank
Water Tanks
Atmospheric Degasser
Cutting Driers

== Notes ==
=== Manufacturers ===
- Tri-Flo International –
- NRG Manufacturing –
- Task Environmental Services Worldwide BV –
- Drilling Fluid Equipment –
- OGEM Equipment –
- FP Marangoni –
- ITE GmbH –
- NGM –
