= Derrickhand =

Person who sits atop the derrick on a drilling rig

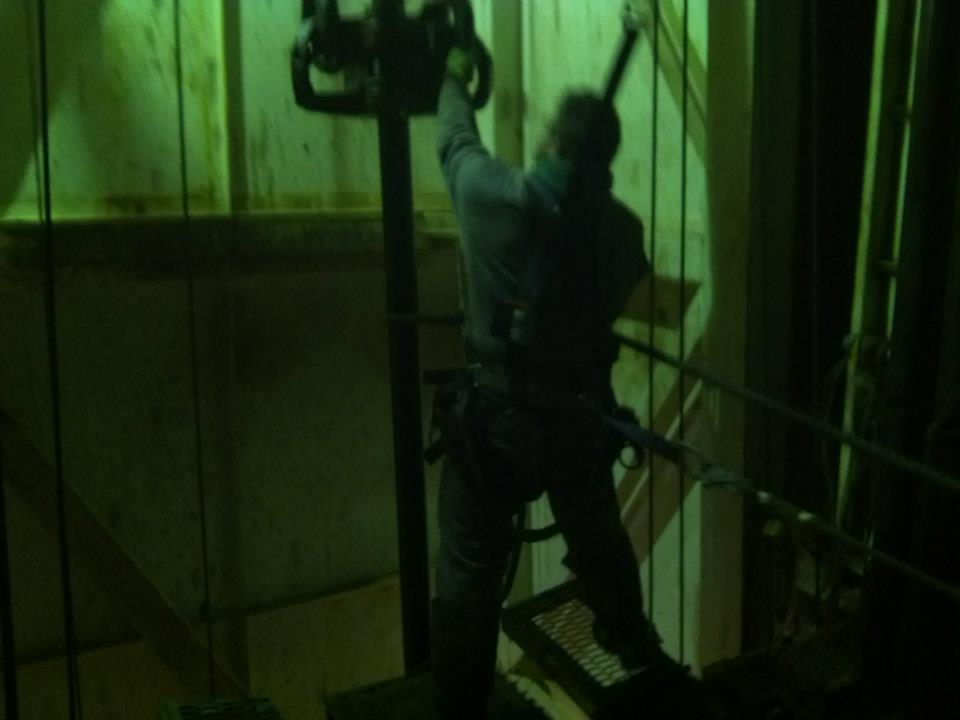
Unlatching pipe

A derrickhand or derrickman is the person who sits atop the derrick on a drilling rig. Though the exact duties vary from rig to rig, they almost always report directly to the driller. Their job is to guide the stands of the drill pipe into the fingers at the top of the derrick. Other duties might include monitoring pH and calcium levels, viscosity and the mud weight (density), adding chemicals and oil based fluids, and being responsible for the shale shakers and mud pump.

== Details ==
The name derrickhand comes from the position they typically occupy, which is at the top of the derrick. From this position they guide the stands of drill pipe, typically 90 feet (27 meters) long, into the fingers at the top of the derrick while tripping (removing the drill string) out of the hole. When tripping into the hole (or "running in") they will pull the pipe out of the fingers and guide it into the elevators suspended from the top drive. Traditionally, the derrickhand also works closely with the mud engineer (see drilling fluid) when not tripping pipe since they are not needed in the derrick. In this capacity it is their responsibility to monitor pH and calcium levels, viscosity and the mud weight (density), adding sacks of chemicals (25-100 lb each) to the mud or oil to maintain the desired properties, and monitor the mud level in the mud pits to aid well control. They are also responsible for the shale shakers and mud pumps (making sure they run well and fixing them as needed). The derrickhand is also responsible for the transfer of additional fluids or chemicals (e.g.: Barite, Bentonite or oil-based fluids) from bulk silos or tanks (tank farm) to the mud system.
