= Restless =

Restless or The Restless may refer to:

== Film and television ==
- Restless (1998 film), a Chinese-American romance film
- Restless (2000 film), a Finnish romantic film
- The Restless (2006 film), a South Korean fantasy film
- Restless (2011 film), an American film directed by Gus Van Sant
- The Restless (2021 film), a drama film directed by Joachim Lafosse
- Restless (2022 film), a French action thriller film
- Restless (2024 film), a UK drama film directed by Jed Hart
- Restless (TV series), a 2012 British adaptation of William Boyd's novel (see below)
- "Restless" (Buffy the Vampire Slayer), a 2000 TV episode

== Music ==
- Restless (band), a British rockabilly band
- Restless Records, an American record label

=== Albums ===
- Restless (Amy Meredith album), 2010
- Restless (The Bellamy Brothers album) or the title song, 1984
- Restless (Faye Wong album) (Fuzao) or the title song, 1996
- Restless (Kasey Lansdale album), 2013
- Restless (Murray Head album), 1984
- Restless (Sara Evans album) or the title song, 2003
- Restless (Shelby Lynne album) or the title song, 1995
- Restless (Skydiggers album) or the title song, 1992
- Restless (Starpoint album) or the title song, 1985
- Restless (Trae album) or the title song, 2006
- Restless (Xzibit album) or the title song, 2000
- Restless: The Best, by Accept, 1982
- Restless, by Bob James, 1994
- Restless, by Elaiza, 2016
- Restless, by Randy California, 1985
- Restless, by Snowy White & the White Flames, 2002
- Restless, by Sylvia Brooks, 2012
- Restless, an EP by Trevor Daniel, 2019

=== Songs ===
- "Restless" (Allday song), featuring the Veronicas, 2019
- "Restless" (Carl Perkins song), 1968
- "Restless" (Elton John song), 1984
- "Restless" (Neja song), 1998
- "Restless" (New Order song), 2015
- "Restless" (Switchfoot song), 2011
- "Restless" (Within Temptation song), 1997
- "Restless", by Alison Krauss from Lonely Runs Both Ways, 2004
- "Restless", by the Damned from Anything, 1986
- "Restless", by Evil Nine from You Can Be Special Too, 2004
- "Restless", by Gordon Lightfoot from Waiting for You, 1993
- "Restless", by JX (Jake Williams), 2004
- "Restless", by Kakkmaddafakka from Hest, 2011
- "Restless", by the Servants' from Disinterest, 1990
- "Restless", by White Dawg, 1999

== Other uses ==
- Restless (novel), a 2006 novel by William Boyd
- Restless Dance Theatre, an Australian dance company

== See also ==
- Psychomotor agitation, restlessness experienced as a result of certain medications or conditions
- Agitation (disambiguation), a synonym for restlessness
