= Brihanmumbai Storm Water Disposal System =

The Brihanmumbai Stormwater Disposal System is a project planned to overhaul Mumbai's water drainage system. The estimated budget for implementing the project is Rs. 12 billion (approx. 300 million US dollars) as of August 2005. Such a high-budget project would require funds from the Central Government. Mumbai has a drainage system, which in many places, are more than 100 years old, consisting of 2,000 km of open drains, 440 km of closed drains, 186 outfalls and more than 30,000 water entrances. The capacity of most of the drains is around 25 mm of rain per hour during low tide, which is exceeded routinely during the monsoon season in Mumbai, which witness more than 1400 mm during June and July. The drain system works with the aid of gravity, with no pumping stations to speed up the drainage. Most of the storm water drains are also choked due to the dumping of garbage by citizens. Portions of Mumbai like Bombay Central and Tardeo remain below sea level. Reclamation of ponds and obstructions in drains due to cables and gas pipe exacerbate the problem.

History of failed drainage system in Mumbai The act of 26 July 2005. The project was conceived after major floods in Mumbai in 1985. Watson Hawksley was appointed as consultants to design the drainage system from Sandhurst Road to Milan subway in 1989. A proposal was submitted in 1993 for a project which involved replacement of drains, setting up of pumping stations at Worli, Haji Ali and Cleaveland Bandar, construction of a five-metre wide road alongside major drains for desilting, removal of obstructions from the drains and rehabilitation of slum-dwellers . The project was not acted upon due to lack of funds till the catastrophic floods in 2005.

The initial estimated cost of the project was around Rs 6 billion. Around Rs 1.43 billion was spent on the project till 1998. By 2005, the project cost had gone up to Rs 12 billion.
