= Christmas with the Dead (short story) =

2010 short story by Joe R. Lansdale

- Artwork by Glen Chadbourne
- Author: Joe R. Lansdale
- Language: English
- Genre: Horror
- Publisher: PS Publishing
- Publication date: 1 December 2010
- Publication place: United Kingdom
- Media type: Print (Chapbook)
- Pages: 25
- ISBN: 978-1-848631-11-3

"Christmas with the Dead" is a short story about a zombie apocalypse by author Joe R. Lansdale. It was published as a chapbook in a limited edition and has been adapted to film.

== Plot summary ==
The story is about a man named Calvin who is determined to celebrate Christmas despite being the only human left in a town inhabited by zombies. Calvin is the lone survivor of a zombie apocalypse in the East Texas town of Mud Creek. He has converted his home into a fortress and is lonely and bored since a freak lightning storm turned his wife and daughter and everyone else in town into zombies some two years ago. So he decides to celebrate Christmas and ventures out to gather decorations.

== Film adaptation ==
The short story was adapted into a film in 2012. It was shot in the East Texas area in the summer of 2011. The film starred Brad Maule, Damian Maffei, and Kasey Lansdale showed on the film festival circuit and at private screenings. It was released on DVD and online.
