= Mud cleaner =

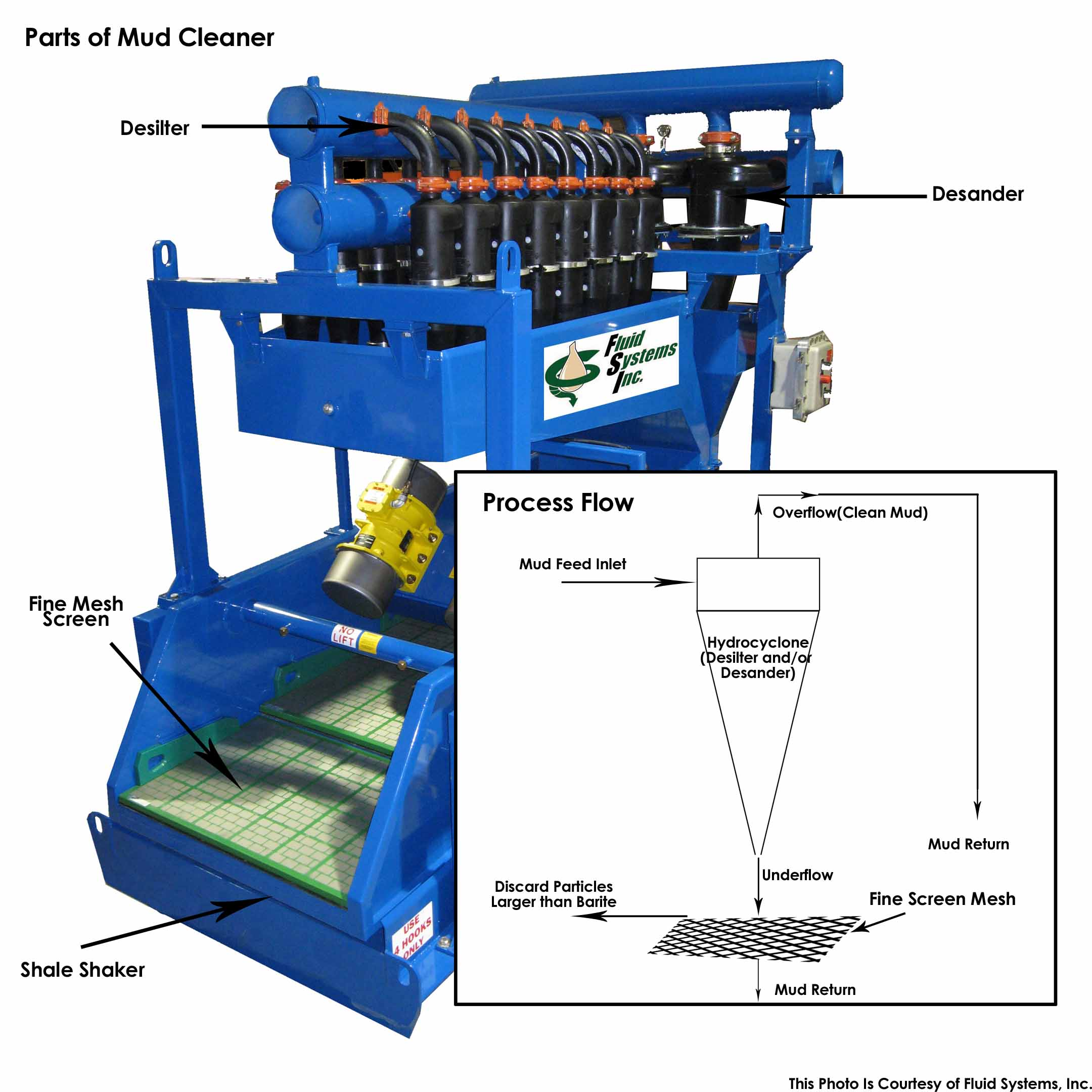
Mud Cleaner

A mud cleaner is a combination of desanders and/or desilters to remove drilled solids from mud.

== History ==
Although US Patent No.3,766,997 covering Mud Cleaner was issued on October 23, 1973 granted to J.K. Heilhecker and L.H. Robinson and assigned to Exxon Production Research Company, it was found invalid and efforts for re-issue was unsuccessful because of the existence of prior art filed at the British Patent Office by a German Inventor in the late 1800s.

Nowadays, mud cleaner used in oilfield means the equipment processing drilling mud. It is combined with desander cone and desilter cone as well as bottom shaker. It is called 2nd and 3rd phase solids control equipment.

== Description ==
A mud cleaner is a combination of desanders and/or desilters mounted over a shaker with a fine mesh screen. A mud is fed to the inlet of the hydrocyclone (desander and/or desilter) to separate particles and the underflow passes to the fine screen mesh where in particles larger than barite are discarded and thrown away. In most drilling operations, a mud cleaner is installed in its mud systems. It is usually located in a mud tank in the same location as with the desilters.

== Process flow ==
The weighted mud flows to the inlet head section of the desander and/or desilter entering the hydrocyclones for separation of particles. Mud leaving the underflow is further screened with fine mesh to separate larger particles allowing only barite size particles to pass through the screen returning and recovering then the clean mud.

== Purpose ==
The purpose of the mud cleaner is to remove drilled solids larger than barite. Solids larger than 74–105 micrometres can be removed by the mud cleaner before the viscosity builds up. Mud cleaner can effectively control weighted drilling fluid solid content. Prevent differential pressure sticking, adhesion stuck drill accident, reduce the drill string and the filter cake thickness on bond issues.
