= Dead on the Bones: Pulp on Fire =

2016 book by Joe R. Lansdale

- Authors: Joe R. Lansdale
- Cover artist: Tim Truman
- Language: English
- Genre: Short story collection
- Publisher: Subterranean Press
- Publication date: 2016
- Publication place: United States
- Media type: Limited edition hardcover, 1500 copies
- Pages: 294
- ISBN: 978-1-59606-747-9
- Preceded by: The Tall Grass and Other Stories
- Followed by: Terror is Our Business: Dana Roberts' Casebook of Horrors(2018)

Dead on the Bones: Pulp on Fire is a collection of novellas and short stories written by American author Joe R. Lansdale. He dedicated this work to his major influences of his youth: Edgar Rice Burroughs and Robert E. Howard. All the stories were written by Lansdale. This book was also dedicated to longtime collaborator artist Timothy Truman and is limited to 1500 copies published by Subterranean Press of Burton, Michigan. It's also available as a Kindle E-Book.

== Table of contents ==
- The Gruesome Affair of the Electric Blue Lightning
- The Redhead Dead
- King of the Cheap Romance
- Naked Angel
- Dead on the Bones
- Tarzan and the Land That Time forgot
- Under the Warrior Star
- The Wizard of the Trees
