= Impossible Monsters =

2013 horror anthology by Kasey Lansdale

- Editor: Kasey Lansdale
- Cover artist: Timothy Truman
- Language: English
- Genre: Horror, short story collection
- Published: July 2013 Subterranean Press
- Publication place: United States
- Media type: Print hardcover, limited edition
- Pages: 205
- ISBN: 978-1-59606-505-5

Impossible Monsters is a horror anthology edited by actress and musician Kasey Lansdale. It was published as both a limited edition and a trade hardcover by Subterranean Press in July 2013. It was Lansdale's first edited anthology.

== Table of contents ==
- "Introduction" by Kasey Lansdale
- "Blue Amber" by David J. Schow
- "Click-Clack the Rattlebag" by Neil Gaiman
- "Cavity Creeps" by Cody Goodfellow
- "The Glitter of the Crowns" by Charlaine Harris
- "Doll's Eyes" by Tim Bryant
- "Bloaters" by Neal Barrett, Jr.
- "Detritus" by Chet Williamson
- "Monster" by Anne Perry
- "Orange Lake" by Al Sarrantonio
- "Nathan" by Selina Rosen
- "Blood Moccasins" by Bradley Denton
- "The Case of the Angry Traveler" (a Dana Roberts novella) by Joe R. Lansdale

== Reception ==
The reviewer at Fearnet called Impossible Monsters "refreshingly lean" and "fun to read". The reviewer at Elitist Book Reviews praised its variety. The Publishers Weekly reviewer wrote that Lansdale had chosen "visceral, creative pieces about ordinary people encountering the extraordinary".
