= Maharashtra floods of 2005 =

2005 natural disaster in the Indian state of Maharashtra

Meteorological history
- Duration: 26–27 July 2005

Overall effects
- Fatalities: 1094
- Areas affected: Maharashtra inclusive of Mumbai

The 2005 Maharashtra floods impacted many parts of the Indian state of Maharashtra, including large areas of the metropolis of Mumbai, a city located on the coast of the Arabian Sea on the western coast of India, in which approximately 1,094 people died. It occurred just one month after the June 2005 Gujarat floods. The term 26 July, is used to refer to the day when the city of Mumbai came to a standstill due to the flooding.

Many people were stranded on the roads and lost their homes, while others had to walk long distances to return home from work that evening. The floods were caused by the eighth heaviest-ever recorded 24-hour rainfall figure of 944 mm (37.17 inches), which lashed the metropolis on "26 July" 2005, and intermittently continued for the next day. A total of 644mm (25.35 inches) was received within the 12-hour period between 8 am and 8 pm. Torrential rainfall continued for the next week. The highest 24-hour period in India was 1,168 mm (46.0 inches) in Aminidivi in the Union Territory of Lakshadweep on 6 May 2004, although some reports suggest that it was a new Indian record. The previous record high rainfall in a 24-hour period for Mumbai was 575 mm (22.6 inches) in 1974.

Other places severely affected were Raigad, Chiplun and Khed, Guhagar.

== Overview ==
=== Timeline ===
On 26 July 2005, around 2:00 pm, the Mumbai Metropolitan Region was struck by a severe storm and subsequent deluge. The Indian Meteorological Department (IMD) station in Santacruz recorded 944 millimetres (37.2 in) 37.2 in. This is the wettest day on record in Mumbai.

Local train movement came to a halt by 2:30 p.m. due to the water-logging on the tracks. This caused traffic on the roads to increase dramatically, with water logging and submerging of certain low-lying pockets of the region, such as Dharavi and Bandra-Kurla Complex.

Thousands of school children were stranded due to the flooding and could not reach home for up to 24 hours. The following two days were declared as school and college holidays by the state government.

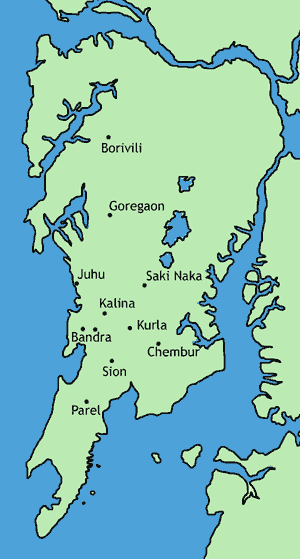
Areas in Mumbai badly affected by the flooding.

=== Threat to public health ===
The rainwater caused the sewage system to overflow and all water lines were contaminated. The Government ordered all housing societies to add chlorine to their water tanks.

== Financial effect ==
The financial cost of the floods was unprecedented and these floods caused a stoppage of the entire commercial, trading, and industrial activity for days. Preliminary indications indicate that the floods caused a direct loss of about ₹5.50 billion (€80 million or US$100 million). The financial impact of the floods was manifested in a variety of ways:

- The banking transactions across the counters were adversely affected and many branches and commercial establishments were unable to function from late evening of 26 July 2005. The state government declared 27 and 28 July as public holidays. ATM networks of several banks, which included the State Bank of India, the nation's largest national bank; ICICI Bank, HDFC Bank, and several foreign banks like Citibank and HSBC, stopped functioning from the afternoon of 26 July 2005 at all the centres of Mumbai. ATM transactions could not be carried out in several parts of India on 26 July or 27 July due to failure of the connectivity with their central systems located in Mumbai.
- The BSE and the NSE, the premier stock exchange, of India could function only partially. In partial trading, the Sensex, India's most tracked equity index, closed at an all-time high of 7605.03 on 27 July 2005. The Exchanges, however, remained closed for the following day.

== Effect on Mumbai's links to the rest of the world ==
- For the first time ever, Mumbai's airports (Chhatrapati Shivaji Maharaj International Airport and Juhu Aerodrome) were shut down for more than 30 hours due to heavy flooding of the runways, submerged Instrument Landing System equipment and extremely poor visibility. Over 700 flights were cancelled or delayed. The airports reopened on the morning of 28 July 2005. Within 24 hours of the airports becoming operational, there were 185 departures and 184 arrivals, including international flights. Again, from the early morning of 31 July, with increase in water logging of the runways and different parts of Mumbai, most of the flights were indefinitely cancelled.
- Two days after reopening the airport, Air India Flight 127 suffered a runway excursion due to hydroplaning after the aircraft skidded on landing on a wet runway. There were no casualties, but the aircraft suffered minor damage, and runway 14/32 was put out of service as the aircraft damaged the runway lights.
- Rail links were disrupted, and reports on the late evening of 30 July indicated cancellation of several long-distance trains till 6 August 2005. Several daily trains between Mumbai CST and Pune, including the Deccan Queen, were cancelled.
- The Mumbai-Pune Expressway, which witnessed a number of landslides, was closed for the first time ever in its history, for 24 hours.
- According to the Hindustan Times, an unprecedented 5 million mobile and 2.3 million MTNL landline users were hit for over four hours.

=== Transport stats ===
- 52 local trains were damaged.
- 37,000 autorickshaws were spoiled
- 4,000 taxis were damaged.
- 900 BEST buses were damaged
- 10,000 trucks and tempos were grounded.

== Factors aggravating the flood of 26th July 2005 in Mumbai ==
=== Antiquated drainage system ===
The present storm-water drainage system in Mumbai was put in place in the early 20th century and is capable of carrying only 25 millimetres of water per hour, which was extremely inadequate on a day when 993 mm of rain fell in the city. The drainage system was also clogged at several places.

Only 3 'outfalls' (ways out to the sea) are equipped with floodgates, whereas the remaining 102 open directly into the sea for more than 24 hours. As a result, there is no way to stop the seawater from rushing into the drainage system during high tide.

In 1990, an ambitious plan was drawn to overhaul the city's storm-water drainage system, which had never been reviewed in over 50 years. A project costing approximately 6 billion rupees was proposed by UK based consultants hired by the Brihanmumbai Municipal Corporation to study the matter. Implementation of the project would have ensured that rainwater did not flood the streets of Mumbai. The project was planned to have completed by 2002 and aimed to enhance the drainage system through larger diameter storm water drains and pipes, using pumps wherever necessary and removing encroachments. The project, if implemented would have doubled the storm water carrying capacity to 50 mm per hour.

The BMC committee had rejected the proposed project on the grounds that it was "too costly". These were a few of the drawbacks due to which the city suffered so gravely.

=== Uncontrolled, unplanned development in Northern Suburbs ===
Development in certain parts of Mumbai is haphazard, and buildings are constructed without proper planning. The drainage plans in the northern suburbs are chalked out as and when required in a particular area and not from an overall point of view.

The Environment Ministry of the Government of India was informed in the early 1990s that sanctioning the Bandra-Kurla Complex, a commercial complex in northern Mumbai, was leading to disaster. No environment clearance is mandatory for large urban construction projects in northern Mumbai. Officials in the environment ministry claimed that it was not practical to impose new guidelines with retrospective effect "as there are millions of buildings".

=== Destruction of mangrove ecosystems ===
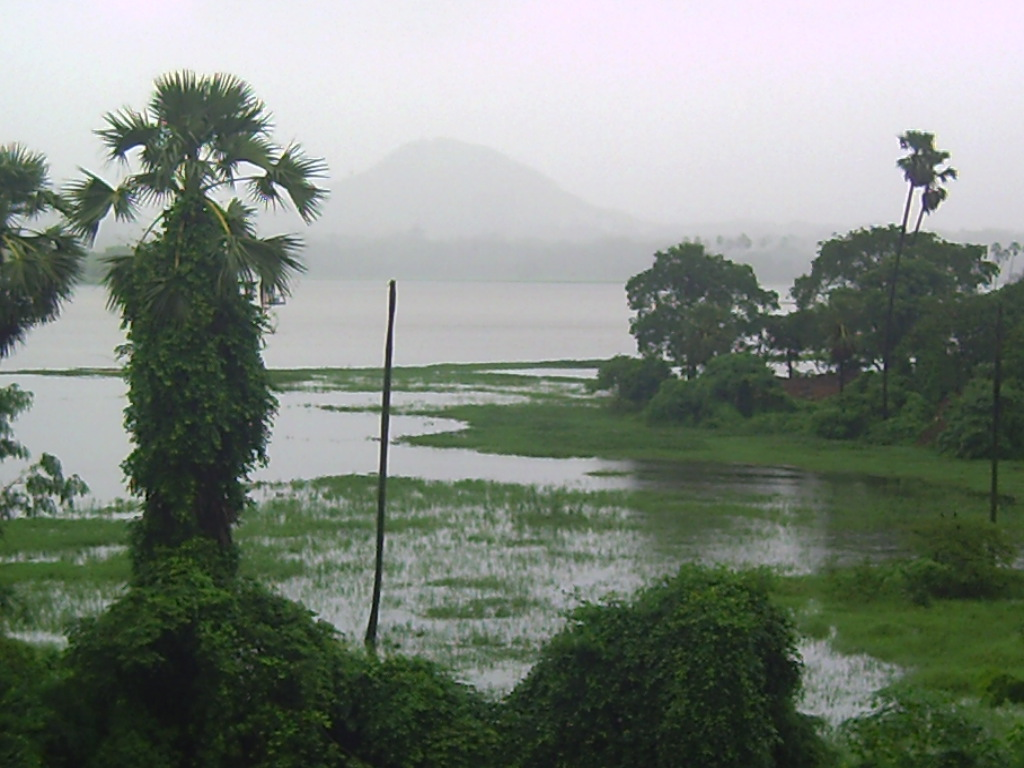
Powai Lake, Mumbai on the verge of overflowing.

Mangrove ecosystems which exist along the Mithi River and Mahim Creek, are being destroyed and replaced with construction. Hundreds of acres of swamps in Mahim Creek have been reclaimed and put to use for construction by builders. These ecosystems serve as a buffer between land and sea. It is estimated that Mumbai has lost about 40% of its mangroves between 1995 and 2005, some to builders and some to encroachment (slums). Sewage and garbage dumps have also destroyed mangroves. The Bandra-Kurla complex in particular was created by replacing such swamps. Mindspace CBD (Inorbit Mall) in Goregaon & Malad has been built by destroying a large patch of mangroves in Maharashtra.

== Academic research ==
The floods have been the subject of research by scientists and social scientists attempting to understand the causes, impacts, and short/long-term consequences. Scholars have studied the floods in Mumbai from the perspectives of climate change, disaster management / mitigation, urban health, vulnerability and adaptation, hydrology, environmental degradation, and encroachment etc. Kapil Gupta (2007) assesses urban flood resilience, while Andharia (2006) contrasts the "widespread acts of generosity and altruism" in Mumbai with the general social disorder that was seen in the aftermath of Hurricane Katrina in New Orleans. Aromar Revi (2005) draws lessons from the floods for prioritising multi-hazard risk mitigation. Parthasarathy (2009) links social and environmental insecurities to show that the most marginalised groups were also the most affected by the floods.

== Role of climate change ==
Climate change has played an important role in causing large-scale floods across central India, especially the Mumbai floods of 2005. During 1901–2015, there has been a three-fold rise in widespread extreme rainfall events, over the entire central belt of India, from Mumbai to Bhubaneshwar, leading to a steady rise in the number of flash floods. The rising number of extreme rain events is attributed to an increase in the fluctuations of the monsoon westerly winds, due to increased warming in the Arabian Sea. This results in occasional surges of moisture transport from the Arabian Sea to the subcontinent, resulting in widespread heavy rains lasting for 2–3 days. The Mumbai 2005 floods also occurred due to moisture surge from the Arabian Sea, and the heavy rains were not confined to Mumbai but spread over a large region across central India.

== In popular culture ==
- The disaster was featured in a National Geographic documentary, titled Mumbai Mega Flood.
- Tum Mile, a 2009 Indian Hindi drama film is set against the backdrop of the disaster.
- Mumbai Diaries, Season 2

== See also ==
- Disaster Management Act, 2005
