= The Tall Grass and Other Stories =

2014 short story collection

- The Tall Grass and Other stories
- Authors: Joe R. Lansdale
- Language: English
- Genre: Short Story Collection
- Publisher: Gere Donovan Press
- Publication date: August 2014
- Publication place: United States
- Media type: Amazon Kindle e-book
- Pages: 140
- Preceded by: A Pair of Aces
- Followed by: Dead on the Bones: Pulp on Fire (2016)

The Tall Grass and other Stories is a short story collection written by American author Joe R. Lansdale. It was published by Gere Donovan Press. This collection is currently only available as an Amazon Kindle e-book. According to the author, it may be available as a printed book at a later date.
