= Agitation =

Agitation may refer to:

== Common use ==
- Agitation (action), putting into motion by shaking or stirring, often to achieve mixing

== Medicine and psychology ==
- Agitation (dementia), a symptom of dementia
- Agitation (medical), a symptom that can result from pain, trauma, drug intoxication, or mental disorders
- Psychomotor agitation, an extreme state of excitement, which can be part of a mental illness or a side effect of anti-psychotic medication

== Music ==
- Agitations (album)
- "Agitation", a Miles Davis song on his album E.S.P.
- "Agitated", a Devo song on their album Total Devo
- "Agitated", a song by the band Muse

== See also ==
- Agitation and Propaganda against the State, a former criminal offence in communist Albania
- Anti-Soviet agitation, a former criminal offence in the Soviet Union
- Agitator (disambiguation)
- Excitation (disambiguation)
- Mix (disambiguation)
- Restless (disambiguation)
