= Degasser =

Device used to remove gases from a liquid

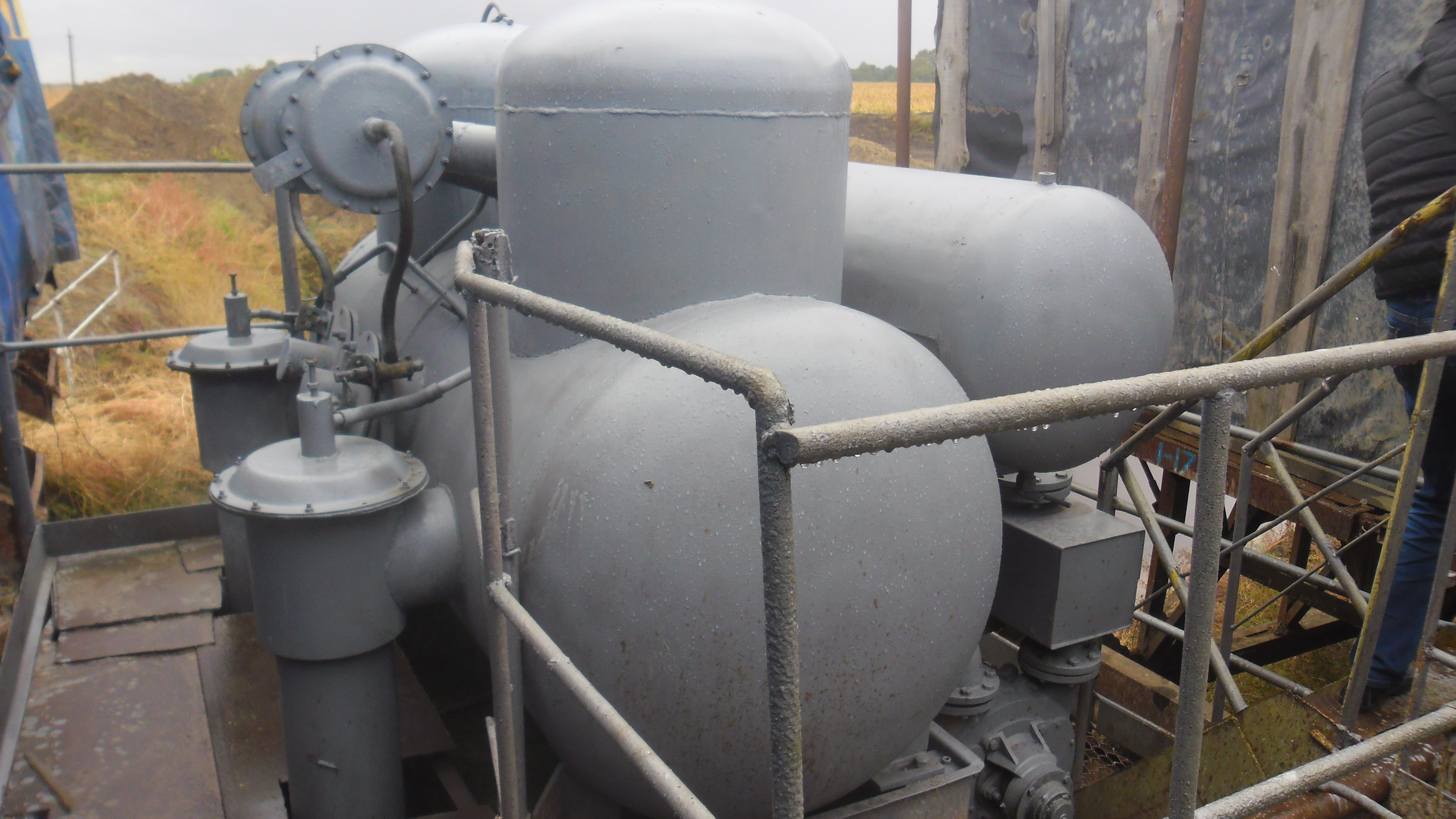
Drilling mud degasser

A degasser is a device used in the upstream oil industry to remove dissolved and entrained gases from a liquid. In drilling it is used to remove gasses from drilling fluid which could otherwise form bubbles. In a produced water treatment plant it is part of the process to clean produced water prior to disposal.

== Degasser ==
For a small amount of entrained gas in a drilling fluid, the degasser can play a major role of removing small bubbles that a liquid film has enveloped and entrapped. In order for it to be released and break out the air and gas such as methane, H_{2}S and CO_{2} from the mud to the surface, the drilling fluid must pass through a degassing technique, and it can be accomplished by the equipment called a degasser, which is also a major part of mud systems.

Another function of a degasser in the oil industry is to remove dissolved gases from a produced water stream as part of the water clean up process prior to its disposal.

== Types of Degasser ==
=== Vacuum Tank Degasser ===
Vacuum Type is the most common form of degasser. It can be horizontal, vertical or round vessel. A vacuum action is created to pull in the gas cut mud. When the liquid enters the tank it will flow and be distributed to a layer of internal baffle plates designed for the mud to flow in thin laminar film and is exposed to a vacuum that forces the gas to escape and break out of the mud. The vacuum pump moves the escaping gas from the vessel discharging it to the rig's flare or environmental control system.

=== Atmospheric Degasser ===
This type of degasser processes mud by accelerating fluid through a submerged pump impeller and impinging the fluid on a stationary baffles to maximize surface and thus enable escaping gas vent to atmosphere.

=== Produced water Degasser ===
A produced water degasser can be either a horizontal or vertical vessel. It operates at a low pressure to maximise the amount of gas (eg methane, carbon dioxide) that is removed from the water stream. It can be located immediately downstream of the production separators prior to low pressure water treatment system such as dissolved gas flotation. In this case the degasser may also act as a surge drum to ensure a steady flow of water to the treatment plant. Alternatively, it can be located downstream of produced water hydrocyclones. In either case the degasser provides sufficient residence time to allow dissolved or entrained gases to be released from the produced water stream. From the degasser water is disposed of via a caisson into the sea, or for disposal elsewhere. The separated gas is routed from the degasser to a flare or vent system for safe disposal. The degasser can be provided with an oil collection device to remove accumulated oil from the surface of the produced water inside the degasser. A degasser may accumulate solids (sand) in its base, facilities to remove solids may be installed.

== See also ==
Mud Gas Separator

Degassing
