= Terror Is Our Business =

Terror Is Our Business: Dana Roberts' Casebook of Horrors
- Cover art by Luke Spooner
- Authors: Joe R. Lansdale and Kasey Lansdale
- Cover artist: Luke Spooner
- Genre: Horror Fiction
- Publisher: Cutting Block Books
- Publication date: May 28, 2018
- Media type: Trade Paperback
- Pages: 230
- ISBN: 978-1-7320090-0-4
- Preceded by: Dead on The Bones: Pulp on Fire (2016)
- Followed by: Driving to Geronimo's Grave and Other Stories (2018)

Terror Is Our Business: Dana Roberts' Casebook of Horrors is a collection of short stories written by American authors Joe R. Lansdale and Kasey Lansdale. It chronicles the stories of Dana Roberts, an investigator of paranormal activities. This is one of several times Joe and daughter Kasey have written about their heroine. This collection was published by Cutting Block Books as a trade paperback.

== Table of contents ==
- Introduction: Dana Roberts, Her Kith and Kin
- The Case of the Lighthouse Shambler
- The Case of the Stalking Shadow
- The Case of the Four Acre Haunt
- The Case of the Angry Traveler
- Introduction: Jana and Dana
- Blind Love
- The Case of the Bleeding Wall
- The Case of the Ragman's Anguish
