= Christmas with the Dead (film) =

- Theatrical and DVD poster
- Directed by: Terrill Lee Lankford
- Written by: Keith Lansdale
- Based on: "Christmas with the Dead" by Joe R. Lansdale
- Produced by: William Arscott; Brad Maule; Marion Arscott
- Starring: Damian Maffei; Brad Maule; Kasey Lansdale; Chet Williamson
- Cinematography: Bil Arscott
- Edited by: Dan Golden
- Music by: Kasey Lansdale; Judith Pancoast; Tasmanian Orchestra
- Distributed by: Drive-in Movies
- Release date: November 25, 2012
- Running time: 88 minutes
- Country: United States
- Language: English

Christmas with the Dead is a 2012 American zombie apocalypse film directed by Terrill Lee Lankford, based on the 2010 short story by Joe R. Lansdale.

== Plot ==
Strange electrical currents hurtle towards Earth from outer space. Calvin lives a typical life with his wife Ella and daughter Tina in the fictional East Texas town of Mud Creek It's during the holidays and one night Ella harasses him to put up Christmas decorations on their home. Instead Calvin naps on the couch and then a freak lightning storm from the strange electrical currents causes everyone who sees it to drop dead. When Calvin awakes he finds his wife and daughter seemingly dead. Awash with grief, he lays the two out on their bed. As soon as Calvin turns his back, his daughter rises from the dead and crawls out an open window. Then Ella rises as a zombie and attacks him. After he subdues her, his neighbor Ray shows up and tells Calvin Tina has bitten him and he had no choice but to kill her by striking her with a hammer. Soon Calvin realizes most of the inhabitants of Mud Creek are now zombies.

Flash forward two years and Calvin has adapted to his lifestyle of living in a world full of the un-dead. He keeps his wife Ella chained up on the back porch of his house which is now a small fortress to keep the zombies at bay. He feeds Ella dog food in a dog bowl as he just can't bring himself to kill her for good. He transmits from the local radio station hoping someone will hear him, but it's to no avail. He even greets his former friend Ray, now a zombie after being bitten by Calvin's young daughter, as he drives away to run errands. He then runs into a man shooting zombies and dragging them to his pickup. The man at first thinks Calvin is a zombie and tries to shoot him. When Calvin asks the man what's he doing, he replies "Shooting the shit out of zombies". This is the first living human Calvin has seen in years. G.M. states his 3D glasses he always wears saved him from the effects of the storm. Calvin objects to G.M. shooting the zombies saying they are sick people. "These are my neighbors!" he replies. That night on G.M.'s roof, the two play loud music with a heavy beat and the zombies come pouring out of the woods and "dance" to the beat of the music.

One day some former inmates from a state mental hospital hear Calvin's broadcast on their car radio. The inmates armed with handguns take Calvin and G.M. hostage and then to meet Reverend Mac who rules over the former inmates of the hospital, some of whom are clearly mentally ill, with the cult-like zeal of a Jim Jones. Now it's up to Calvin and G.M. to escape from both the Reverend and his flock of mentally deranged patients and the zombies as well.

== Cast ==
- Calvin - Damian Maffei
- G.M. - Brad Maule
- Ella - Kasey Lansdale
- Reverend Mac - Chet Williamson
- Andy - Kurt Stringer
- Driver - Clyde Allen Williams Jr.
- Ray - Adam Coats
- Tina - Madeline Brassell

== Production ==
Much of this film was shot in the Nacogdoches, Texas area in the summer of 2011. It was directed by author and director Terrill Lee Lankford. Producers include William Arscott and Brad Maule. Much of the soundtrack was performed by co-star Kasey Lansdale who is also a successful musician and the daughter of author Joe R. Lansdale whose short story the film was based on. William Arscott, Joe Lansdale, and his wife Karen also served as executive producers. Joe's son Keith wrote the screenplay. Many locals from the Nacogdoches area performed as extras despite the East Texas heat and heavy layers of makeup. The DVD was released on The Drive-in Movies label.
