= Kasey Lansdale =

American singer-songwriter

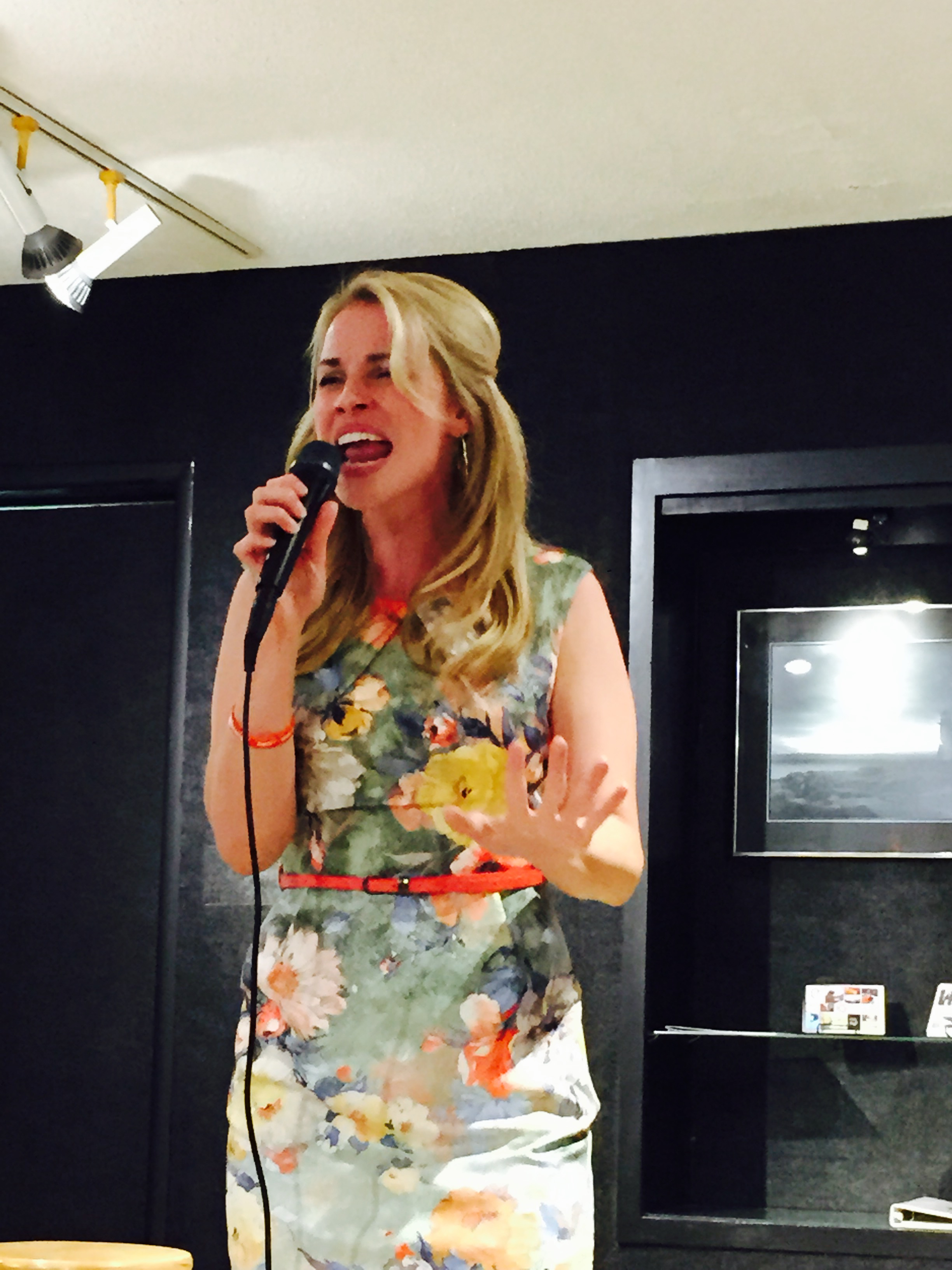
- Kasey Lansdale in 2015

Background information
- Born: Kasey Jo Lansdale; June 24, 1988 (age 38); Nacogdoches, Texas, U.S
- Genres: Country, folk
- Occupations: Musician, writer, actress, producer
- Instrument: Vocals
- Years active: 2005–current
- Label: Blue Siren Records
- Website: kaseylansdale.com

Kasey Lansdale (born June 24, 1988) is an American country music singer-songwriter from Nacogdoches, Texas. Lansdale is also known for her work as an author, editor, actress, and producer, as well as host and founder of the East Texas Songwriter's Workshop. Her full-length debut album Restless was released on August 20, 2013, on Blue Siren Records; it was co-produced by Mike Clute and Kasey Lansdale. The Executive Producer is John Carter Cash.

== Early life ==
Kasey Lansdale is a graduate of Nacogdoches High School. She attended Stephen F. Austin State University as a social work major, but did not complete her studies, dropping out to pursue her musical and acting career.

== Music career ==
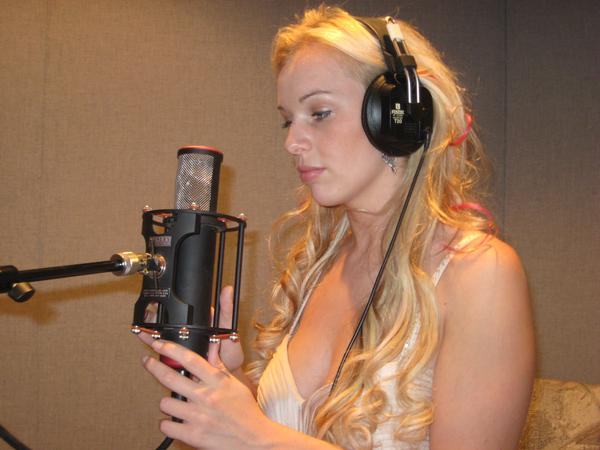
Kasey Lansdale in the recording studio, 2010

In 2007, Lansdale debuted a three-track EP with Texas Swing Song, Back of My Smile, penned by Lansdale, catching the attention of venues throughout Texas. This led her to tour as an opening act with her first band, "Kasey Lansdale & The Daletones," for country music legend Ray Price at several of his concerts throughout Texas.

She co-wrote two songs set to appear on the soundtrack of the horror film Christmas with the Dead.

Lansdale created and hosted "The East Texas Songwriter's Workshop," where Grammy Award winning artist Linda Davis, Grammy Nominee Songwriter Bonnie Baker, and Grammy Award-winning producer John Carter Cash appeared as guests.

Kasey Lansdale penned the song Edge of Dark Water, which was released as a digital download for British and American editions of the novel of the same name by her father Joe R. Lansdale.

Lansdale performed as a headliner at the Piacenza Blues Festival, as well as other events and festivals across Europe. She recorded briefly with Davide Di Leo, or "Boosta," of the Premio Italiano della Musica award-winning group Subsonica. Her 2010 album Never Say Never was recorded at Warner Nashville Studios.

In 29014, Lansdale got the Country Music Association's "debut spotlight" for April and toured with her producer John Carter Cash.

Lansdale's single "Sorry Ain't Enough" debuted at #4 on the National MPE Downloads Chart. Her songs Back of My Smile and Foolin' Around were on the soundtrack for the film Cold in July.

In 2015 she was nominated for Best New Female Artist of the Year at the 2015 Texas Regional Radio Music Awards. An EP titled Leave Her Wild was released 08/01/16 on Blue Siren Records, produced by John Carter Cash and recorded at the Cash Cabin Studio.

Lansdale's EP Leave Her Wild has been featured on Sundance Channel's Hap and Leonard, a series based on her father's novels, as well as on The Animal Planet show Finding Bigfoot, where she performed her single Living in the Moment.

She opened for Wynonna Judd in 2016.

== Writing career ==
Kasey Lansdale's short story "The Companion," on which she collaborated with her brother Keith and father Joe Lansdale, appeared in the Random House collection Great Writers and Kids Write Spooky Stories (Great Writers & Kids Anthologies, hardcover, ed. Greenberg, Morgan & Weinberg). This story later reappeared in A Fistfull of Stories, from Joe R. Lansdale, as well as the collection Bumper Crop.

Her non-fiction article "Growing up Lansdale style" was published in 2012 by online magazine The Horror Zine, and later published in The Horror Zine print anthology, "A Feast of Frights". She is also the editor of the horror anthology Impossible Monsters published by Subterranean Press and featuring stories from Neil Gaiman, Charlaine Harris, Anne Perry, Joe R. Lansdale, & David Schow among others.

Lansdale edited an all e-book horror fiction anthology for Biting Dog Press titled Fresh Blood & Old Bones, showcasing new authors, which was published in September 2012.

With her father she wrote the short story Blind Love, which is included in the HarperCollins anthology Dark Duets.

Her short story The Flame was published by SST publications in 2014.

In 2016, Subterranean Press published The Case of the Bleeding Wall: A Dana Roberts novella co-written with her father, Joe R. Lansdale. In May 2018 Terror is Our Business: Dana Roberts' Casebook of Horrors, also co-written with her father, was published by Cutting Block Books. A “Creepshow” episode based on the short story "The Companion" by Joe R. Lansdale, Kasey Lansdale, and Keith Lansdale aired in 2019.

== Pandi Press ==
Pandi Press is a publishing company formed by Kasey Lansdale and her father to publish and re-issue Joe R. Lansdale's older works.

== Film & theater career ==
Lansdale's first feature film role was Ella in the horror film, Christmas with the Dead.

Lansdale in 2018

In 2011, she produced a stage reading of "Suckerfish", written by W.T. Underwood and directed by Thomas Jane, alongside the one-act play By Bizarre Hands by Joe R. Lansdale, directed by Terrill Lee Lankford at the Steve Allen Theater in Los Angeles. She also appeared in Grammy award-winning artist Jim Lauderdale's music video "Ever Gonna Hurt" as the love interest. In 2015 Lansdale was featured in a short film by director Izzy Lee titled Postpartum.

Kasey Lansdale was a featured performer on the Sundance Channel TV show Hap and Leonard where she performed her original song Back Of My Smile (Season 2, ep 5).

Lansdale narrated Stan Lee's The Reflection voicing characters Margaret Fisher and Nina Fisher. She is also a voice actor in George RR Martin's Wild Cards.

== Personal life ==
Lansdale supports the non-profit organization Protect: The National Association to Protect Children, as well as animal rights advocacy groups. Lansdale has stated that Reba McEntire is her most important early musical influence. Her father is award-winning author Joe R. Lansdale.

== Discography ==
- No More Rain −2006 Blue Siren Records
- Back of My Smile −2006 Blue Siren Records
- Know Me −2007 Blue Siren Records
- Never Say Never −2010 Blue Siren Records
- Restless −2013 Blue Siren Records
- MADD Texas Artists: Clouded Mind featured
- Leave Her Wild EP. Single is Living in the Moment. Blue Siren Records, TBR 08/01/16.

== Bibliography ==
- Fresh Blood & Old Bones (2013) (Biting Dog Publications e-book, editor)
- Impossible Monsters (2013) (Subterranean Press, editor)
- Terror is Our Business (2018) (Cutting Block Books, co-author with Joe Lansdale)
