= Solids control =

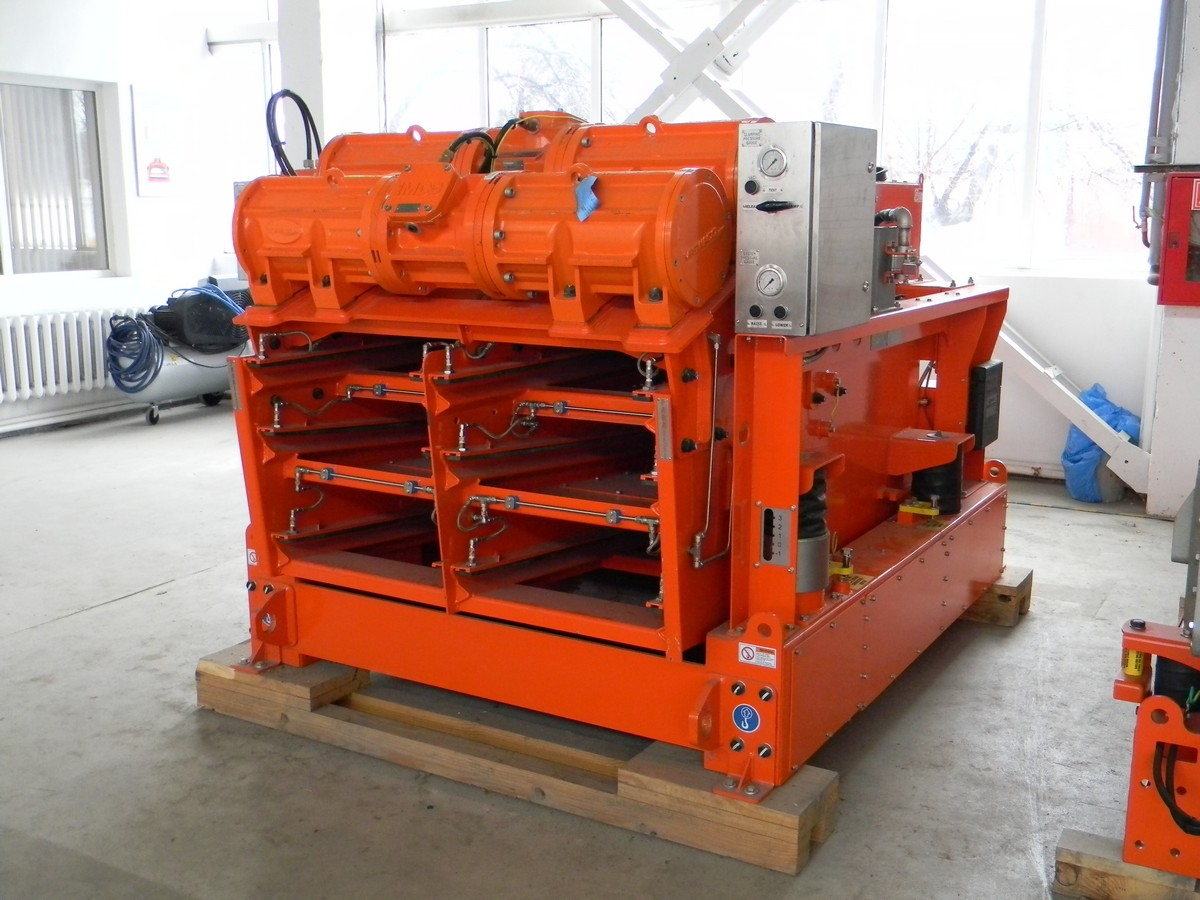
Three deck shale shaker, part of a solids control system

Solids control is a process used in drilling rigs which use drilling fluid. It involves separating the "cuttings" (drilled material) from the fluid, allowing it to be recirculated or discharged to the environment.

== Background ==
Drilling rigs are drilling systems for creating boreholes in the ground. They use drilling fluid (also known as drilling mud) as lubricant and coolant for the drill bit and to clear the cuttings out of the hole. The drilling fluid needs to have the cuttings removed before being recirculated or discharged, which is achieved by the solids control system attached to the rig.

== Operation ==
Solids control systems consist of several stages of treatment, removing progressively finer particles from the drilling fluid.

=== Screen separation ===
The principle of screen separation is to pass the drilling fluid over the screens with different size holes, allowing fluid and small particles to pass through while separating larger particles. It is used to filter large solids out of the drilling mud, typically with particle sizes above 75μm. The machines that use this principle are called shale shakers, and consist of a series of vibrating screens that the mud passes over. When working effectively these machines can remove up to 80% of the cuttings from the drilling fluid.

=== Settling separation ===
Settling separation relies on gravity to draw solid particles down through the fluid in vessels called mud pits or silt pits. The fluid flow rate is reduced, allowing the particles to drift down while the clean fluid is drawn off. This stage of separation deals with particle sizes between 15μm and 74μm.

=== Forced separation ===
Forced separation relies on perceived centrifugal force pushing solid particles to the outside of a rotating body of fluid. Machines that use this principle include centrifuges and hydrocyclones. The drilling fluid is injected into a cone-shaped vessel at high pressure, allowing the clean fluid to be drawn off from the top of the chamber. An alternate design relies on a rapidly rotating drum, which flings the solids in the drilling fluid to the outside of the cylinder to be drawn off as a thick sludge.

=== Gas separation ===
Sometimes gas can get into the drilling fluid from the rock that the borehole passes through. This can reduce the density of the fluid, causing structural issues in the well. A vacuum is applied to remove the gas from the fluid, then vented or flared off.
