= The Agitators: The Story of Susan B. Anthony and Frederick Douglass =

Theatre play about American abolitionists

The Agitators: The Story of Susan B. Anthony and Frederick Douglass is a play which was later adapted into a podcast.

== Background ==
The play was created in 2017 by Mat Smart and directed by Valeria Curtis-Newton. The work was commissioned by the New York State Council on the Arts. The play begins with Frederick Douglass playing the violin and Susan B. Anthony at a picnic. The play stars Curtis M. Jackson as Frederick Douglass and Jessica Link as Susan B. Anthony. The play was produced by the Alabama Shakespeare Festival. The play follows the friendship between Frederick Douglass and Susan B. Anthony over the course of a 45 year period. The play was performed soon after restrictions had been lifted during the COVID-19 pandemic. In 2020, the play was directed by Signe Harriday. The play won a 2017 Edgerton Foundation New Play Award.

== Adaptation ==
The show was later adapted into a podcast hosted by Ashley C. Ford. The podcast was produced by the National Park Service, Public Radio Exchange, and the Women's Suffrage Centennial Commission. The podcast debuted on November 18, 2020 and starred Cedric Mays as Frederick Douglass and Madeleine Lambert as Susan B. Anthony.
