= Restless (Kasey Lansdale album) =

Studio album by Kasey Lansdale
- Released: August 2013
- Studio: Cash Cabin Studio (Hendersonville, Tennessee)
- Genre: country, country rock
- Length: 34:43
- Label: Blue Siren Records
- Producer: John Carter Cash (executive), Michael D. Clute, Kasey Lansdale

Kasey Lansdale chronology
Never Say Never (2010)	Restless (2013)

Restless is the first full-length album by American actor and musician Kasey Lansdale. It was recorded in 2013 and the executive producer is John Carter Cash. It was released on the indie label Blue Siren Records and was recorded at the Cash Cabin Studio near Nashville, Tennessee. To support the record, she has been touring both in the U.S. and Europe.

== Track listing ==
1. Sorry Ain't Enough
2. Foolin' Around
3. Better Now
4. Blame You for Trying
5. Why Can't I
6. Never Say Never
7. Don't Let That Stop You
8. Hard to be a Lady
9. Just Another Guy
10. Somewhere Else
11. Half as Much
