= Damian Maffei =

American actor (born 1977)

- Born: Damian Paul Maffei; June 27, 1977 (age 48); Maspeth, Queens, United States
- Occupation: Actor

Damian Paul Maffei (born June 27, 1977) is an American actor. He appeared in the thriller film Closed for the Season (2010) and played an antagonist in the slasher films The Strangers: Prey at Night (2018) and Haunt (2019).

== Film ==
Year	Film	Role	Note
1996	The Offering	Drug Park Kid #11	
2003	Nikos	Brunette Cop	
2004	Ghost Lake	Young Fisherman	
2008	LiveMansion: The Movie	Jack	
2009	7 Couches	Michael	
2010	Closed for the Season	James	
2010	Ext. Life	Dave	
2011	Mister Weed-Eater	Harold	
2012	Christmas with the Dead	Calvin	
2018	The Strangers: Prey at Night	Man in the Mask	
2019	Haunt	Devil	
2021	Wrong Turn	Morgan / Deer Skull	
2022	A Wonderful Time of the Year	Funcle Pat	
2023	The Texas Chain Saw Massacre	Johnny (voice)	Video game
2024	Stream	Fred Flemmich	

== Theatre ==
Play	Role	Production company
Suckerfish	Hank	Thomas Jane
Miracle Day	Ted	The Modern Stage
A Night of Joe R. Lansdale	The Narrator	Bellmojo Productions
The Music Man	Harold Hill	Cultural Arts Playhouse
Cabaret	Ernst	Rockville Centre Guild for the Arts
