= Industrial agitator =

Machines used for industrial-scale mixing of fluids

Industrial agitators are machines used to stir or mix fluids in industries that process products in the chemical, food, pharmaceutical and cosmetic industries. Their uses include:

- mixing liquids together
- promote the reactions of chemical substances
- keeping homogeneous liquid bulk during storage
- increase heat transfer (heating or cooling)

== Types ==
Several different kind of industrial agitators exist:

- mechanical agitators (rotating)
- static agitators (pipe fitted with baffles)
- rotating tank agitators (e.g., a concrete mixer)
- paddle type mixers
- agitators working with a pump blasting liquid
- agitator turning tanks to gas

The choice of the agitator depends on the phase that needs to be mixed (one or several phases): liquids only, liquid and solid, liquid and gas or liquid with solids and gas. Depending on the type of phase and the viscosity of the bulk, the agitator may be called a mixer, kneader, dough mixer, amongst others. Agitators used in liquids can be placed on the top of the tank in a vertical position, horizontally on the side of the tank, or less commonly, on the bottom of the tank.

== Principle of agitation ==
The agitation is achieved by movement of the heterogeneous mass (liquid-solid phase). In mechanical agitators, this the result of the rotation of an impeller. The bulk can be composed of different substances and the aim of the operation is to blend it or to improve the efficiency of a reaction by a better contact between reactive product. Agitation may also be used to increase heat transfer or to maintain particles in suspension.

== Data of an agitator ==
The agitation of liquid is made by one or several agitation impellers. Depending on its shape, the impeller can generate:

- the moving of the liquid which is characterized by its velocity and direction.
- Turbulence which is an erratic variation in space and time of local fluid velocity.
- Shearing given by a velocity gradient between two filets of fluids.

These two phenomena provide energy consumption.

== Impellers ==
Propellers (marine or hydrofoil) give an inlet and outlet which are on axial direction, preferably downward, they are characterized by a nice pumping flow, low energy consumption and low shear magnitude as well as low turbulence. An impeller is a rotor that produces a sucking force, and is part of a pump.

Turbines (flat blades or pitched blades) which inlet flow is axial and outlet flow is radial will provide shearing, turbulence and need approximately 20 time more energy than propellers, for the same diameter and same rotation speed.

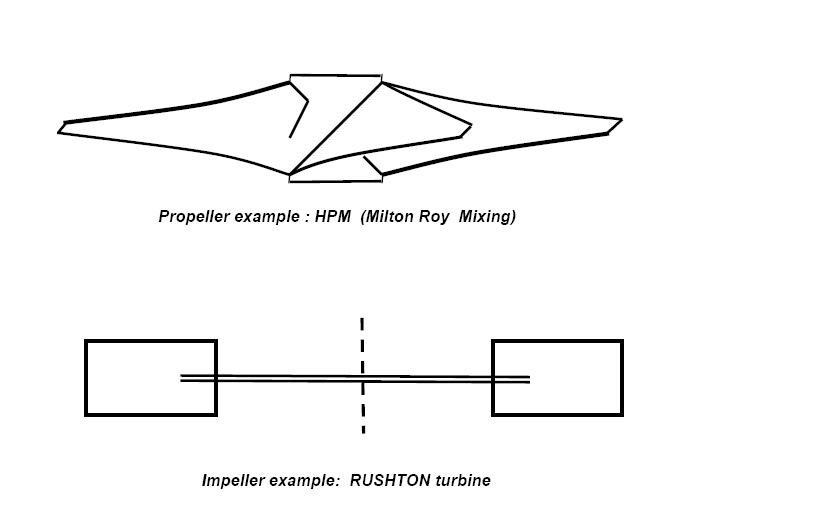

== Mechanical features ==
An agitator is composed of a drive device ( motor, gear reducer, belts…), a guiding system of the shaft (lantern fitted with bearings), a shaft and impellers .

If the operating conditions are under high pressure or high temperature, the agitator must be equipped with a sealing system to keep tightened the inside of the tank when the shaft is crossing it.

If the shaft is long (> 10m), it can be guided by a bearing located in the bottom of the tank (bottom bearing).

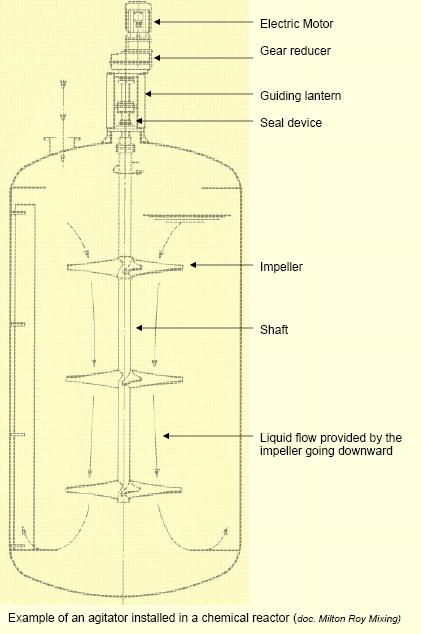
