= Mud agitator =

A mud agitator is used in surface mud systems to suspend solids and maintain homogeneous mixture throughout the system. A mechanical agitator is driven by an explosion-proof motor, coupled to a gear box that drives the impeller shaft. The impellers (turbines) transform mechanical power into fluid circulation or agitation. The objective is to obtain a uniform suspension of all solids.

== Types of agitator mounting ==
- Horizontally mounted agitator
- Vertically mounted agitator

== Types of agitating shaft seal ==
- Mechanical seal
- Packing seal

== Types of agitator impellers ==
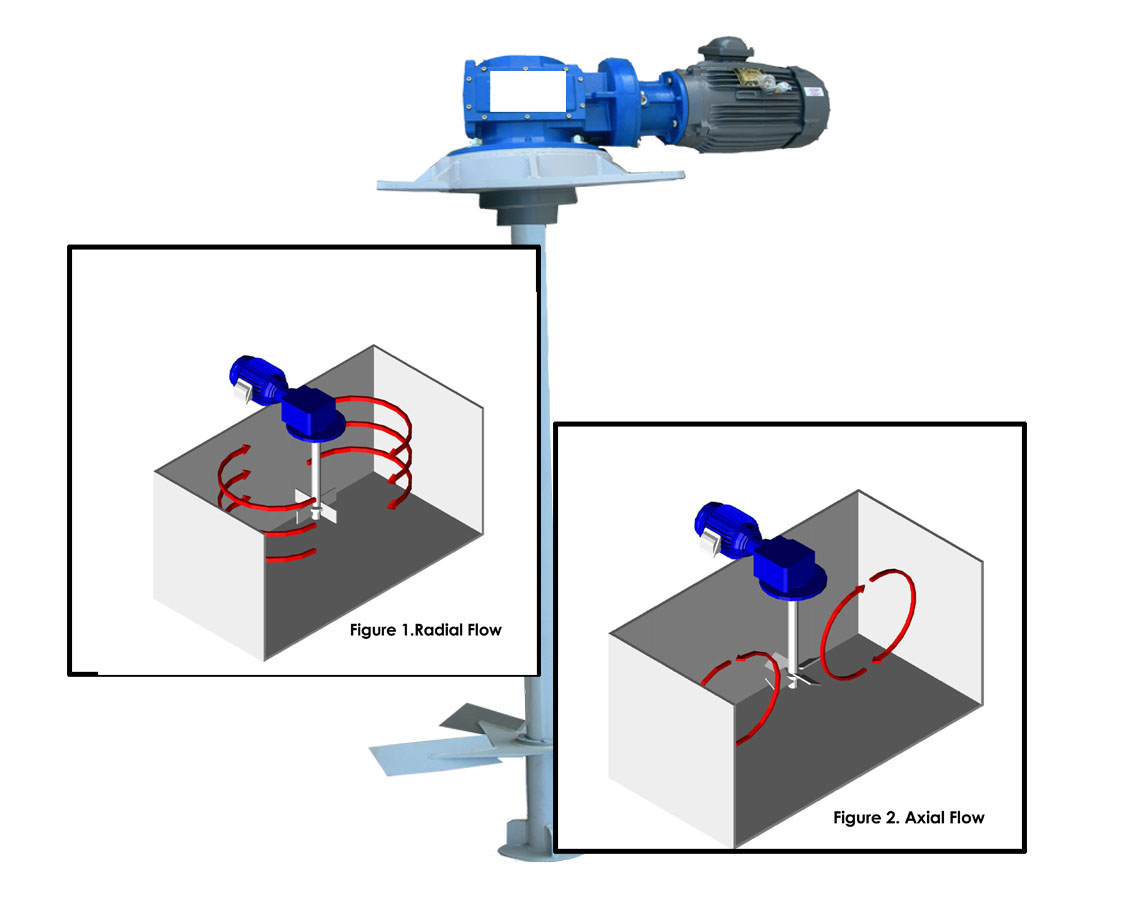
Types of Agitator Impellers

- Radial Flow Impeller. Figure 1 shows a radial flow created by the impellers wherein the circulation is predominantly horizontal.
- Axial Flow Impellers. Figure 2 shows an axial flow created by the impellers wherein the circulation is predominantly axial fluid movement.

== Types of impeller blades ==
- Flat blade impeller
- Canted blade impeller
- Contour blade impeller
