= Hydrocyclone =

Cyclonic separators making use of gravity

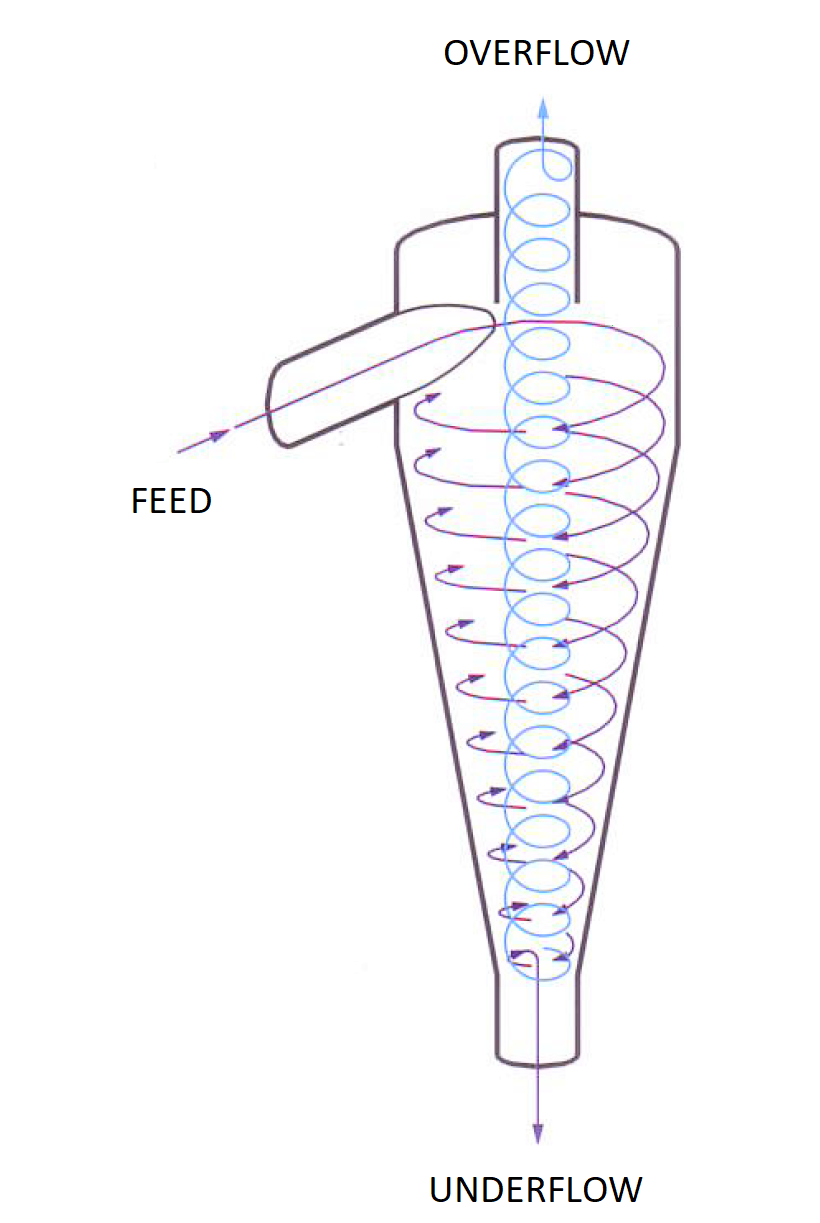
A hydrocyclone showing the paths of fluid flow.

Hydrocyclones are a type of cyclonic separators that separate product phases mainly on basis of differences in gravity with aqueous solutions as the primary feed fluid.

As opposed to dry or dust cyclones, which separate solids from gasses, hydrocyclones separate solids or different phase fluids from the bulk fluid. A hydrocyclone comprises a cylindrical shaped feed part with tangential feed; an overflow part with vortex finder; a conical part with an apex. A cyclone has no moving parts.

== Working principle ==
Product is fed into the hydrocyclone tangentially under a certain pressure. This creates a centrifugal movement, pushing the heavier phase outward and downward alongside the wall of the conical part. The decreasing diameter in the conical part increases the speed and so enhances the separation. Finally, the concentrated solids are discharged through the apex. The vortex finder in the overflow part creates a fast rotating upward spiral movement of the fluid in the centre of the conically shaped housing. The fluid is discharged through the overflow outlet.

== Cyclone parameters ==
The following parameters are decisive for good cyclone operation:

- the design
- the specific weight difference between the two product phases
- the shape of the solids
- the speed of the feed
- the density of the medium
- the counter pressure at the overflow and apex

== Areas of application ==
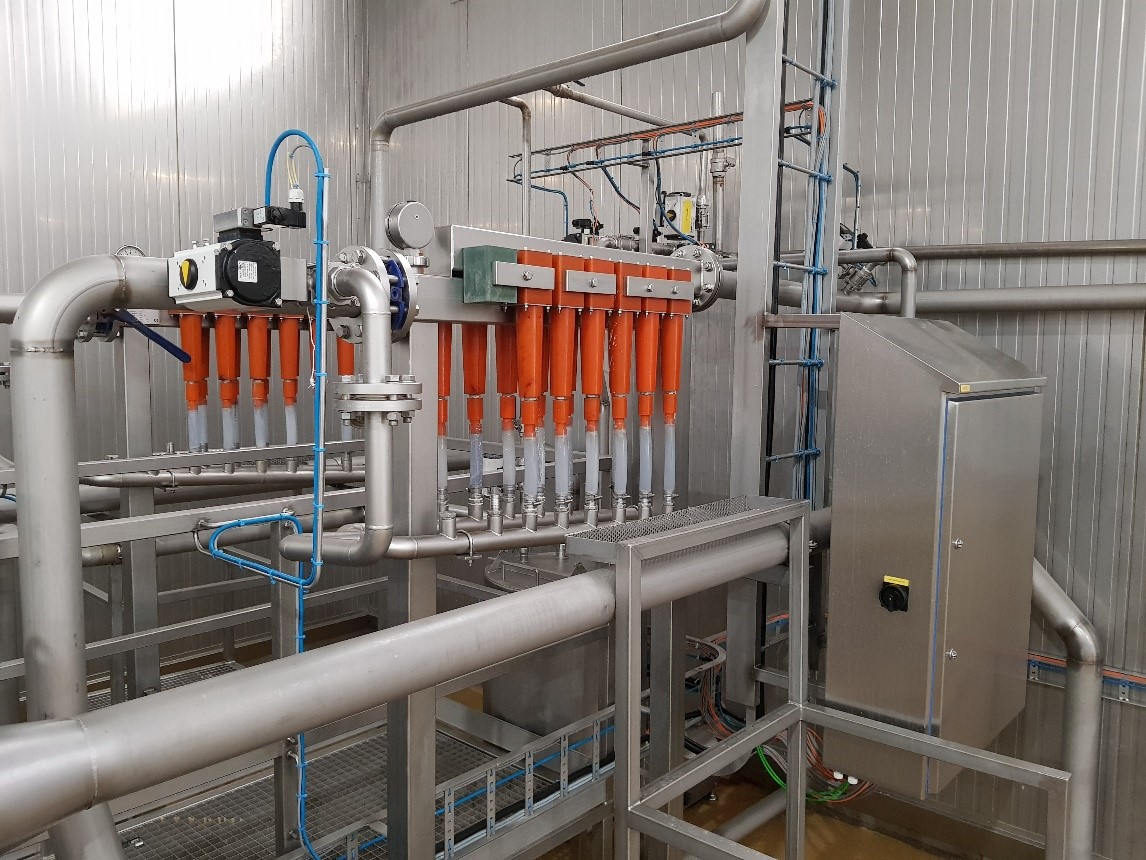
A series of hydrocylones used for recovering starches in potato cutting food processing facilities.

The main areas of application for hydrocyclones are:

- Mineral processing industry Hydrocyclones are frequently utilized in the metallurgical and mineral processing industry for the classification of fine particles and dewatering of slurries.
- In coal washery units : When magnetite and water are used as media in a cyclone then it is called a Dense Media Cyclone (DMC). DMCs are frequently used for washing coal.
- Starch industry Hydrocyclones are commonplace in the potato starch, cassava starch (tapioca), wheat starch and corn starch industry for the concentration and refining of starch slurries.
- The potato processing industry Hydrocyclones are used for the separation of starch from cutting water in the French fries and potato crisp and potato flakes industry.
- Sand separation and classification Hydrocyclones used for sand separation and classification and as a separator of sand from water or sludge
- Oil-water separation: Separation of oil and water in, among other things, the offshore industry
- Dewatering: Concentration of slurry and dewater sludge for disposal
- Microplastic separation: Removal of microplastics from wastewater

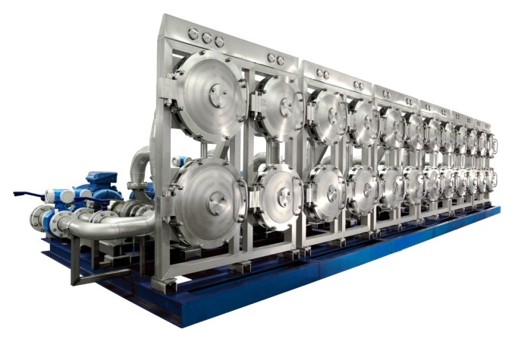
SiccaDania starch refining unit
