= Shale shakers =

Drilling equipment components

Typical shale shakers on a drilling rig

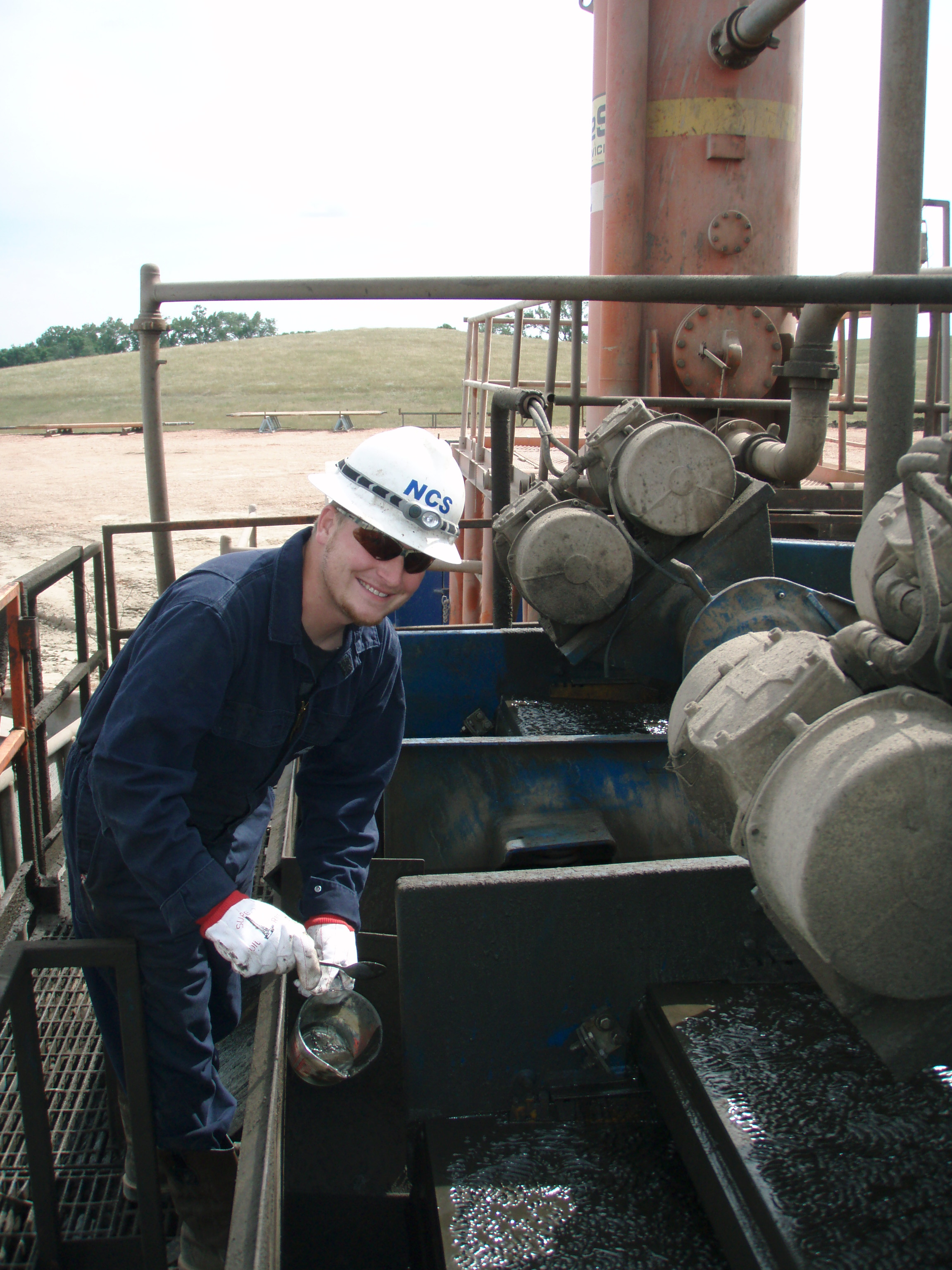
Mudloggers collecting samples out of the shakers

Shale shakers are components of drilling equipment used in many industries, such as coal cleaning, mining, oil and gas drilling.They are the first phase of a solids control system on a drilling rig, and are used to remove large solids (cuttings) from the drilling fluid ("mud").

Drilling fluids are integral to the drilling process and, among other functions, serve to lubricate and cool the drill bit, as well as convey the drilled cuttings away from the bore hole. These fluids are a mixture of various chemicals in a water- or oil-based solution and can be very expensive to make. For both environmental reasons and to reduce the cost of drilling operations, drilling fluid losses are minimized by stripping them away from the drilled cuttings before the cuttings are disposed of: this is done using a multitude of specialized machines and tanks.

Shale shakers are the primary solids separation tool on a rig. After returning to the surface of the well, the used drilling fluid flows directly to the shale shakers where it begins to be processed. Once processed by the shale shakers, the drilling fluid is deposited into the mud tanks where other solid control equipment begin to remove the finer solids from it. The solids removed by the shale shaker are discharged out of the discharge port into a separate holding tank where they await further treatment or disposal.

Shale shakers are considered by most of the drilling industry to be the most important device in the solid control system as the performance of the successive equipment directly relates to the cleanliness of the treated drilling fluid.

Mudloggers usually go out and check the shakers for rock samples that have circulated from bottom; they separate the rock from the drilling fluid and take it into an onsite lab, where they dry out the samples and label them according to depth. They then look at the samples and analyze what kind of rock they have at a certain depth, which helps to determine what depth that type of rock was encountered.

== Structure ==
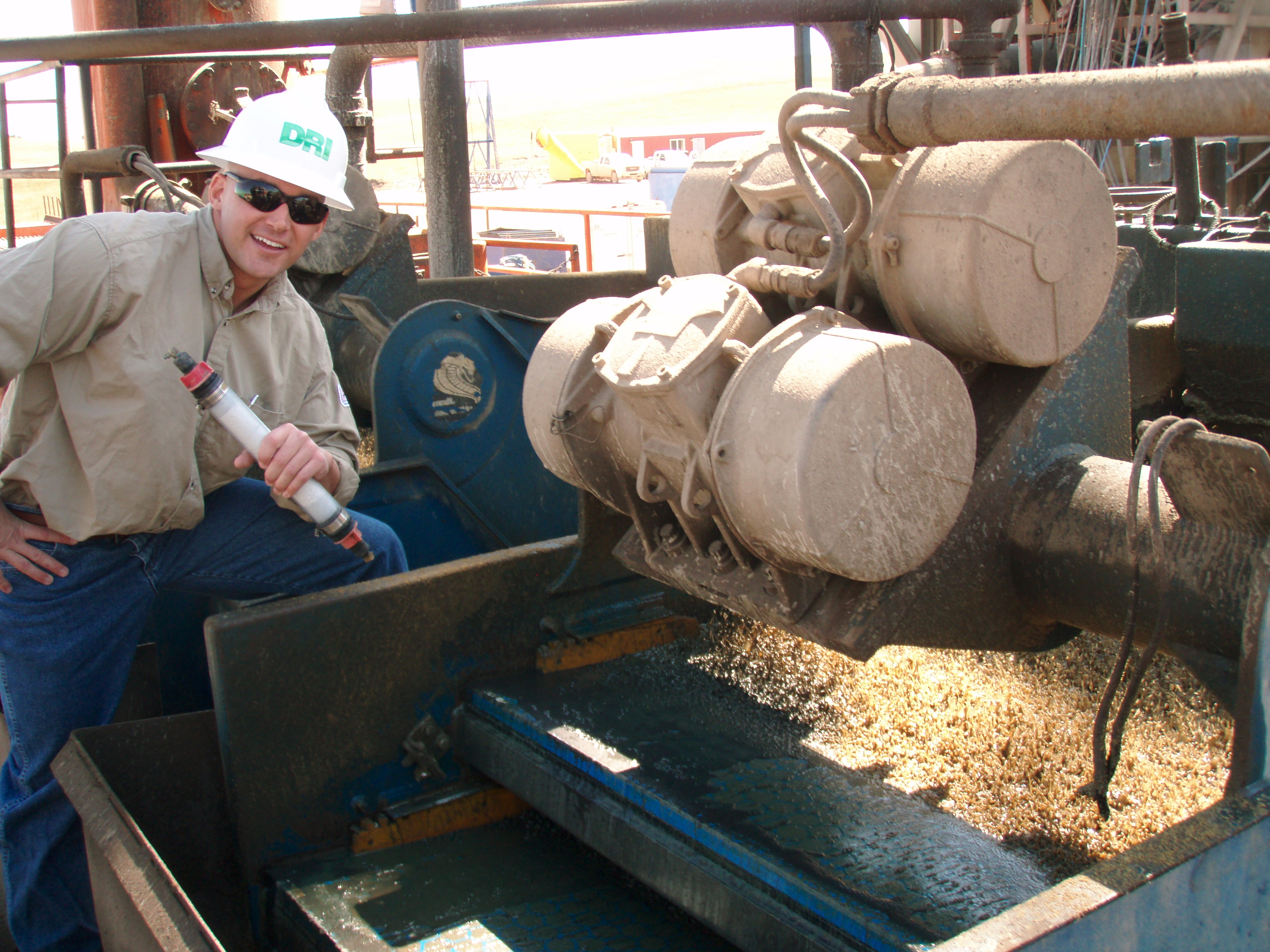
Oil well shaker

Shale shakers consist of the following parts:

=== Hopper ===
The hopper, commonly called the "base" serves as both a platform for the shaker and a collection pan for the fluid processed by the shaker screens, also known as "underflow". The hopper can be ordered according to the needs of the drilling fluid, aka "mud" system. It can come in different depths to accommodate larger quantities of drilling fluid as well as have different ports for returning the underflow to the mud system.

=== Feeder ===
The feeder is essentially a collection pan for the drilling fluid before it is processed by the shaker: it can come in many different shapes and sizes to accommodate the needs of the mud system. The most commonly used feeder is known as the weir feeder, where the drilling fluid enters the feeder usually through a pipe welded to the outside wall near the bottom of the feeder tank: it fills the feeder to a predetermined point and like water flowing over a dam the mud (drilling fluid) spills over the weir and onto the screening area of the shaker. This method of feeding the shaker is most widely used due to its ability to evenly distribute the mud along the entire width of the shaker, allowing for maximum use of the shaker's screening deck area.

Some feeders can be equipped with a bypass valve at the bottom of the feeder, which allows the drilling fluid to bypass the shaker basket and go directly into the hopper and back into the mud system without being processed by the shaker screens.

=== Screen basket ===
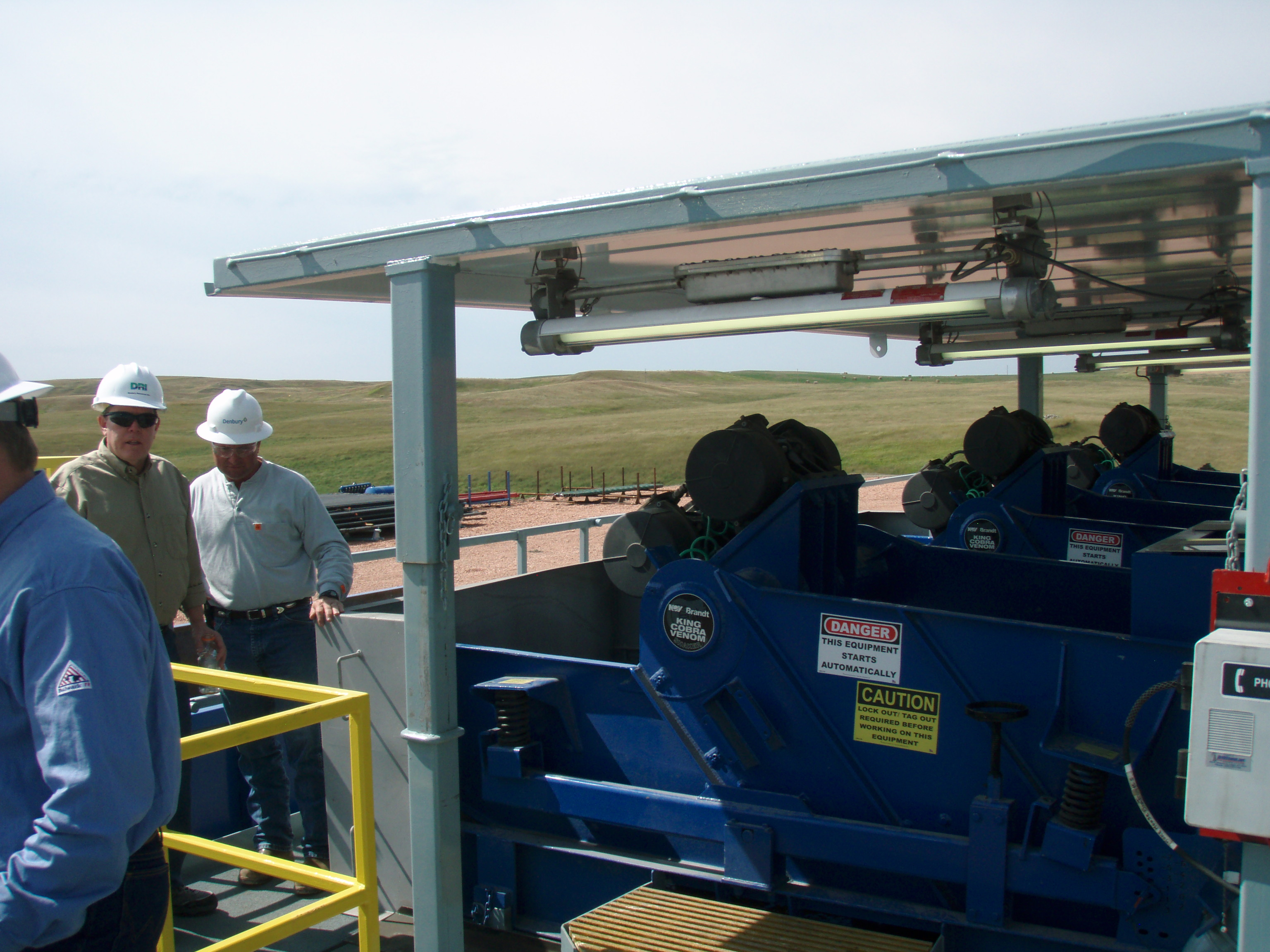
New Shale Shakers

Also known as the screen "bed", the screen basket is the most important part of the machine, since it is responsible for transferring the shaking intensity of the machine, measured in "G's", while keeping the "shaking" motion even throughout the entire basket. It must also hold the screens securely in place, eliminating drilled solids bypass to the hopper and allowing for easy operation and maintenance of the machine. Different brands of shakers have different methods of fulfilling these demands by using specialized screen tensioning apparatus, rubber seals around the screens, basket reinforcement to limit flex, rubber float mounts rather than springs, rubber deck seals, and selective vibrator placement.

=== Basket angling mechanism ===
The shaker basket must be capable of changing its angle to accommodate various flow rates of drilling fluids and to maximize the use of the shaker bed: this is where the angling mechanism plays an important part. The drilling fluid flowing over the shaker bed is designated into two categories:

- Pool: the area of the screening deck that consists mostly of drilling fluid with drilled cuttings suspended within it.
- Beach: the area where the fluid has been mostly removed from the cuttings and they begin to look like a pile of solids.

As a rule of thumb, the beach and pool are maintained at a ratio of 80% pool and 20% beach, but this can change depending on the requirements of cutting dryness and flow rates.

There are various angling mechanisms currently in use, which vary from hydraulic to pneumatic and mechanical: they can be controlled from either a single side of the shaker or must be adjusted individually on each side. Mechanical angling mechanisms can be very dependable, often requiring less maintenance but usually take more time to operate than their hydraulic or pneumatic counterparts, whereas the hydraulic/pneumatic angling mechanisms are much faster to operate and require less a physical means of operation.

=== Vibrator ===
This is the device which applies the vibratory force and motion type to the shaker bed. A vibrator is a specialized motor built for the purpose of vibrating; while containing an electric motor to provide the rotary motion, it uses a set of eccentric weights to provide an omnidirectional force. To produce the proper linear motion, a second counter-rotating vibrator is added in parallel to the first. This is what provides the linear motion, "high G", shaking of the basket.

Some shakers come with an optional third motor on the shaker bed: this motor is most often used to modify the elliptical motion of the basket, making it more circular and therefore "softening" the motion, but comes at a cost of decreased G's and slower conveyance of the cuttings. This motion is usually used for sticky solids. NOV Brandt VSM 300 shale shaker is the world’s first balanced elliptical motion shaker.

== Shaker screens ==
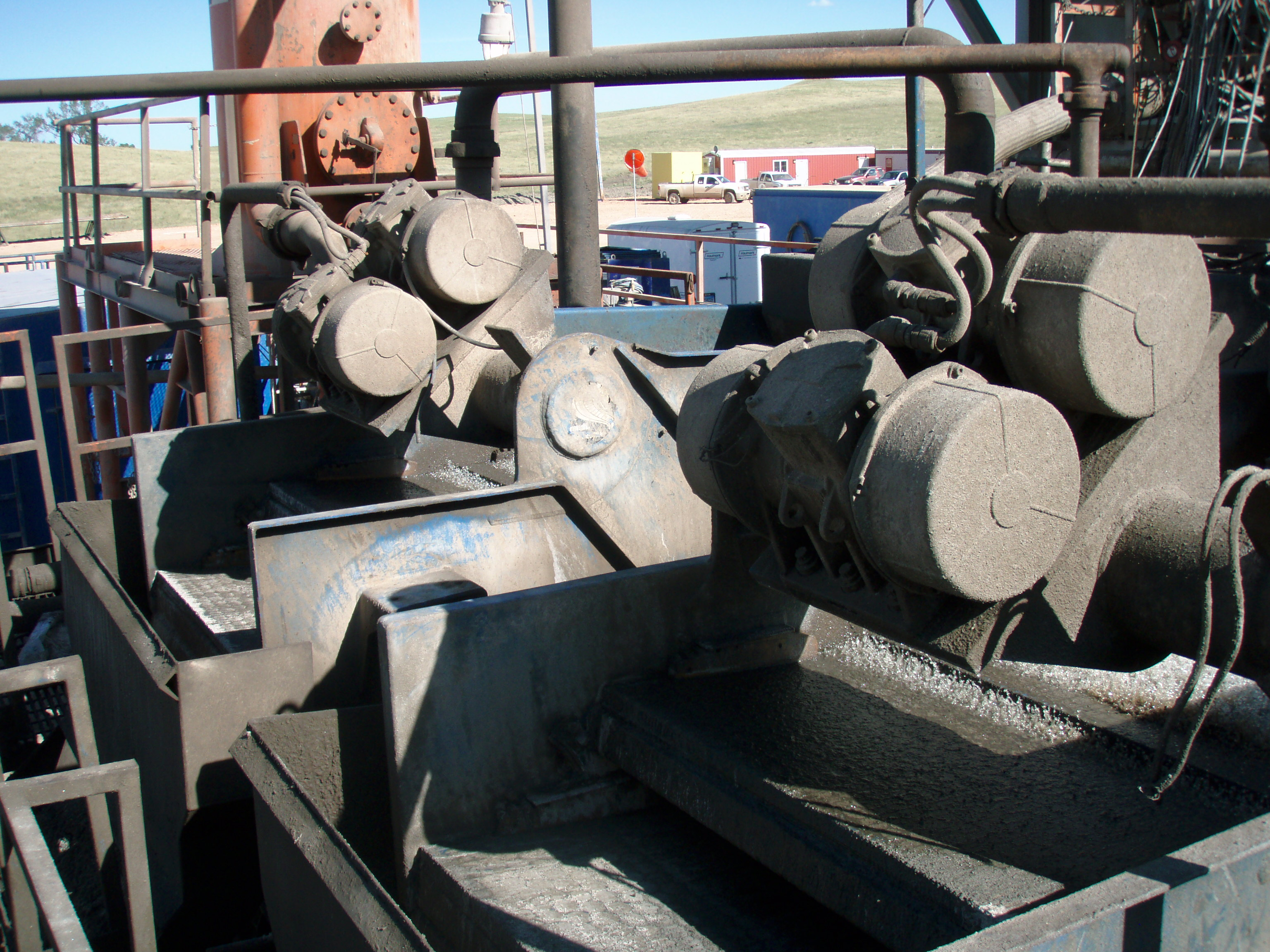
Oil rig shaker

A shaker screen consists of the following parts:

=== Screen frame ===
Much like a canvas for painting, a screen has to be supported on a frame in order to do its job: this frame differs between manufacturers in both material and shape. Screen frames can be made from materials such as square steel tubing, flat steel sheets, plastic type composites, or they can just be supported on the ends with strips of steel (similar to a scroll). These frames consist of a rectangular shaped outer perimeter, which is divided into small individual inner panels. These smaller panels differ in shape from manufacturer to manufacturer and have been known to come in shapes such as square, hexagonal, rectangular, and triangular.

These differing panel shapes are used in an attempt to reduce the quantity of panels on each frame but still provide maximum rigidity and support for the mesh attached to them. The purpose of reducing these panels is to maximize usable screening area, since the walls of each panel get in the way of the mesh and prevent it from being used: this is known as "blanking". The non-blanked screening area of a shaker screen is widely used as a selling feature, since the more screen surface that is available to work, the more efficient the shaker becomes, and it can therefore handle a higher quantity of fluid.

=== Screen mesh ===
Just like thread is woven together to create cloth, metal wire can be woven to create a metal mesh. Screen mesh has evolved over many years of competitive screen manufacturing to result in very thin yet strong cloth designed to maximize screen life and conductance, as well as to provide a consistent cut point. To increase the conductance of a mesh screen, the amount of material in the way needs to be minimized, which can be done either by reducing the wire diameter or weaving the cloth to produce rectangular openings. Rectangular openings increase the screens conductance while minimizing the effect on its cut point, whereas square openings provide a more consistent cut point but offer a lower conductance.

To maximize screen life, most manufacturers build their screens with multiple layers of mesh over a very sturdy backing cloth to further protect the cloth against solids loading and wear. The multiple layers of mesh act as a de-blinding mechanism, pushing near-sized particles that may get stuck in the openings out of the mesh, reducing blinding issues and keeping the screen surface available for use.

=== Binding agent ===
The binding agent is the material used to bind the mesh to the screen frame: it is designed to maximize adhesion to both materials while being able to handle high heat, strong vibration, abrasive cuttings, and corrosive drilling fluids.

Plastic composite screens tend not to use adhesives, but rather heat the mesh and melt it into the screen frame to form a bond.

=== Modular screen technology ===
One of the more recent advances in oilfield screen technology has introduced the "modular panel screen". This technology is an innovative design whereby the screen surface is partitioned into grid sections of modular panels, so damaged sections can be individually repaired to prolong the screen life. Traditionally, a screen is disposed entirely when only 15% screen area is damaged: this approach wasted over 85% of non-damaged screen area, as well as the frame. For oilfield activity in remote environments, the reduction to waste and logistics proved to be a significant benefit.

=== Pyramid Screen technology ===
The Pyramid Screen technology is a method for increasing the screening area of a shale shaker without the need to build larger machines. When seen from the side, these screens look like corrugated cardboard, having a flat bottom and wave-like shapes on top. These waves are designed to increase the surface area of the screen panel by building upward instead of outward, thereby maximizing the surface area of the screen without the need to build larger shaker screens and in turn larger, heavier, and more expensive shakers.

There are many proven studies by Derrick solutions in regard to the reasons for the improved performance of these 3D screens, such as:

- increasing the screening area of each panel transfers the load across more surface area, and therefore the wear tends to be reduced in comparison to other screens;
- the corrugated shape of the screens encourages solids to settle in the valleys of the screen, keeping the peaks of the screen available to process drilling fluid;
- the tapered valleys, while moving under high G's, apply a compression force on the solids similar to wringing out a cloth to draw out liquid;
- increasing the surface area of the shaker allows the use of finer screens earlier in the drilling process, while maintaining acceptable flow rates and penetration rate, which effectively removes harmful drilled solids before they can begin to wear out the solids control equipment.

There are many theories on screening performance that yields inconsistent results. The only way to truly gauge the performance of any screen is to try it out and collect comparative data.

== Causes of screen failure ==
The causes of premature screen failure are:

- Mishandling of screen panels during storage
- Improper handling during installation
- Improper installation of shaker screen to shaker basket
- Over/under tensioning
- Dirty, worn, or improperly installed deck rubbers
- Improper cleaning of the screens while in storage
- Extremely high mud weight
- Heavy solids loading
- Improperly manufactured screens
- Use of high pressure wash guns to clean or un-blind screens

== API standards ==
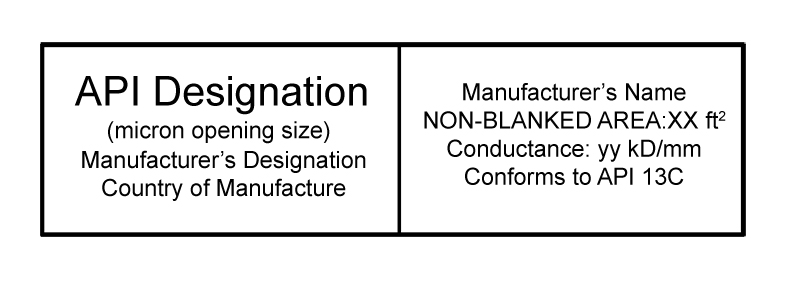
API Standard Screen Identification

The American Petroleum Institute (API) Screen Designation is the customary identification for screen panels. This includes:

- API Number: the sieve equivalent as per API RP 13C.
- Conductance: the ease with which a liquid can flow through the screen, with larger values representing higher volume handling.
- Microns: a unit of length equal to one-thousandth of a millimeter.
- Non-blanked area: an evaluation of the surface area available for liquid transmission through the screen.
