= Vacuum-anchor =

Ocean bottom fasteners used to anchor deepwater oil platforms

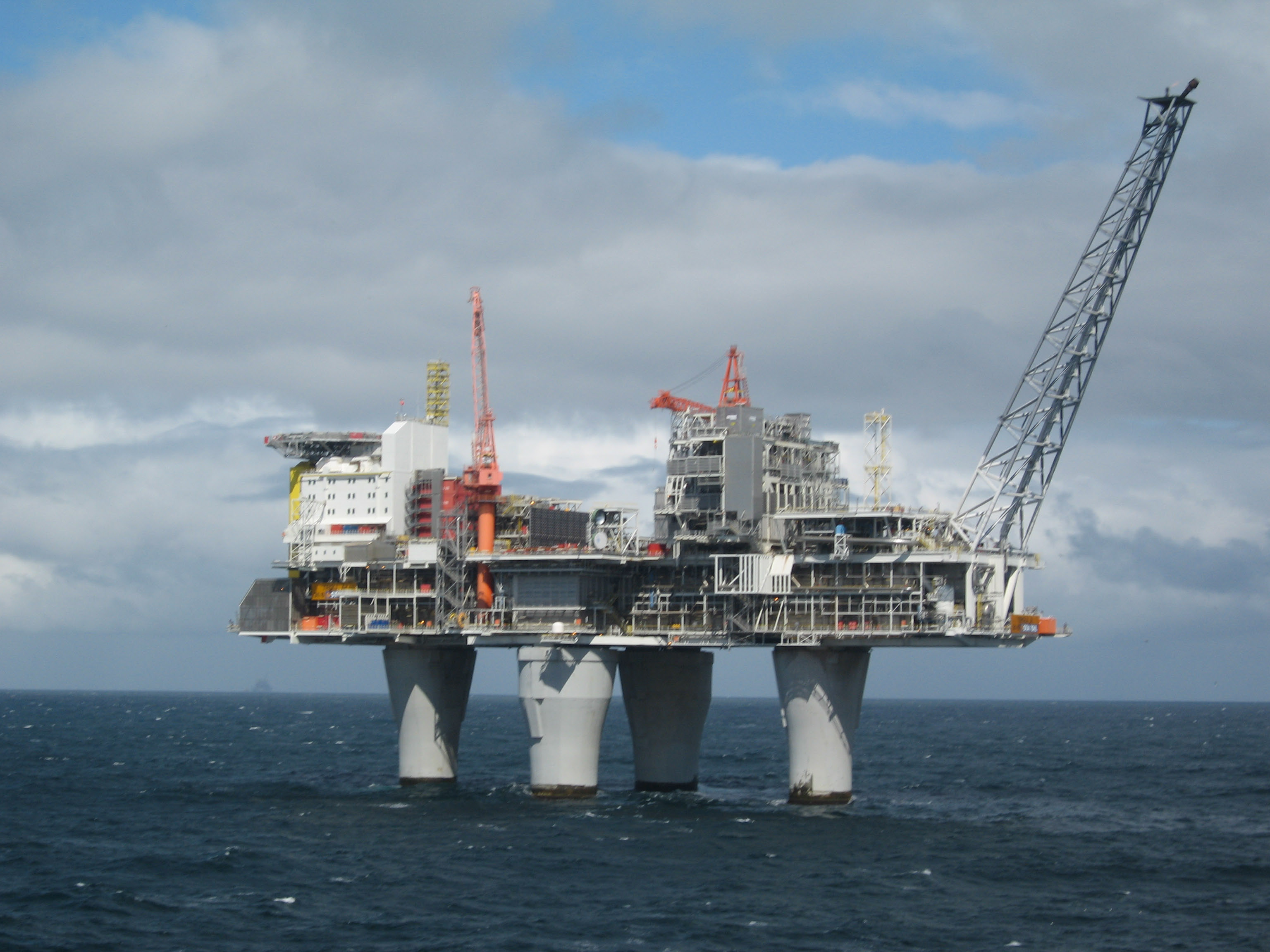
Fifteen storey tall continuous slip formed support legs under the Troll A Oil Platform in 1000 ft (303 m).

In large scale oceanic civil engineering, vacuum-anchors are used to anchor gravity-based structures (such as the Troll A Oil Platform) in the soft bottomed muck found on many oil bearing continental shelves and the world's shallower seas.

This design is modeled on how the webbed feet of aquatic animals increase the surface area on the ground.

The lowest part of the vacuum-anchors forms downward-facing cylindrical cups connecting to the legs of the gravity-based structure. The top of the cups has a valve to exhaust gases and liquids trapped from the sea bottom looking to escape. This is conceptually similar to a tall drinking glass filled with water, then inverted.

When a lifting or sideways force is applied to the cup, the weight and inertia of the enclosed solution must also be displaced. Any material that spills out of the enclosure creates a vacuum that anchors the structure to the soft bottom.

== See also ==
- Troll A platform
- Offshore concrete structure
- Suction caisson
