= Sesam (structural analysis software) =

Sesam is a software suite for structural and hydrodynamic analysis of ships and offshore structures. It is based on the displacement formulation of the Finite Element Method.

The first version of Sesam was developed at NTH, now Norges Teknisk-Naturvitenskapelige Universitet (NTNU Trondheim), in the mid-1960s. Sesam was bought by Det Norske Veritas, now DNV, in 1968 and commercialized under the name SESAM-69 in 1970. Sesam was thus one of the first major structural analysis tools based on the Finite Element Method available and when it came to capability of analysing large and complex structures it outclassed all. In the beginning it was used for analysis of ships, in particular oil tankers (for which a comparison of analysis results with measurements on the real ship was made to confirm the accuracy of the method and tool) and liquefied natural gas (LNG) carriers.

With the development of offshore oil fields in the North Sea in the 1970s the use of Sesam for fixed offshore platforms grew. Examples of such use are the Ekofisk concrete tank of the Ekofisk oil field, the Condeep concrete gravity base structures and the Kvitebjørn jacket in the North Sea.

In the late 1970s development of a completely new version of Sesam started. This version was released in the mid-1980s under the name SESAM'80 and is the basis for today's Sesam. During the 1990s Sesam was further enhanced with a high-level concept modelling technique together with a design-oriented and unified user interface. Analysis features for mooring systems and flexible risers were also added. The software name was at the same time simplified to merely "Sesam".

The development of the recent years with frequent new releases is focused on improving Sesam as a tool for all phases of offshore and maritime structures from design, through transportation, installation, operation and modification to life extension, requalification and finally decommissioning.

Sesam consists of several modules of which the most important are:

GeniE for modelling, analysis and code checking of beam, plate and shell structures like offshore platforms and ships.

HydroD for hydrodynamic and hydrostatic analysis of fixed and floating structures like offshore platforms and ships.

Sima for simulation of marine operations like lifting and lowering large objects in a marine environment.

DeepC for mooring and riser design as well marine operations of offshore floating structures.

Sesam is developed in Norway by DNV with focus on solution of structural and hydrodynamic engineering problems within the offshore and maritime industries. It has been used by the offshore and maritime industries world-wide for more than 50 years.
