= HVSC =

HVSC may refer to:

- High-voltage shore connection, The process of connecting a vessel to the shore supplied power
- The High Voltage SID Collection, both the name of a project to build a collection of music created on the MOS Technology 6581/8580 SID sound chip in Commodore CBM-II, Commodore 64 and Commodore 128 home computers and the collection itself
- Hidden Valley Scout Camp, a Boy Scout summer camp located on the Griswold Scout Reservation near Gilmanton Iron Works, New Hampshire
