= Offshore concrete structure =

Concrete structures used in offshore marine environments

Offshore concrete structures, or concrete offshore structures, are structures built from reinforced concrete for use in the offshore marine environment. They serve the same purpose as their steel counterparts in oil and gas production and storage. The first concrete oil platform was installed in the North Sea in the Ekofisk oil field in 1973 by Phillips Petroleum, and they have become a significant part of the marine construction industry. Since then at least 47 major concrete offshore structures have been built.

Concrete offshore structures are mostly used in the petroleum industry as drilling, extraction or storage units for crude oil or natural gas. These large structures house machinery and equipment used to drill for, or extract, oil and gas. Concrete offshore structures are not limited to applications within the oil and gas industry, several conceptual studies have shown that concrete support structures for offshore wind turbines can be competitive compared to the more common steel structures, especially for greater water depths.

Depending on the circumstances, platforms may be attached to the ocean floor, consist of an artificial island, or be floating. Generally, offshore concrete structures are classified into fixed and floating structures. Fixed structures are mostly built as concrete gravity based structures (CGS, also termed as caisson type), where the loads bear down directly on the uppermost layers as soil pressure. The caisson provides buoyancy during construction and towing and acts also as a foundation structure in the operation phase. Furthermore, the caisson could be used as storage volume for oil or other liquids. Floating units may be held in position by anchored wires or chains in a spread mooring pattern. Because of the low stiffness in those systems, the natural frequency is low and the structure can move with all six degrees of freedom. Floating units serve as production units, storage and offloading units (FSO) or for crude oil or as terminals for liquefied natural gas (LNG). A more recent development is concrete sub-sea structures.

Concrete offshore structures are highly durable, constructed of low-maintenance material, suitable for harsh and/or arctic environment (like ice and seismic regions), can carry heavy topsides, may be designed to provide storage capacity, can be suitable for soft ground and are economical for water depths larger than 150 m. Most gravity-type platforms need no additional fixing because of their large foundation dimensions and extremely high weight.

== Fixed structures ==
Since the 1970s, several fixed concrete platform designs have been developed. Most of the designs have in common a base caisson (normally for storage of oil) and shafts penetrating the water surface to carry the topside. In the shafts normally utility systems for offloading, drilling, draw down and ballast are put up.

Concrete offshore platforms of the gravity-base type are almost always constructed in their vertical attitude. This allows the inshore installation of deck girders and equipment and the later transport of the whole structure to the installation site.

The most common concrete designs are:

- Condeep (with one, two, three or four columns)
- ANDOC (with four columns)
- Sea Tank (with two or four columns)
- C G Doris
- Arup Concrete Gravity Substructure (CGS)

=== Condeep Type ===
Condeep refers to a make of gravity base structure for oil platforms invented by Olav Mo and fabricated by Norwegian Contractors in Norway. Condeep usually consists of a base of concrete oil storage tanks from which one, three or four concrete shafts rise. The original Condeep always rests on the sea floor, and the shafts rise to about 30m above the sea level. The platform deck itself is not a part of the construction. The Condeep Platforms Brent B (1975) and Brent D (1976) were designed for a water depth of 142m in the Brent oilfield operated by Shell. Their main mass is represented by the storage tank (ca. 100m diameter and 56m high, consisting of 19 cylindrical compartments with 20m diameter). Three of the cells are extended into shafts tapering off at the surface and carrying a steel deck. The tanks serve as storage of crude oil in the operation phase. During the installation these tanks have been used as ballast compartment. Among the largest Condeep type platform are the Troll A platform and the Gullfaks C. Troll A was built within four years and deployed in 1995 to produce gas from the Troll oil field which was developed by Norske Shell, since 1996 operated by Statoil. A detailed overview about Condeep platforms is given in a separate article.

Concrete Gravity Base Structures (CGBS) is a further development of the first-generation Condeep drilling/production platforms installed in the North Sea between the late 1970s and mid '90s. The CGBS have no oil storage facilities and the topside installations will be carried out in the field by a float-over mating method. Current or most recent projects are:

- Sakhalin-II platforms (Piltun-Astokhskoye B (PA-B) platform and Lunskoye (LUN-A) platform)

=== C G DORIS Type ===
The first concrete gravity platform in the North Sea was a C G Doris platform, the Ekofisk Tank, in Norwegian waters. The structure has a shape not unlike a marine sea island and is surrounded by a perforated breakwater wall (Jarlan patent). The original proposal of the French group C G DORIS (Compagnie General pour les Developments Operationelles des Richesses Sous-Marines) for a prestressed post-tensioned concrete "island" structure was adopted on cost and operational grounds. DORIS was general contractor responsible for the structural design: the concrete design was prepared and supervised on behalf of DORIS by Europe-Etudes. Further example for the C G DORIS designs are the Frigg platforms, the Ninian Central Platform and the Schwedeneck platforms. The design typically consists of a large volume caisson based on the sea floor merging into a monolithic structure, which is offering the base for the deck. The single main leg is surrounded by an outer breaker wall perforated with so called Jarlan holes. This wall is intended to break up waves, thus reducing their forces.

=== McAlpine/Sea Tank ===
This design is quite similar to the Condeep type.

=== ANDOC Type ===
To achieve its goal and extract oil within five years after discovering the Brent reservoir Shell divided up the construction of four offshore platforms. Redpath Dorman Long at Methil in Fife, Scotland getting Brent A, the two concrete Condeeps B and D were to be built in Norway by Norwegian Contractors (NC) of Stavanger, and C (also concrete) was to be built by McAlpine at Ardyne Point on the Clyde (which is known as the ANDOC (Anglo Dutch Offshore Concrete) design). The ANDOC design can be considered as the British construction industry's attempt to compete with Norway in this sector. McAlpine constructed three concrete platforms for the North Sea oil industry at Ardyne Point. The ANDOC type is very similar to the Sea Tank design, but the four concrete legs terminate and steel legs take over to support the deck.

=== Arup Concrete Gravity Substructure (CGS) ===
The Arup dry-build Concrete Gravity Substructure (CGS) concept was originally developed by Arup in 1989 for Hamilton Brothers' Ravenspurn North. The Arup CGS are designed to be simple to install, and are fully removable. Simplicity and repetition of concrete structural elements, low reinforcement and pre-stress densities as well as the use of normal density concrete lead to economical construction costs. Typical for the Arup CGS is the inclined installation technique. This technique helps to maximise economy and provide a robust offshore emplacement methodology. Further projects have been the Malampaya project in the Philippines and the Wandoo Full Field Development on the North West Shelf of Western Australia.

== Floating structures ==
Since concrete is quite resistant to corrosion from salt water and keeps maintenance costs low, floating concrete structures have become increasingly attractive to the oil and gas industry in the last two decades. Temporary floating structures such as the Condeep platforms float during construction but are towed out and finally ballasted until they sit on the sea floor. Permanent floating concrete structures have various uses including the discovery of oil and gas deposits, in oil and gas production, as storage and offloading units and in heavy lifting systems.

Common designs for floating concrete structures are the barge or ship design, the platform design (semi-submersible, TLP) as well as the floating terminals e.g. for LNG.

Floating production, storage, and offloading systems (FPSOS) receive crude oil from deep-water wells and store it in their hull tanks until the crude is transferred into tank ships or transport barges. In addition to FPSO’s, there have been a number of ship-shaped Floating Storage and Offloading (FSO) systems (vessels with no production processing equipment) used in these same areas to support oil and gas developments. An FSO is typically used as a storage unit in remote locations far from pipelines or other infrastructures.

=== Semi-Submersible ===
Semi-submersible marine structures are typically only movable by towing. Semi-submersible platforms have the principal characteristic of remaining in a substantially stable position, presenting small movements when they experience environmental forces such as the wind, waves and currents. Semi-Submersible platforms have pontoons and columns, typically two parallel spaced apart pontoons with buoyant columns upstanding from those pontoons to support a deck. Some of the semi-submersible vessels only have a single caisson, or column, usually denoted as a buoy while others utilize three or more columns extended upwardly from buoyant pontoons. For activities which require a stable offshore platform, the vessel is then ballasted down so that the pontoons are submerged, and only the buoyant columns pierce the water surface - thus giving the vessel a substantial buoyancy with a small water-plane area. The only concrete semi-submersible in existence is Troll B.

=== Tension Leg Platform (TLP) ===
A Tension Leg Platform is a buoyant platform, which is held in place by a mooring system. TLP mooring is different to conventional chained or wire mooring systems. The platform is held in place with large steel tendons fastened to the sea floor. Those tendons are held in tension by the buoyancy of the hull. Statoil's Heidrun TLP is the only one with a concrete hull, all other TLPs have steel hulls.

=== Barge/Ship Design ===
FPSO or FSO systems are typically barge/ship-shaped and store crude oil in tanks located in the hull of the vessel. Their turret structures are designed to anchor the vessel, allow “weathervaning” of the units to accommodate environmental conditions, permit the constant flow of oil and production fluids from vessel to undersea field, all while being a structure capable of quick disconnect in the event of emergency.

The first barge of prestressed concrete has been designed in the early 1970s as an LPG (liquefied petroleum gas) storage barge in the Ardjuna Field (Indonesia). This barge is built of reinforced and prestressed concrete containing cylindrical tanks each having a cross-section perpendicular to its longitudinal axes that comprises a preferably circular curved portion corresponding to the bottom.

== Major offshore concrete structures ==
Following table summarizes the major existing offshore concrete structures.

No.	Year Installed	Operator	Field/Unit	Structure Type	Depth	Location	Design by	Construction by	Status
1	1973	Phillips	Ekofisk	Tank - DORIS	71 m	North Sea (N)	DORIS		AIP
2	1974	Atlantic Richfield	Ardjuna Field	LPG Barge	43 m	Indonesia	Berger/ABAM		
3	1975	Mobil	Beryl A	Condeep 3 shafts	118 m	North Sea (UK)	NC/Olav Olsen		
4	1975	Shell	Brent B	Condeep 3 shafts	140 m	North Sea (UK)	NC/Olav Olsen	Condeep Group	AIP
5	1975	Elf	Frigg CDP1	CGS 1 shaft, Jarlan Wall	104 m	North Sea (UK)	DORIS		AIP 2009
6	1976	Shell	Brent D	Condeep 3 shafts	140 m	North Sea (UK)	NC/Olav Olsen	Condeep Group	
7	1976	Elf	Frigg TP1	CGS 2 shafts	104 m	North Sea (UK)	Sea Tank		AIP 2009
8	1976	Elf	Frigg MCP-01	CGS 1 shaft, Jarlan Wall	94 m	North Sea (N)	DORIS		AIP 2009
9	1977	Shell	Dunlin A	CGS 4 shafts	153 m	North Sea (UK)	ANDOC		
10	1977	Elf	Frigg TCP2	Condeep 3 shafts	104 m	North Sea (N)	NC/Olav Olsen		AIP 2009
11	1977	Mobil	Statfjord A	Condeep 3 shafts	145 m	North Sea (N)	NC/Olav Olsen	NC	
12	1977	Petrobras	Ubarana-Pub 3	CGS caisson	15 m	Brazil	?		
13	1978	Petrobras	Ubarana-Pub 2	CGS caisson	15 m	Brazil	?		
14	1978	Petrobras	Ubarana-Pag 2	CGS caisson	15 m	Brazil	?		
15	1978	TAQA Bratani	Cormorant A	CGS 4 shafts	149 m	North Sea (UK)	Sea Tank		
16	1978	Chevron	Ninian Central	CGS 1 shaft, Jarlan Wall	136 m	North Sea (UK)	DORIS		
17	1978	Shell	Brent C	CGS 4 shafts	141 m	North Sea (UK)	Sea Tank		
18	1981	Mobil	Statfjord B	Condeep 4 shafts	145 m	North Sea (N)	NC/olav Olsen	NC	
19	1981	Amoco Canada	Tarsiut Island	4 hollow caissons	16 m	Beaufort Sea	?		Removed
20	1982	Phillips	Maureen ALC	Concrete base artic. LC	92 m	North Sea (UK)	?		Removed
21	1983	Texaco	Schwedeneck A*	CGS Monotower	25 m	North Sea (D)	DORIS/IMS		Removed
22	1983	Texaco	Schwedeneck B*	CGS Monotower	16 m	North Sea (D)	DORIS/IMS		Removed
23	1984	Mobil	Statfjord C	Condeep 4 shafts	145 m	North Sea (N)	NC/Olac Olsen	NC	
24	1984	Global Marine	Super CIDS	CGS caisson, Island	16 m	Beaufort Sea	?		Removed
25	1986	Statoil	Gullfaks A	Condeep 4 shafts	135 m	North Sea (N)	NC/Olav Olsen		
26	1987	Statoil	Gullfaks B	Condeep 3 shafts	141 m	North Sea (N)	NC/Olav Olsen	NC	
27	1988	Norsk Hydro]	Oseberg A	Condeep 4 shafts	109 m	North Sea (N)	NC/Olav Olsen	NC	
28	1989	Statoil	Gullfaks C	Condeep 4 shafts	216 m	North Sea (N)	NC/olav Olsen	NC	
29	1989	Hamilton Bros	N. Ravenspurn	CGS 3 shafts	42 m	North Sea (UK)	Arup		
30	1989	Phillips	Ekofisk P.B	CGS Protection Ring	75 m	North Sea (N)	DORIS		AIP
31	1996	Elf Congo	N'Kossa	Concrete Barge	170 m	Congo	BOS/Bouygues		
32	1993	Shell	NAM F3-FB	CGS 3 shafts	43 m	North Sea (NL)	Hollandske Bet.		
33	1992	Saga	Snorre Concrete Foundation Templates (CFT)	3 cells suction anchores	310 m	North Sea (N)	NC/Olav Olsen	NC	
34	1993	Statoil	Sleipner A	Condeep 4 shafts	82 m	North Sea (N)	NC/Olav Olsen	NC	
35	1993	Shell	Draugen	Condeep Monotower	251 m	North Sea (N)	NC/Olav Olsen	NC	
36	1994	Conoco	Heidrun	Concrete TLP	350 m	North Sea (N)	NC/Olav Olsen	NC	
37	1996	BP	Harding	CGS	109 m	North Sea (UK)	Taylor Wood Eng.		
38	1995	Shell	Troll A	Condeep 4 shafts	303 m	North Sea (N)	NC/Olav Olsen	NC	
39	1995	Conoco	Heidrun TLP	Concrete TLP	350 m	North Sea (N)	NC/Olav Olsen	NC	
40	1995	Norsk Hydro	Troll B	Semisub	325 m	North Sea (N)	DORIS	KCC	
41	1996	Esso	West Tuna	CGS 3 shafts	61 m	Australia	Kinhill/DORIS		
42	1996	Esso	Bream B	CGS 1 shaft	61 m	Australia	Kinhill/DORIS		
43	1996	Ampolex	Wandoo	CGS 4 shafts	54 m	Australia	Arup		
44	1997	Mobil	Hibernia	CGS 4 shafts	80 m	Canada	DORIS		
45	1999	Amerada Hess	South Arne	CGS 1 shaft	60 m	North Sea (DK)	Taylor Woodrow		
46	2000	Shell	Malampaya	CGS 4 shafts	43 m	Philippines	Arup		
47	2005	Sakhalin Energy (SEIC)	Lunskoye A	CGS 4 shafts	48 m	Sakhalin (R)	AK/GMAO		
48	2005	Sakhalin Energy (SEIC)	Sakhalin PA-B	CGS 4 shafts	30 m	Sakhalin (R)	AK/GMAO		
49	2008	ExxonMobil	Adriatic LNG	LNG terminal	29 m	Adriatic Sea (I)	AK/GMAO		
50	2008	MPU Heavy Lifter (Not completed)	Heavy Lift Vessel	LWA	n/a	na	Olav Olsen		Demolished
51	2012	Exxon Neftegas Limited (ENL)	Sakhalin-1 Arkutun Dagi (Golden Eagle)	GBS 4 shafts	33 m	Sakhalin-1 (R)	AK/GMAO		
52	2017	ExxonMobil Canada Properties	Hebron	GBS Monotower	109 m	Canada	KKC/GMAO	KKC	
53	2025	Cenovus Energy	West White Rose	GBS Monotower	118 m	Canada	Arup		

Platform gallery

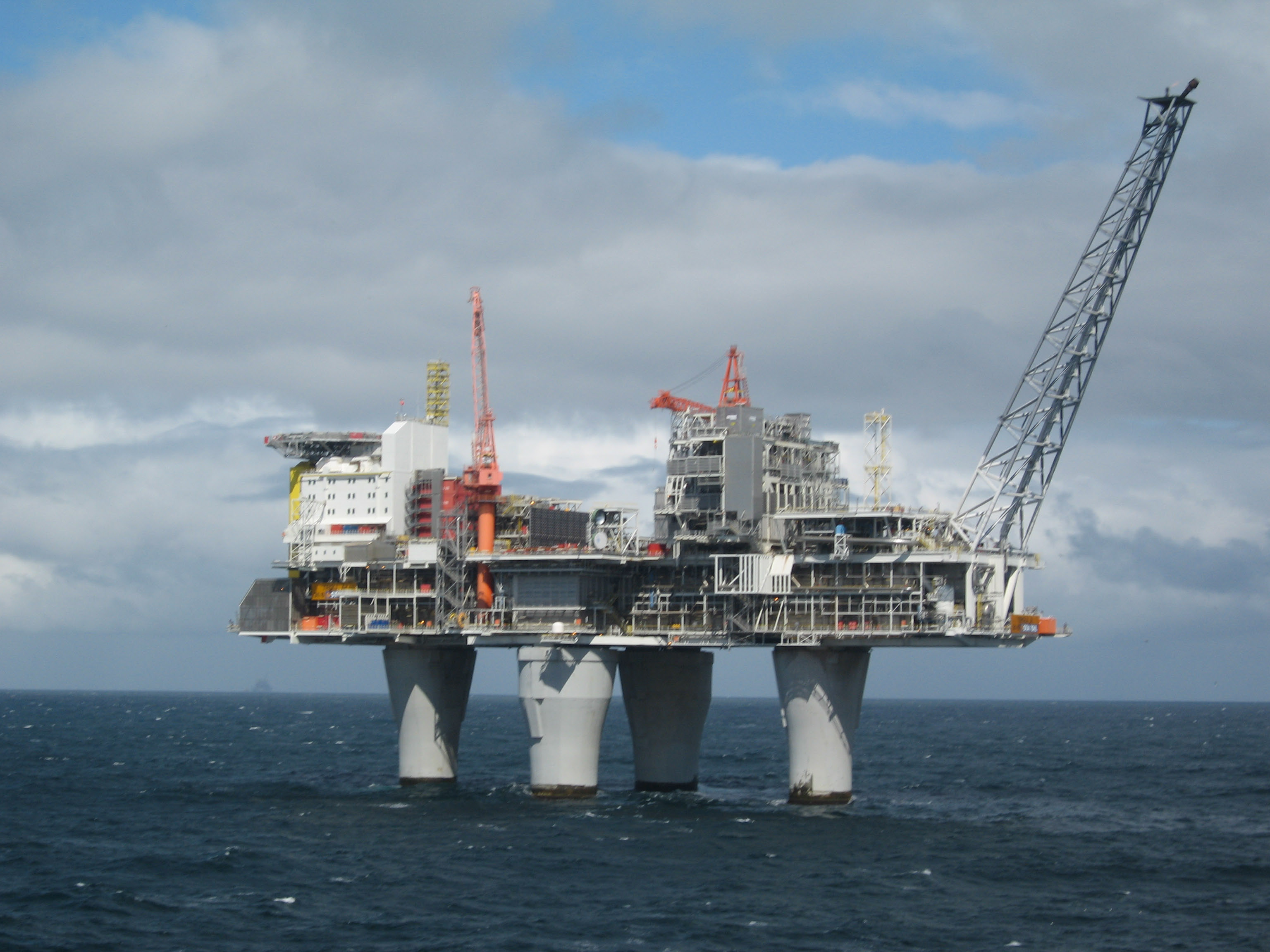
A view from the South East of Troll A Platform

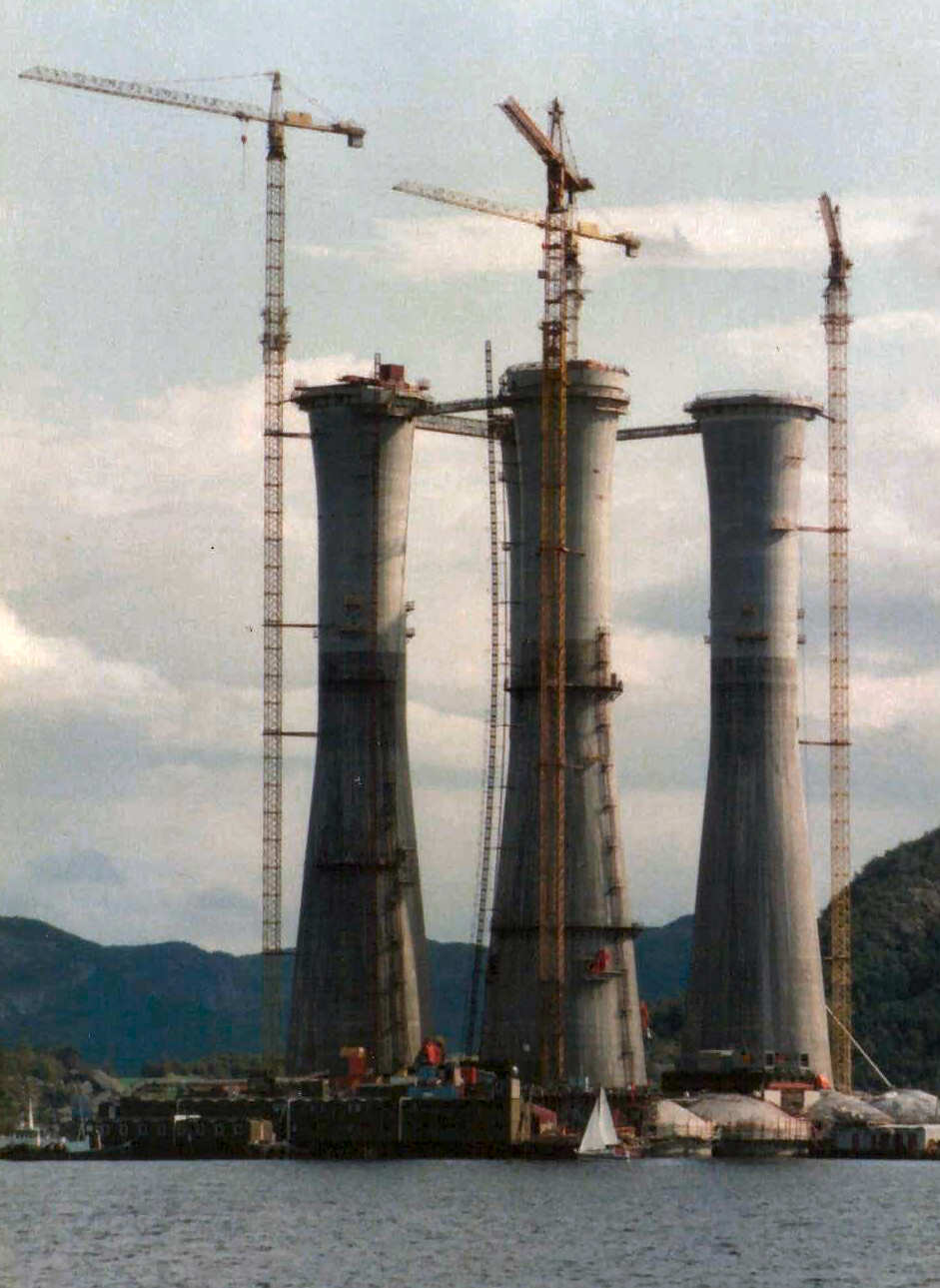
A 'Statfjord' Gravity base structure under construction

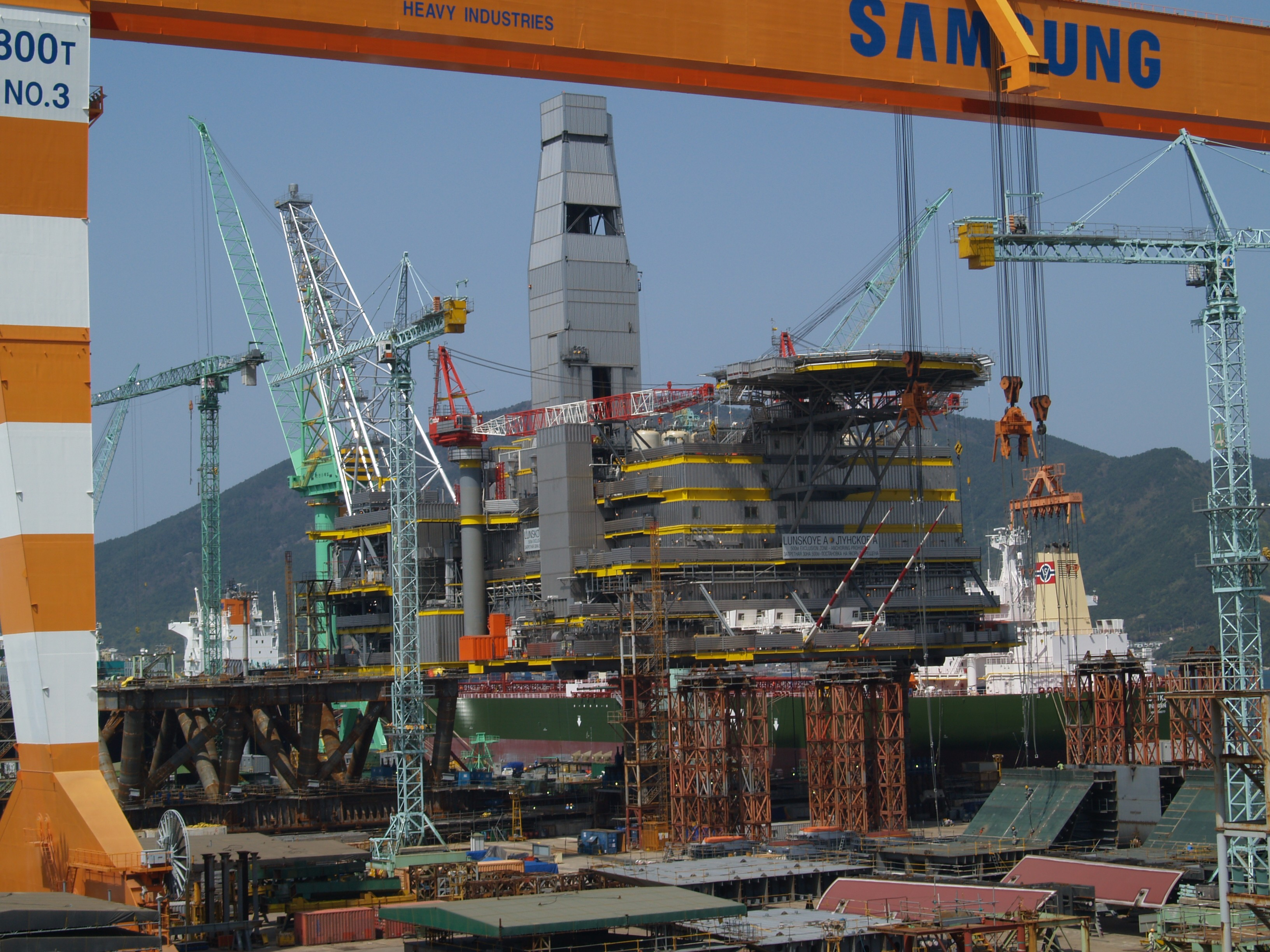
Lunskoye platform under construction
