= Troll A platform =

Natural gas rig off the coast of Norway

Coordinates: 60°38′42.43″N 3°43′29.03″E

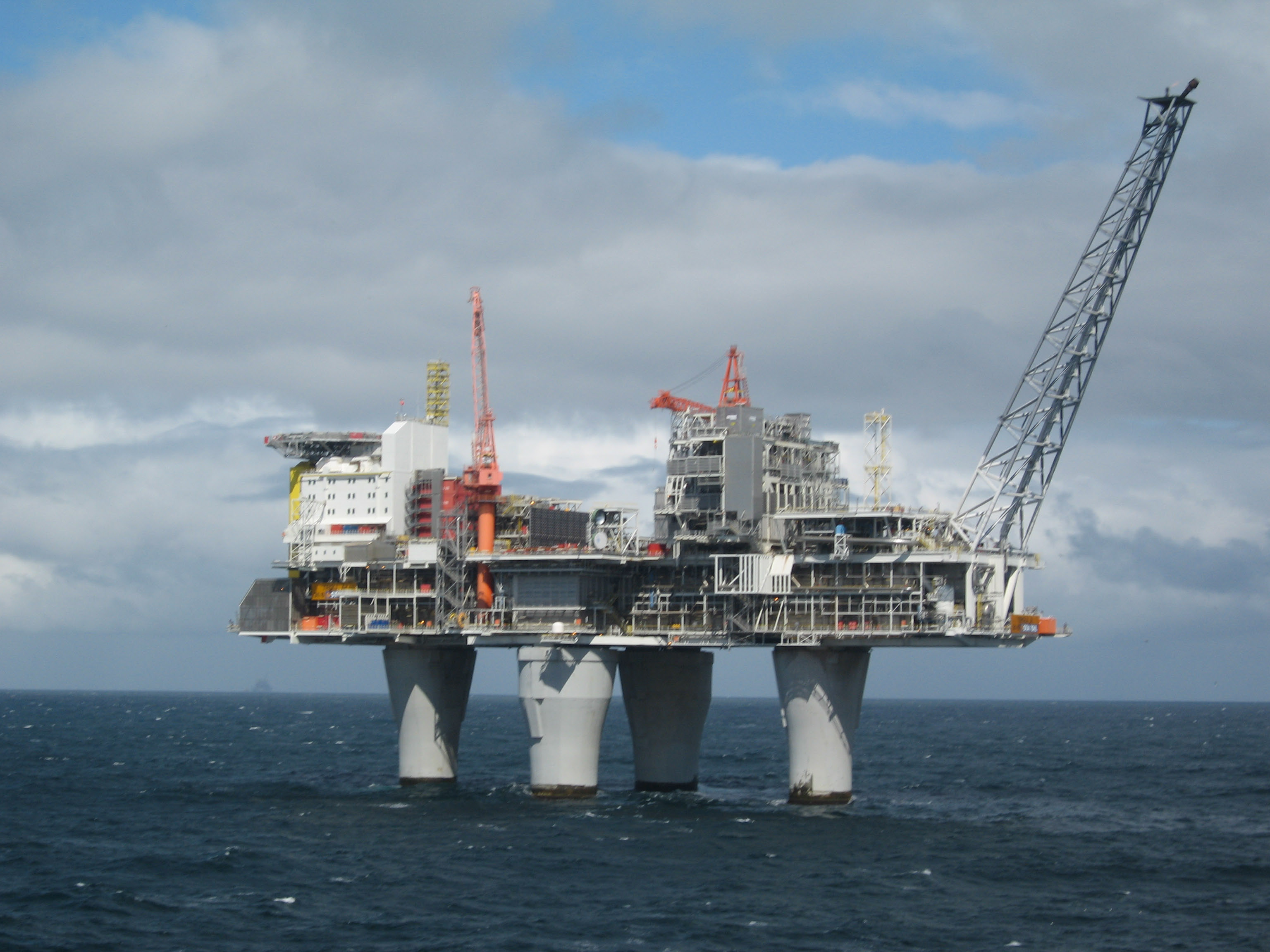
A view from the South East of Troll A Platform.

The Troll A platform is a Condeep gravity-based structure offshore natural gas platform in the Troll gas field off the west coast of Norway. Built from reinforced concrete, as of 2014, it was the tallest structure that has ever been moved to another position, relative to the surface of the Earth, and is among the largest and most complex engineering projects in history. The platform was a televised sensation when it was towed into the North Sea in 1995, where it is now operated by Equinor. It is also the heaviest object moved and the object with the second highest displacement at 1.2 million tons (the object with the highest displacement is the Gullfaks C, which had a displacement approaching 1.5 million tons). Troll A was towed from the afternoon 10 May 1995 until the platform was in place 17 May 1995. It was lowered to the seabed in 303 meters of water, and had penetrated 36 meters into the soil by 19 May 1995. It was self-supporting with no further mooring required.

== Dimensions ==
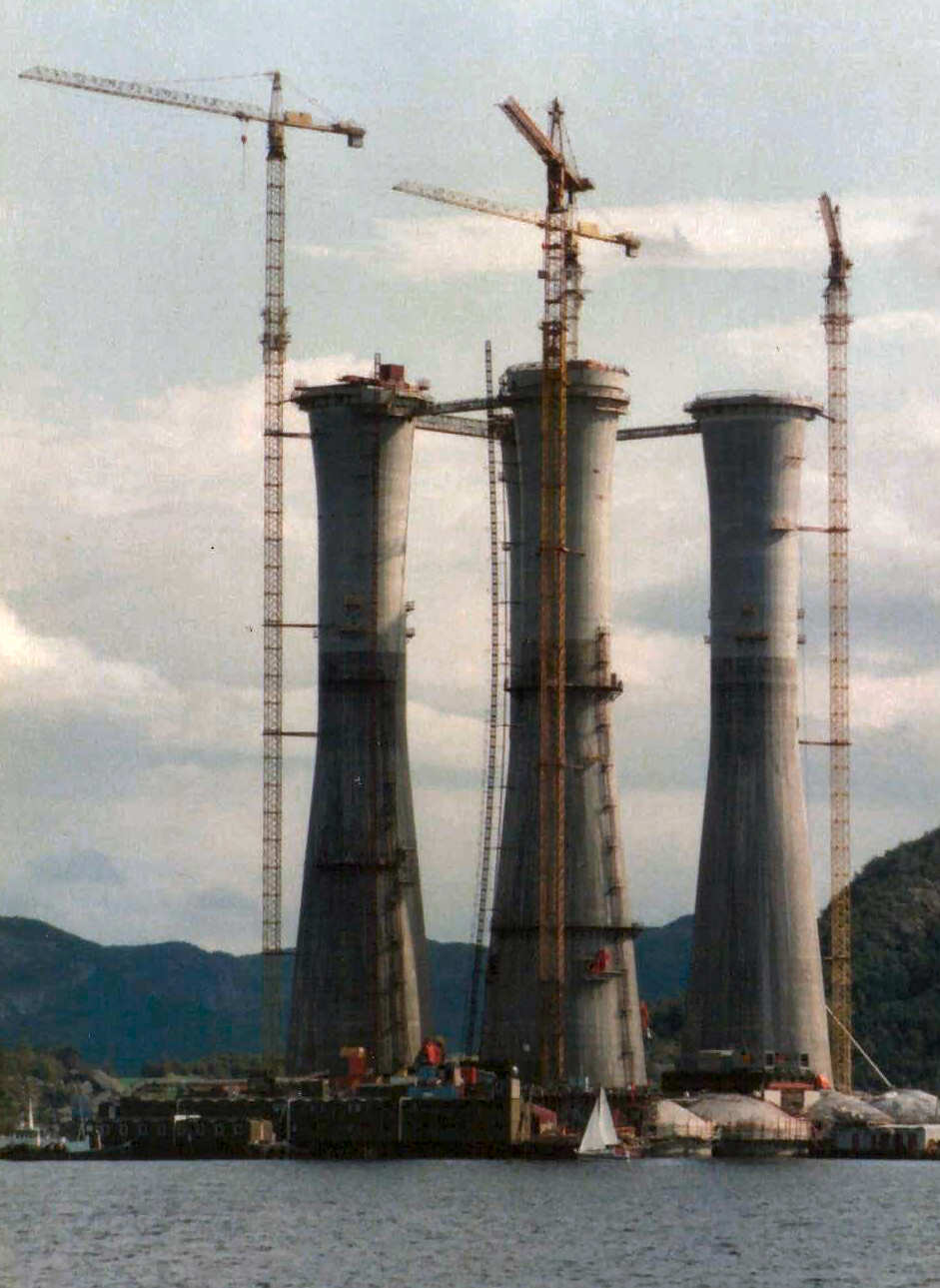
Continuous slip formed gravity-based structure supports under construction in a Norwegian fjord. The tower cranes delivered concrete to the support cylinders during the continuous pour of concrete to create seamless walls.

The Troll A platform has an overall height of 472 metres (1,549 ft), weighs 683,600 tons (1.2 million tons with ballast) and has the distinction of being the tallest structure ever moved by mankind. The platform stands on four legs extending down to the sea floor 303 meters (994 feet) below the surface of the sea, and the leg containing the import and export risers has an elevator that takes over nine minutes to travel from the platform above the waves to the sea floor.

The legs must be able to withstand intense pressures, so the walls of Troll A's legs are over 1 metre thick and are made of steel-reinforced concrete that was formed in one continuous pour – a lengthy process that takes 20 minutes per 5 cm laid. Each leg is a mathematically joined composite of several conical cylinders that flares out smoothly to greater diameters at the top and bottom, so each support is somewhat wasp-waisted when viewed in profile and circular in any cross-section (see picture at right).

The four legs are joined by a "chord shortener" (not present in the picture at right), a reinforced concrete box connecting the legs that damps out any potentially destructive wave-leg resonances by retuning the legs' natural frequencies. Each leg is also sub-divided along its length into compartments a third of the way from each end which act as independent water-tight compartments. The legs use groups of six 40 metres (130 ft) tall vacuum-anchors holding them fixed in the mud of the sea floor.

== Construction ==
Troll A was built by Norwegian Contractors for Norske Shell, with base construction beginning in September 1991 at a cost of 4150 million Norwegian kroner, or approximately US$650 million at the time. The base and the deck were built separately, and were joined in 1998 while the base was partially submerged. The base is a Condeep gravity base structure built from reinforced concrete.

The Troll platform was towed over 200 kilometres (120 mi) from Vats, in the northern part of Rogaland, to the Troll field, 80 kilometres (50 mi) north-west of Bergen. The tow took seven days.

== Expansion ==
In the autumn of 2010, the Troll A platform was expanded with a new module. This module contains living quarters and a new control room. The new control room and expanded facilities are needed to support new compressors. These compressors are needed due to the dropping reservoir pressure in the wells.

On the 18th of June, 2013, the new support module "M12" for compressors 3 and 4 was lifted on board of Troll A. The increased electricity consumption of these compressors required new power cables from shore. Due to grid constraints, the platform is cut off from shore power if a grid emergency arises.

== Operation ==
Gas rises from 40 wells and is exported through a number of pipes to a processing plant at Kollsnes. Troll A has had shore power since connection in 1996. It was scheduled to receive two additional gas compressors to increase production volume and compensate for dropping reservoir pressure in the wells.

== World records ==
In 1996, the platform set the Guinness World Record for the largest offshore gas platform.

In 2006, the 10th anniversary of Statoil's operatorship of Troll gas production was celebrated with a concert by Katie Melua held at the base of one of the hollow legs of the platform. The concert set a new world record for the deepest underwater concert, at 303 metres (994 ft) below sea level.

== See also ==
- HVDC Troll
- Ursa tension leg platform, another, taller record-breaking platform
- Magnolia extended tension leg platform, the world's deepest ETLP
