= Troll gas field =

Natural gas and oil field in the Norwegian sector of the North Sea

Troll field
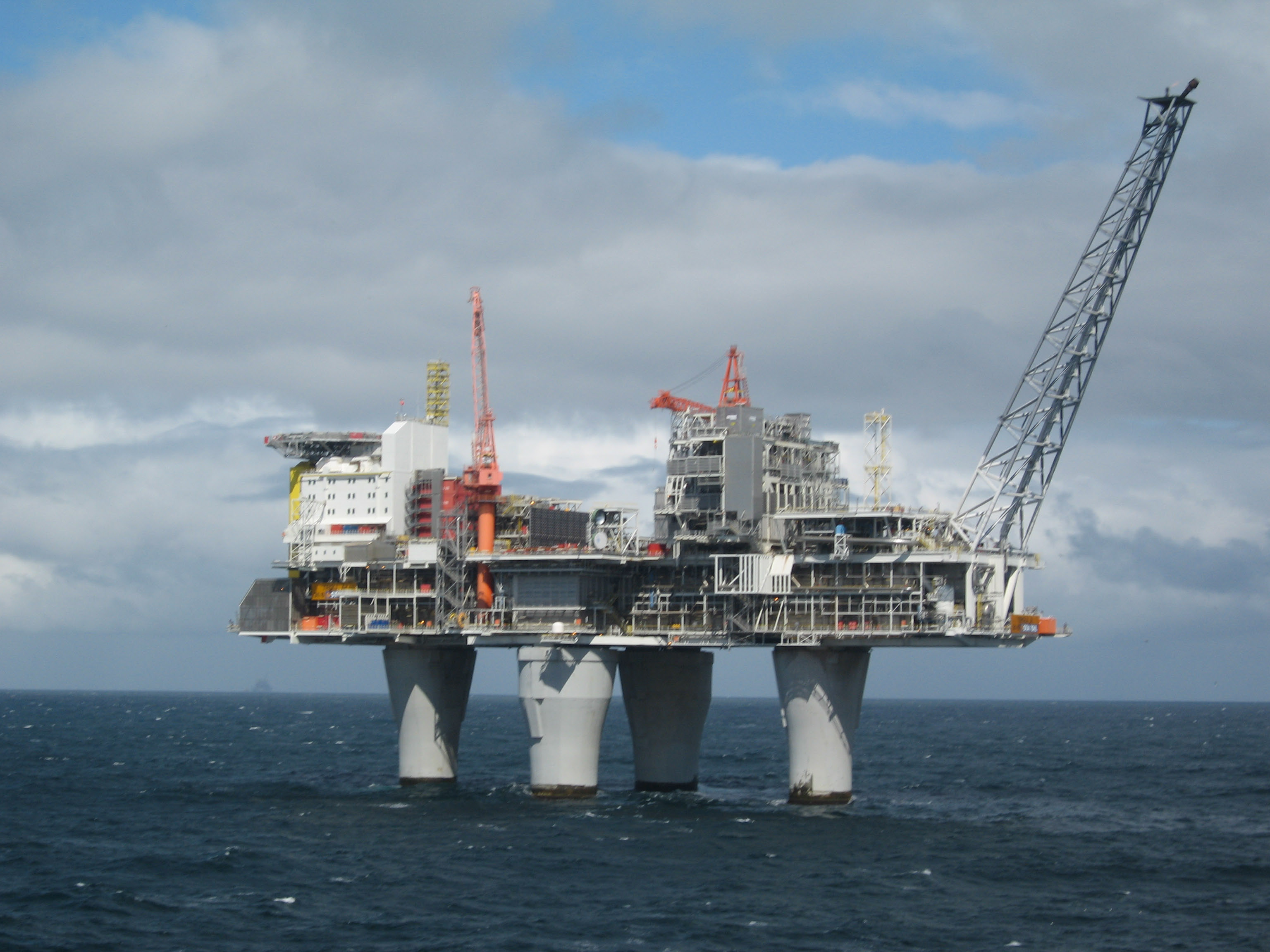
- Troll A platform in the Troll gas field

- Location within North Sea
- Country: Norway
- Region: North Sea
- Location: North Sea
- Blocks: 31/2, 31/3, 31/5, 31/6
- Offshore/onshore: offshore
- Coordinates: 60.645556°N 3.726389°E
- Operator: Equinor
- Partners: Equinor, Petoro, Shell, ConocoPhillips, TotalEnergies

Field history
- Discovery: 1979
- Start of production: 1995

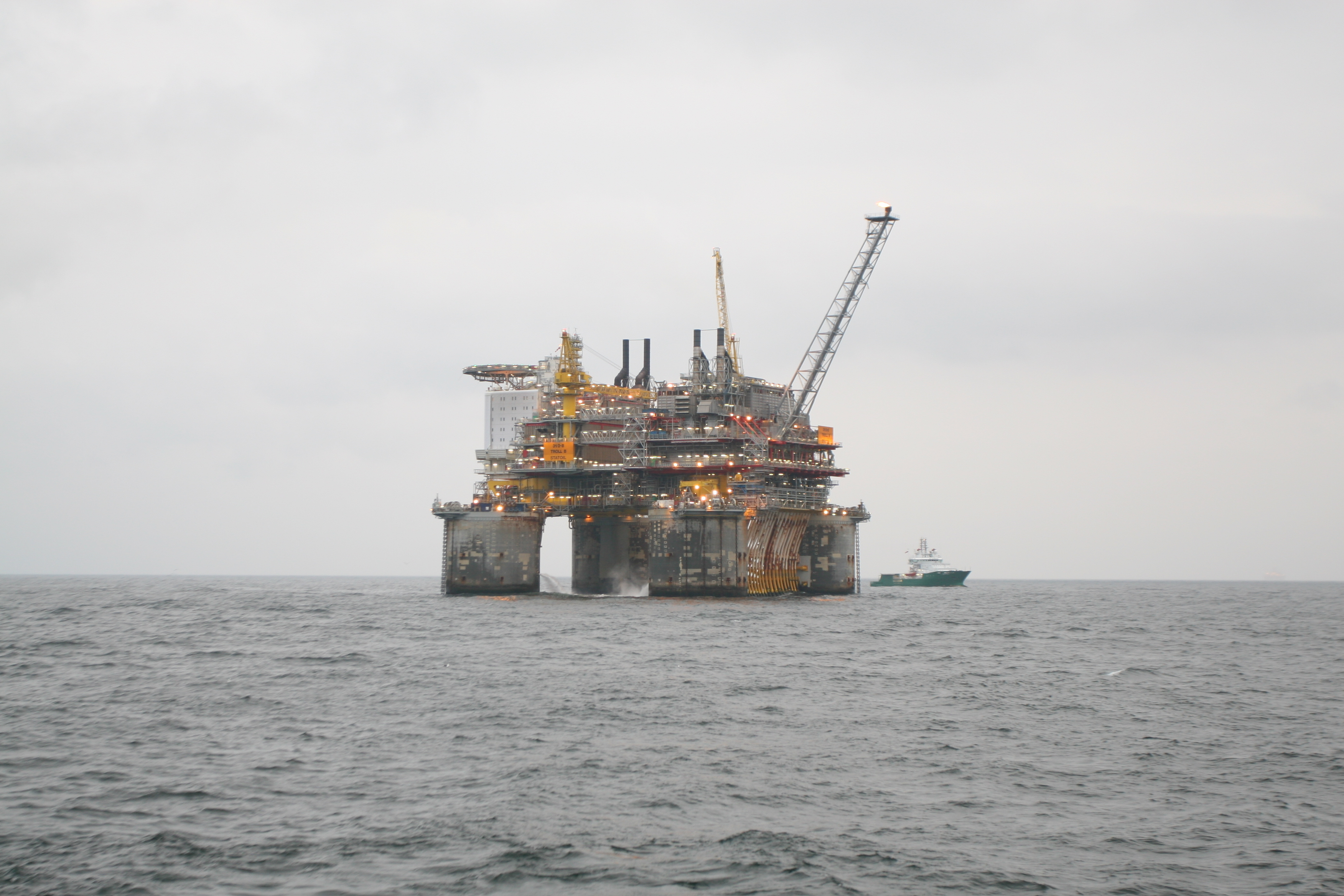
Troll B platform

Troll is a natural gas and oil field in the Norwegian sector of the North Sea, one of the biggest in the North Sea, holding 40% of Norway’s gas – it also possesses significant quantities of oil, in thin zones under the gas cap, to the west of the field. The field as a whole consists of the main Troll East and Troll West structures in blocks 31/2, 31/3, 31/5 and 31/6, about 65 kilometres (40 mi) west of Kollsnes, near Bergen. Most of the gas lies in Troll East.

== Operators ==
The field is operated by Equinor, which has a 30.58% interest. The other partners are Petoro (56%), Shell plc (8.1%), ConocoPhillips (1.62%) and TotalEnergies (3.69%).

== Platforms ==
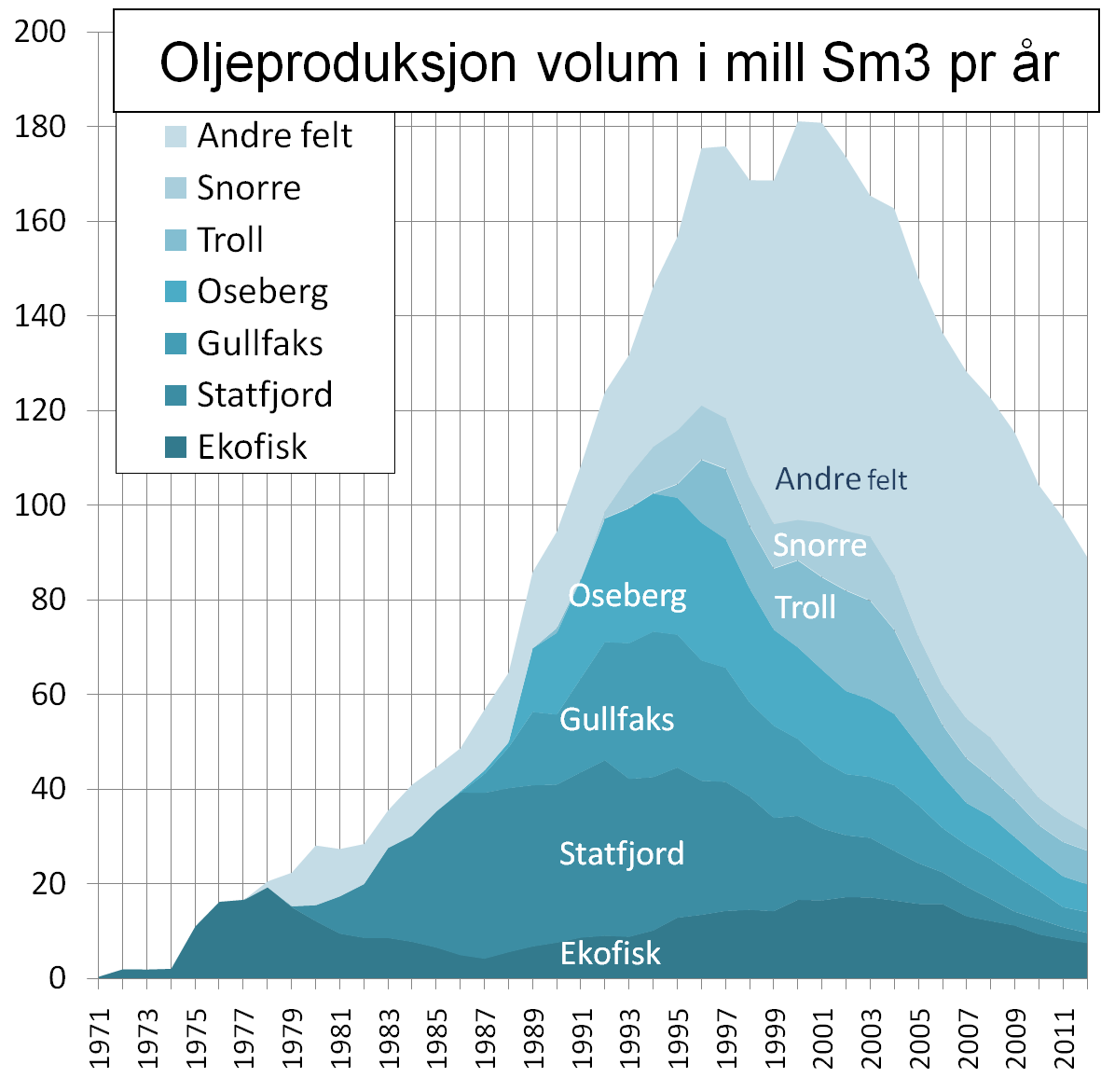
Petroleum production of Norway by year and oil field

Gas and oil from the field are extracted via three platforms – Troll A, B and C.

The Troll A platform, based on the Condeep technology, is the tallest structure ever to be moved. Total weight is 656,000 tons and the total height 472 metres (1,549 ft). The legs extend 303 metres (994 ft) below sea level. This platform came into production in 1996 after being towed out from Rogaland in May 1995.

The Troll B Platform is a semi-submersible designed by Doris and fabricated from concrete; thought to be the only concrete semisubmersible. This platform came into production in 1995. Troll A was electrified with shore power since it started in 1996, while B was connected in 2024. Plans to electrify C was abandoned in 2026.

The Troll C Platform is a conventional steel hull semi-submersible designed by GVA Consultants. This platform came into production in 1999.

== Area ==
Extending across four North Sea blocks, the whole field covers just over 700 square kilometres, corresponding to about 100,000 football pitches.

== Geology ==
The reservoir is located in three eastward-tilted fault blocks 1,500 m subsea and consists of cyclic shallow-marine sandstones from the Fensfjord, middle Heather, Sognefjord and upper Heather formations in the Jurassic Viking Group, and is overlain by Upper Jurassic to Paleocene clays. Located in the eastern margin of the Viking Graben, water depths range from 300–355 m.
