= Cold ironing =

Ability of a ship to "plug in" to power at a dock and turn off its engines

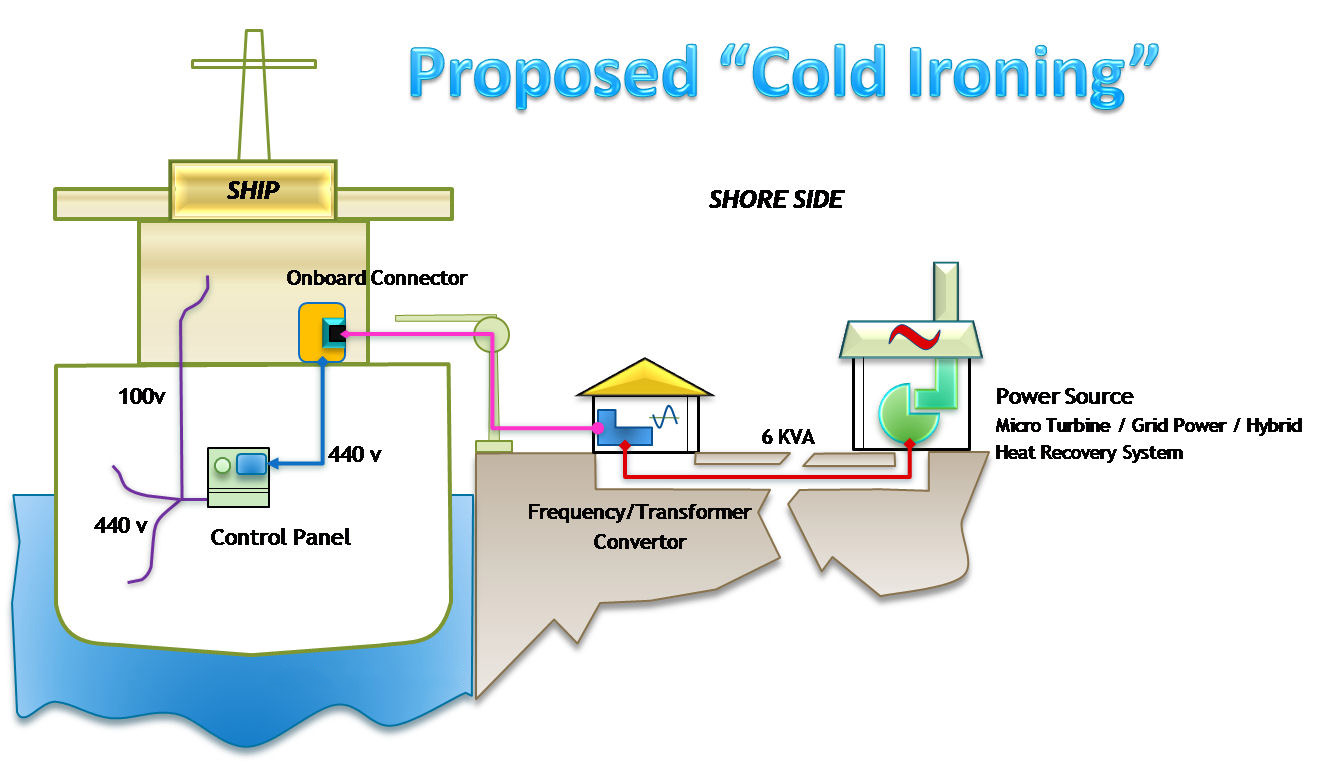
Cold ironing schematic

Cold ironing, or shore connection, shore-to-ship power (SSP), OnShore Power (OPS) or alternative maritime power (AMP), is the process of providing shoreside electrical power to a ship at berth while its main and auxiliary engines are turned off. Cold ironing permits emergency equipment, refrigeration, cooling, heating, lighting and other equipment to receive continuous electrical power while the ship loads or unloads its cargo. Shorepower is a general term to describe supply of electric power to ships, small craft, aircraft and road vehicles while stationary.

Cold ironing is a shipping industry term that first came into use when all ships had coal-fired engines. When a ship tied up at port there was no need to continue to feed the fire and the iron engines would literally cool down, eventually going completely cold, hence the term cold ironing.

Shutting down main engines while in port continues as a majority practice. However, auxiliary diesel generators that power cargo handling equipment and other ship's services while in port are the primary source of air emissions from ships in ports today, because the auxiliaries run on heavy fuel oil or bunkers. Cold ironing mitigates harmful emissions from diesel engines by connecting a ship's load to a more environmentally friendly, shore-based source of electrical power. An alternative is to run auxiliary diesels either on gas (LNG or LPG) or extra low sulphur distillate fuels, however if noise pollution is a problem, then cold ironing becomes the only option.

A ship can cold iron by simply connecting to another ship's power supply. Naval ships have standardized processes and equipment for this procedure. However, this does not change the power source type nor does it eliminate the source of air pollution.

The source for land-based power may be grid power from an electric utility company, but also possibly an external remote generator. These generators may be powered by diesel or renewable energy sources such as wind, water or solar.

Shore power saves consumption of fuel that would otherwise be used to power vessels while in port, and eliminates the air pollution associated with consumption of that fuel. Use of shore power facilitates maintenance of the ship's engines and generators, and reduces noise.

In 2024 Half of all cruise ships can connect to an onshore power supply, a 23% increase from 2023. This is aimed to rise to 76.5% by 2028

== Process ==
The switchover itself is not immediate as they want handover to be seamless for passengers and the ships equipment.

The engine shutdown process starts once the cold ironing equipment is plugged in, and takes around 90 minutes. During this time, the engines synchronize the frequency of the power that is generated to that of the incoming power from the shore, and the ship gradually transitions to using shore power by weaning the "hotel load" (anything not propulsion related, such as lighting, HVAC, galleys, etc.) off from the engine power, before the engines are cut off.

Around 90 minutes prior to departure, the diesel generators are restarted and synchronize their power frequency to the shore power. The process is essentially the reverse of the arrival process, where the ship slowly weans itself off of shore power, before becoming self-reliant on engine power once again.

== Background ==
Unlike navies, whose ships can berth for extended periods at their bases, merchant ships have shorter port stays, during which they sustain electrical loads through on-board fossil fuel powered electrical generators (auxiliary engines). Oceangoing ships have generally not been subject to emissions controls, so merchant vessels throughout the world have been using bunker fuel or HFO – which is residual petroleum – as the optimal choice of fuel. This fuel has high particulate matter. Studies show that a single ship can produce particulate emissions equal to the same amount as 50 million cars annually.

Further research indicates cardio-pulmonary conditions caused by particulate matter from ship emissions are responsible for 60,000 deaths annually. These deaths have been detected far inland due to prevailing wind conditions. The total world trading fleet stands at 50,000+ merchant ships (Lloyds data as of January 2008), and each ship spends some 100 days in port in a year.

For every 1 kWh (3.6 MJ) of electricity, about 200 g of bunker fuel is consumed. Each 1 kg of bunker oil generates 3.1 kg of carbon dioxide. It is assessed that globally ships use 411,223,484 tonnes of fuel annually.

Keeping these reports in mind, new regulatory norms have been mandated by the International Maritime Organization (IMO). The level of sulphur is one of the benchmarks in measuring quality of fuel and Marpol Annex VI requires use of <4.5% sulphur fuel, effective 2010. The target is to reduce world maritime sulphur output to <0.5% by 2020. Some regions (e.g., California) already require ships switch to cleaner fuel when in their local waters.

Cold ironing does away with the need to burn fossil fuel on board the ships while they are docked. Under this concept as it is legally implemented, ships visiting ports are hooked on to local grid power or other power sources, which are already regulated by local pollution norms. This externally sourced power serves the ship's internal cargo handling machinery and hotelling requirements. Effectively, all the power generating sources are shut down and the ship is hence cold-ironed. This brings immediate relief from pollution by shipboard emissions and allows a more holistic maintenance schedule to be followed by ship operators, which are typically hard pressed to maintain planned maintenance schedules due to commercial operating pressures. The immediate result is lowered heat outputs from ships, lowered air emissions, lowered risk of accidents from fuel based machinery, lowered disturbance to the ecosystem, and various others.

== Standards ==
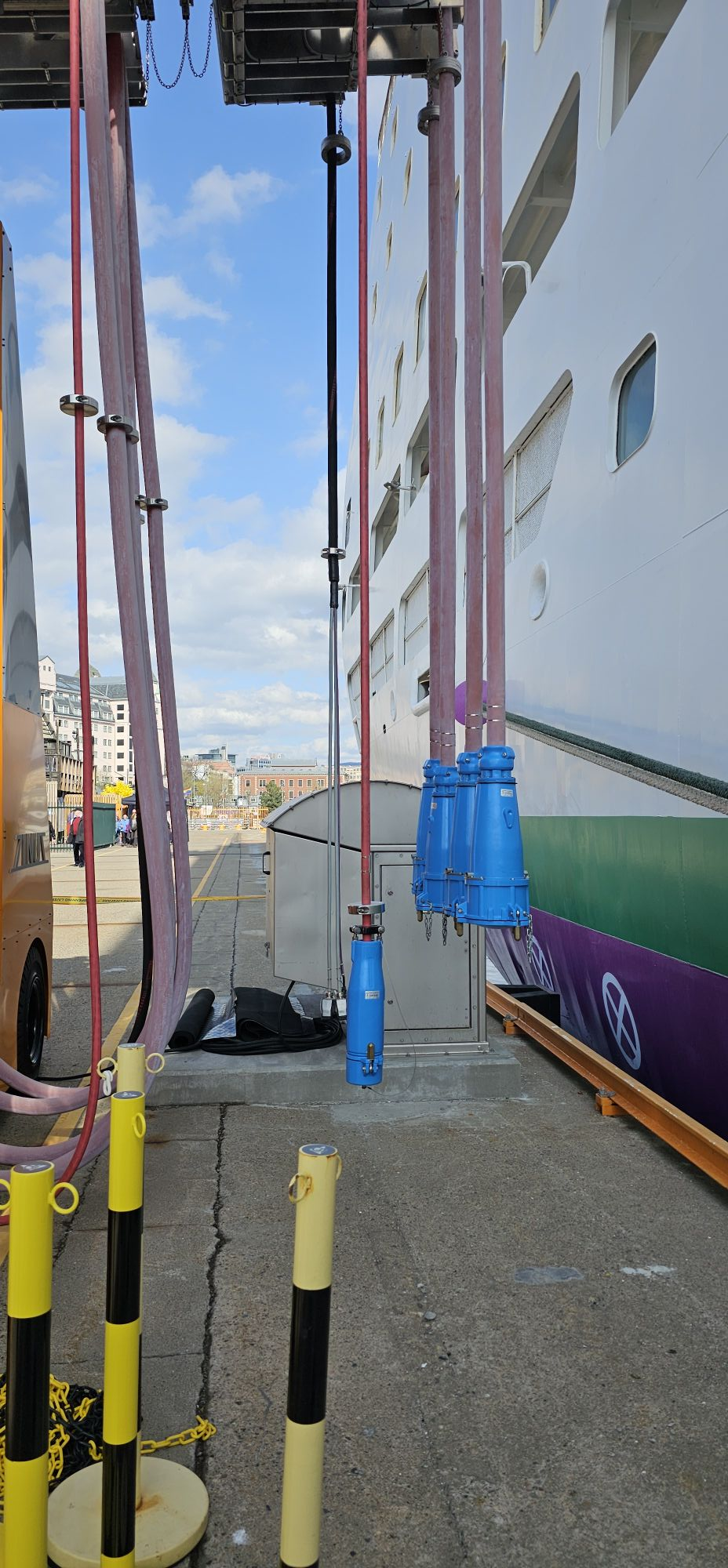
IEC ISO IEEE 80005-1 shorepower plugs ready to be attached to a ship in the Port of Oslo

To ensure ships and docks are compatible a set of international standards have been created known as IEC/ISO/IEEE 80005

=== Part 80005-1 "High Voltage" ===
This standard covers shore power systems for large ships, such as container ships and cruise liners, that need a high amount of electrical power. It ensures that the equipment, connections, and safety features are consistent and safe to use across different ports and vessels.

=== Part 80005-3 "Low Voltage" ===
This standard covers shore power systems for smaller vessels, such as ferries and service vessels, that require less electrical power. It helps ensure that ships can connect safely and reliably to shore power wherever compatible facilities are available.

== Concerns and problems ==
- Incompatibility of electricity parameters: ships, having been built in diverse international yards, have no uniform voltage and frequency requirement. Some ships use 220 volts at 50 Hz, some at 60 Hz, some others use 110 volts. Primary distribution voltage can vary from 440 volts to 11 kilovolts.
- Wide variations in load requirements, from a few hundred kW in case of car carriers to a dozen or more MW in case of passenger ships or reefer ships.
- Connectors and cables are not internationally standardised, though work has progressed in this direction.
- There are other legal implications to outsourcing primary power source. The legal implications stem from possible impact levels in international trade, commercial responsibilities of stakeholders and other risk as assessed.
- Some ports have glass fiber data communication systems installed. The standard for data communication via glass fiber should be as set in the IEC/IEEE 80005 par 2 standard, published in 2016.

All these problems are addressable and work has already begun in reducing ship emissions by cold ironing.

Various studies are being conducted to fully implement a viable, controllable and monitored method of powering the most important arm of modern-day logistics, the merchant ships.

The U.S. State of California is requiring a percentage of ships calling there to use shore power by 2014. The Port of Oakland is implementing a High Voltage Shore Connection (HVSC) at 6,600 volts. The first Hapag-Lloyd vessel to use the system, Dallas Express, docked there in December 2012. The electrical and mechanical equipment to interface the ship's electrical load with the shore power is in a 40-foot container at the vessel's stern. Initially 15 Hapag-Lloyd ships will receive the system.

The Massachusetts Port Authority carried out a study of cold ironing and alternatives in 2016 that pointed out a number of problems, including the high peak power demand (13 MW for a cruise ship, 3 MW for a container ship) and the high cost of providing the necessary equipment and upgraded electrical power infrastructure for Boston Harbor. It also expressed concern about loss of competitiveness without a U.S. East Coast regional agreement to install such systems. The ports of Halifax and Brooklyn have installed cold ironing at one cruise-ship berth each at a cost of $10 and $20 million, respectively, mostly paid by government grants.

== Examples ==
=== Cruise ships ===
- Legend of the Seas - Royal Caribbean International
- Icon of the Seas - Royal Caribbean International
- Valiant Lady - Virgin Voyages
- Joy - Norwegian Cruise Line
- Magnifica - MSC Cruises
- Coral Princess
- Dawn Princess
- Diamond Princess
- Golden Princess
- Island Princess
- Sapphire Princess
- Sea Princess
- Star Princess
- Sun Princess

== See also ==
- Shorepower – for electrical supply of planes, trucks, etc.
