= Slip forming =

Construction method for placing concrete

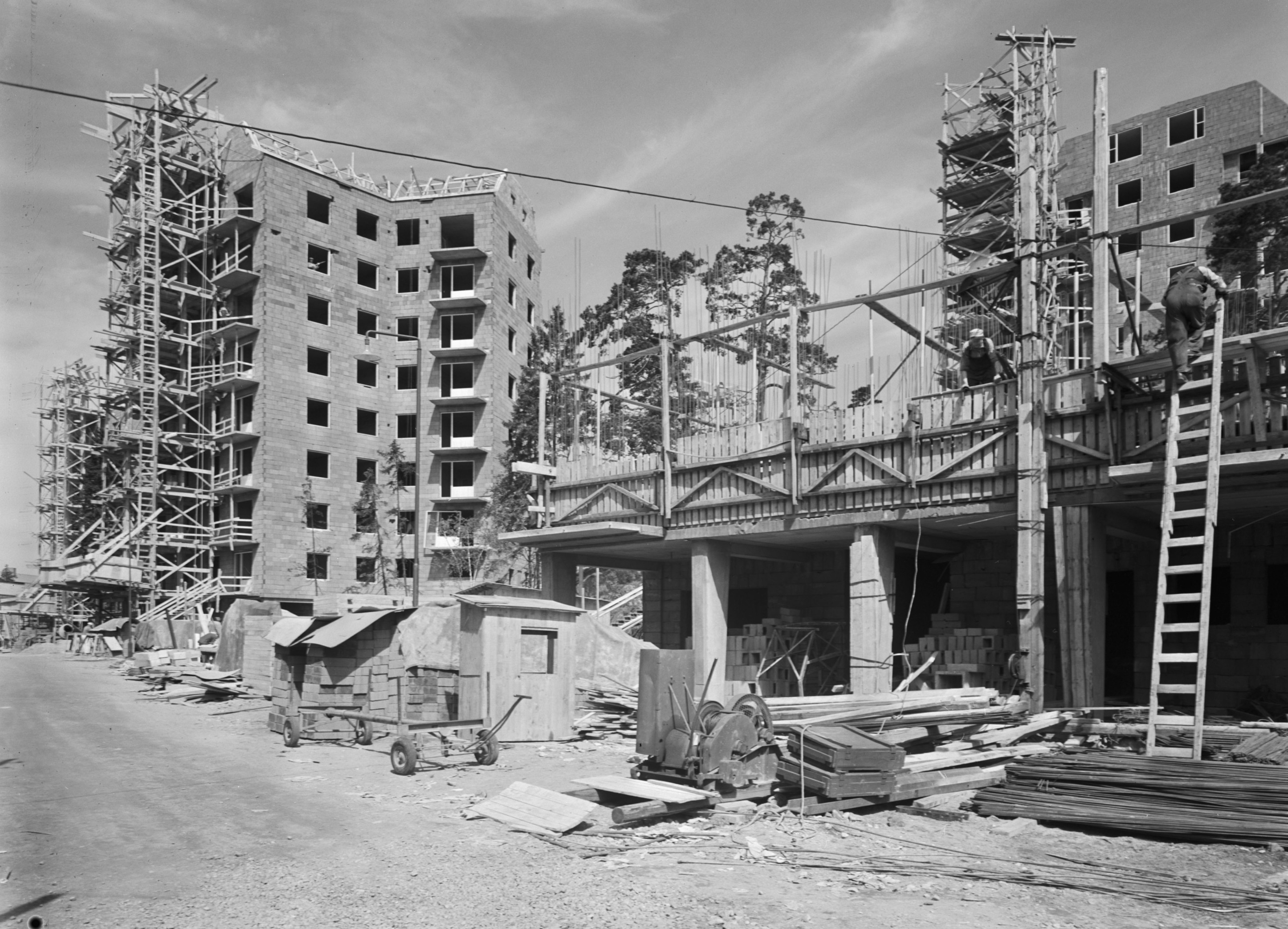
The first residential building of slipform construction; erected in 1950 in Västertorp, Sweden, by AB Bygging

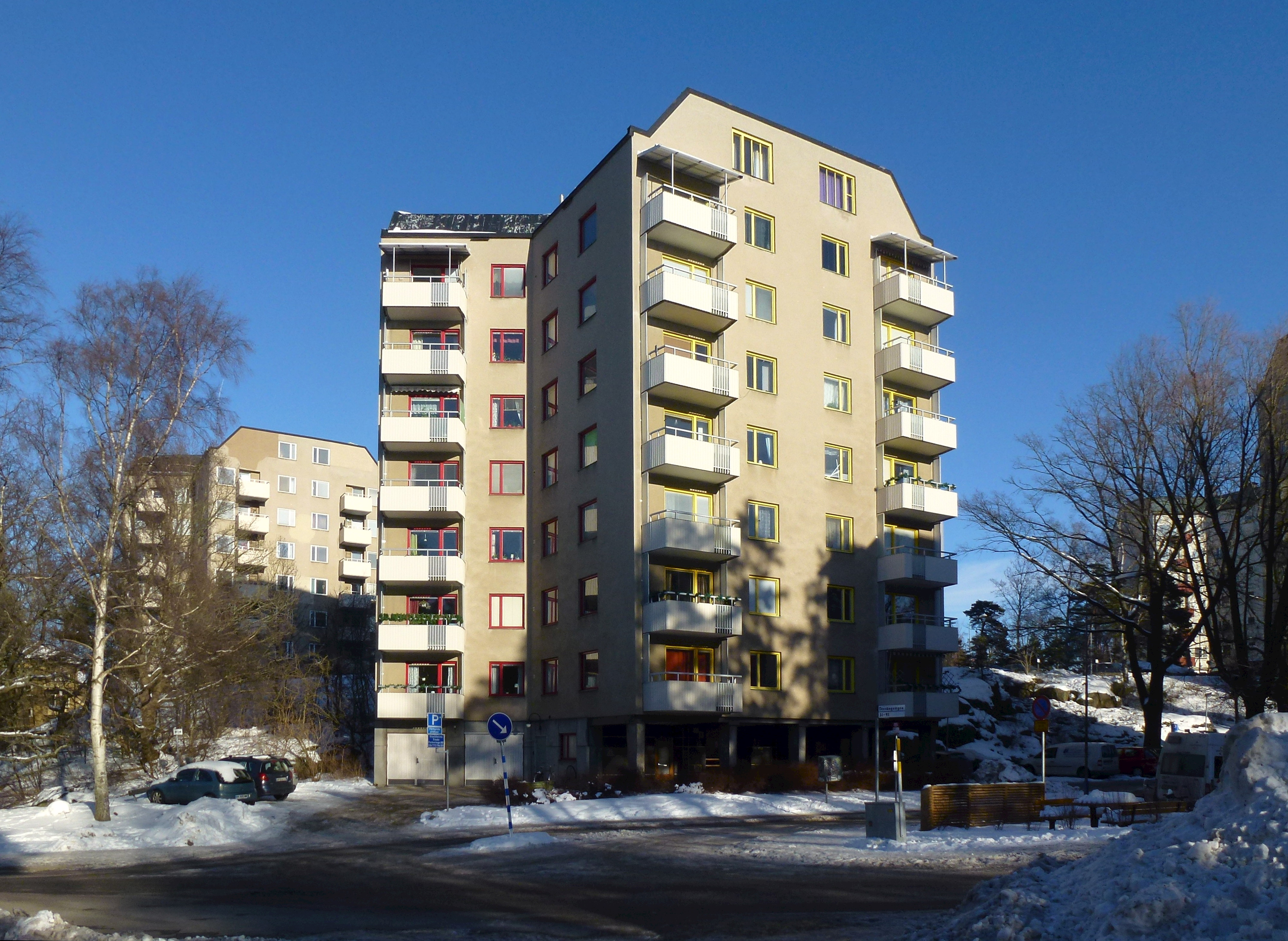
Later picture of the residential building in Västertorp

Slip forming, continuous poured, continuously formed, or slipform construction is a construction method in which concrete is placed into a form that may be in continuous motion horizontally, or incrementally raised vertically.

In horizontal construction, such as roadways and curbs, the weight of the concrete, forms, and any associated machinery is borne by the ground. In vertical construction, such as bridges, towers, buildings, and dams, forms are raised hydraulically in increments, no faster than the most recently poured concrete can set and support the combined weight of the concrete, forms, and machinery, and the pressure of concrete consolidation.

Slipforming enables continuous, non-interrupted, cast-in-place, cold joint- and seam-free concrete structures that have performance characteristics superior to those of piecewise construction using discrete form elements.

== Overview ==
Slip forming relies on the quick-setting properties of concrete, and requires a balance between workability and quick-setting capacity. Concrete needs to be workable enough to be placed into the form and consolidated (via vibration), yet quick-setting enough to emerge from the form with strength. This strength is needed because the freshly set concrete must not only permit the form to "slip" by the concrete without disturbing it, but also support the pressure of the new concrete and resist collapse caused by the vibration of the compaction machinery.

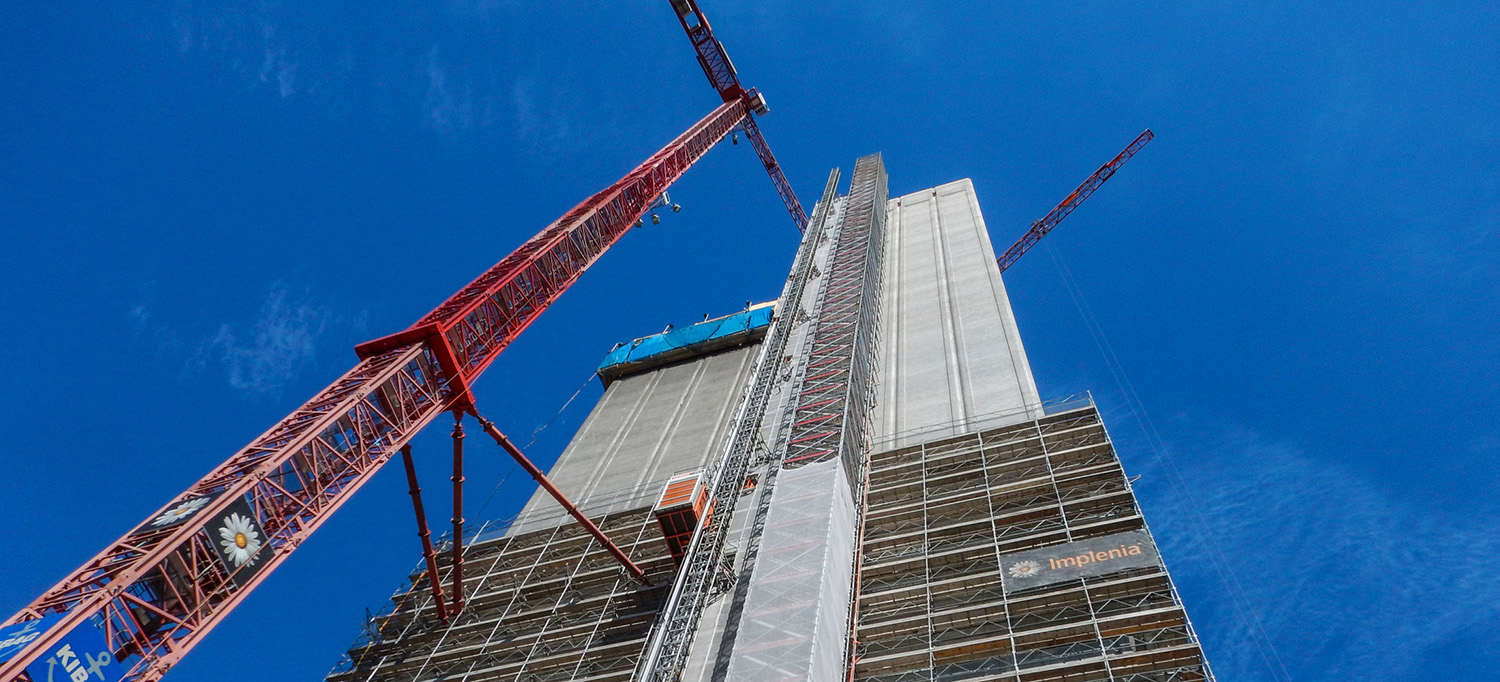
Slipforming of a 118 metre-tall grain silo in Zürich in 2015

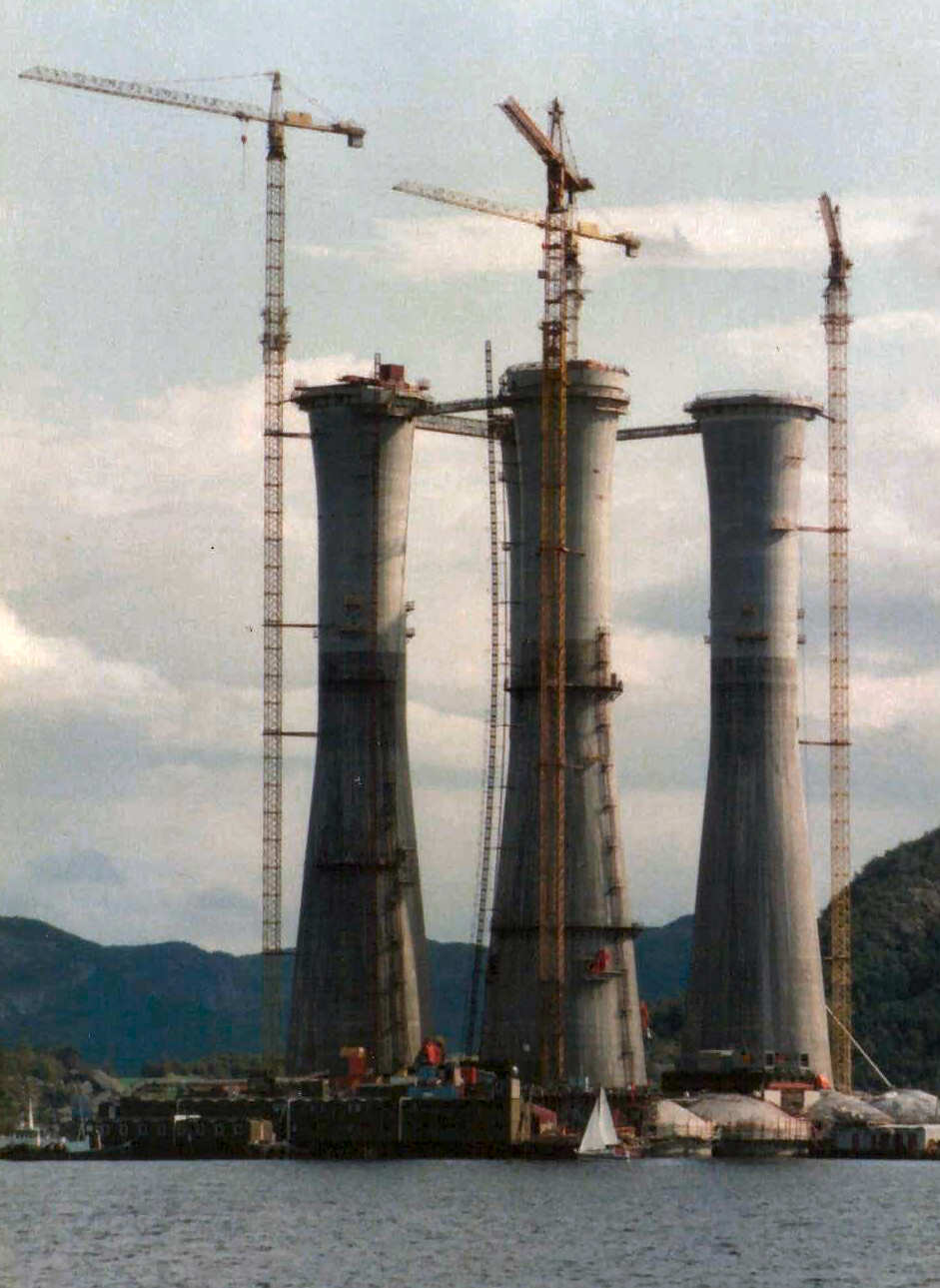
Continuous slip formed gravity-based structure supports under construction in a Norwegian fjord. The visible jib cranes would be delivering buckets of concrete to the support cylinders during the continuous pour of concrete creating seamless walls.

== Horizontal ==
In horizontal slip forming for pavement, curbs, and traffic separation walls, concrete is laid down, vibrated, worked, and settled in place while the form itself slowly moves ahead. This method was initially devised and utilized in Interstate Highway construction initiated by the Eisenhower administration during the 1950s.

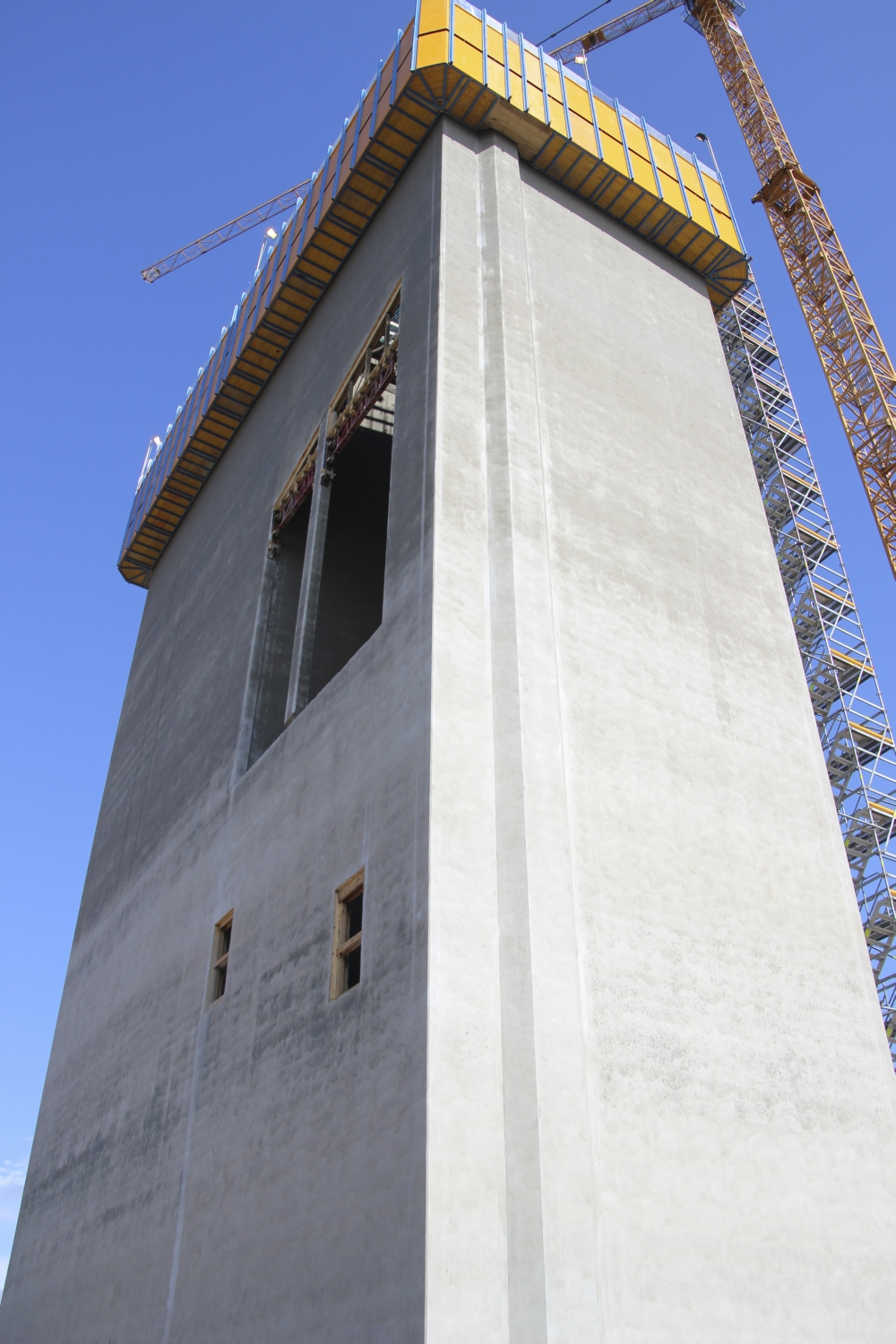
Slipform monobox system

== Vertical ==
In vertical slip forming the concrete form may be surrounded by a platform on which workers stand, placing steel reinforcing rods ahead of the concrete and ensuring a smooth pour. Together, the concrete form and working platform are raised by means of hydraulic jacks. The slipform can only rise at a rate which permits the concrete to harden by the time it emerges from the bottom of the form.

== History ==
The slip forming technique was in use by the early 20th century for building silos and grain elevators. James MacDonald, of MacDonald Engineering of Chicago was the pioneer in utilizing slip form concrete for construction. His concept of placing circular bins in clusters was patented, with photographs and illustrations, contained in a 1907 book, "The Design Of Walls, Bins, And Grain Elevators".

In 1910, MacDonald published a paper "Moving Forms for Reinforced Concrete Storage Bins," describing the use of molds for moving forms, using jacks and concrete to form a continuous structure without joints or seams. This paper details the concept and procedure for creating slip form concrete structures. On May 24, 1917, a patent was issued to James MacDonald of Chicago, "for a device to move and elevate a concrete form in a vertical plane".

=== Silos ===
James MacDonald’s bin and silo design was utilized around the world into the late 1970s by MacDonald Engineering. In the 1947-1950 period, MacDonald Engineering constructed over 40 concrete towers using the slip-form method for AT&T Long Lines up to 58 m (190 ft) tall for microwave relay stations across the United States.

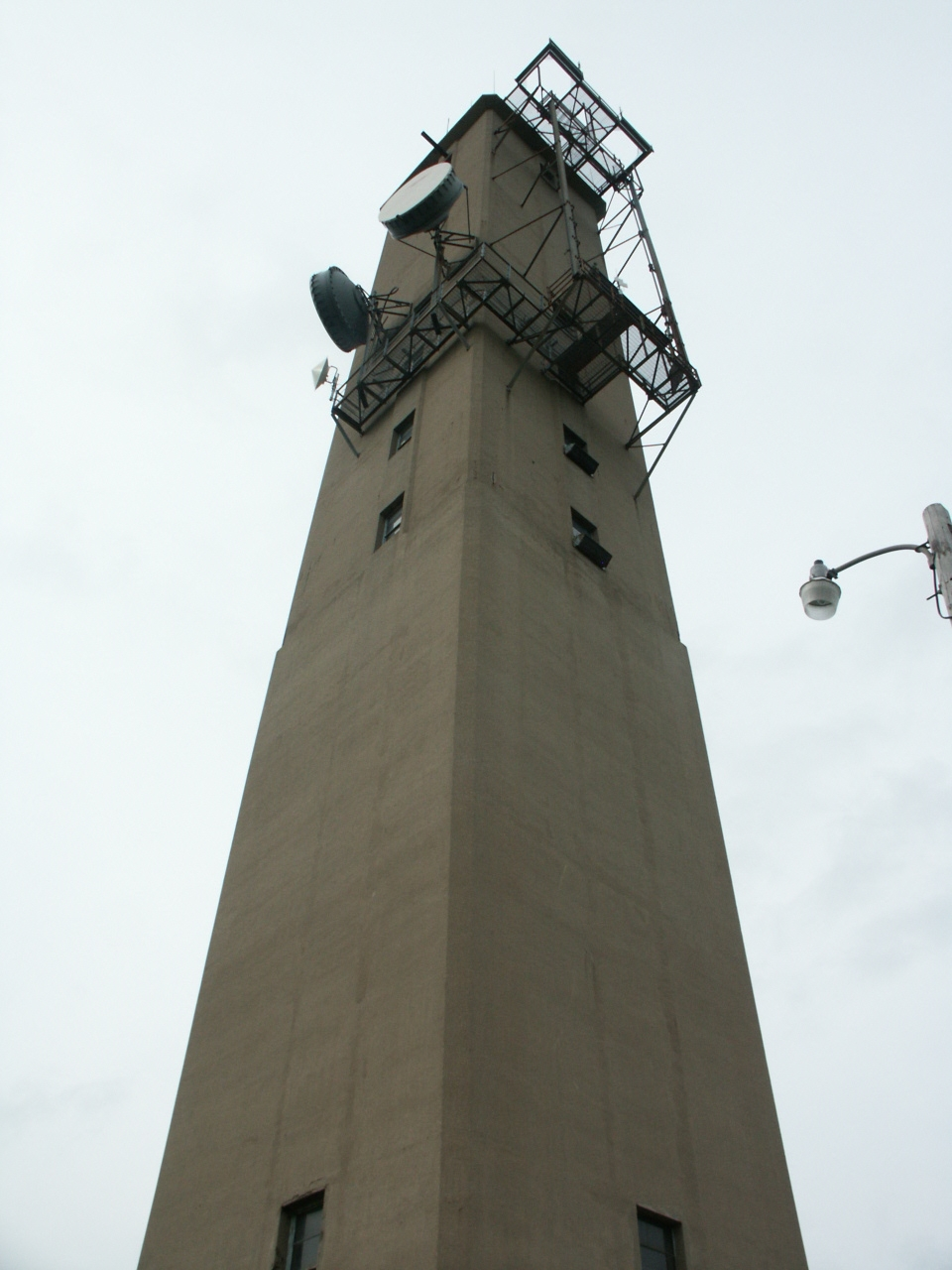
AT&T Long Lines relay tower in Indiana constructed with the slip-form method

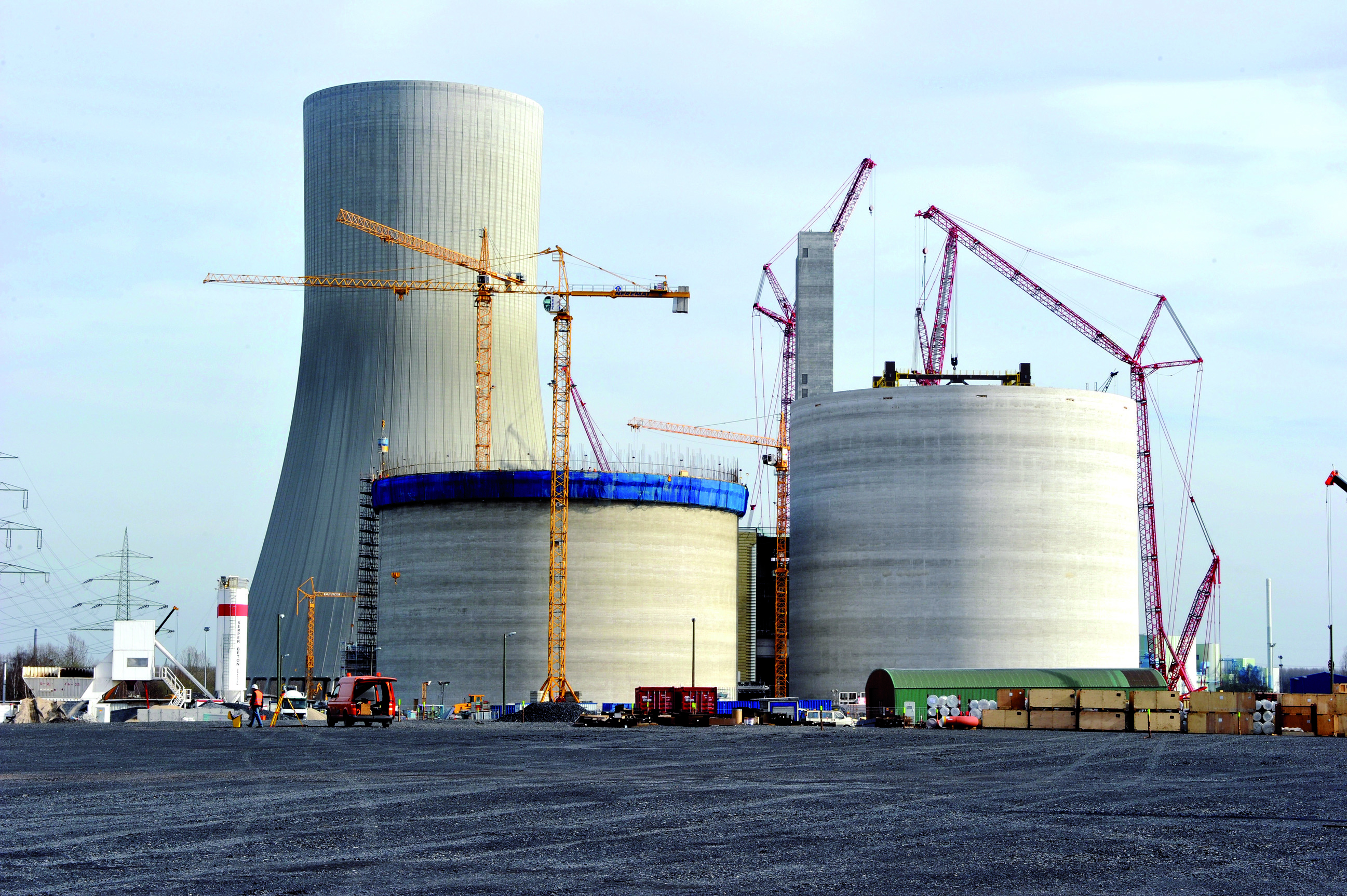
Two coal silos being constructed by slip forming

The former Landmark Hotel & Casino in Las Vegas was constructed in 1961 by MacDonald Engineering as a subcontractor, utilizing Macdonald’s concept of slip form concrete construction to build the 31 story steel-reinforced tower.

=== Residential and commercial building ===
The technique was introduced to residential and commercial buildings already in the 1950s in Sweden. The Swedish company Bygging developed in 1944 the first hydraulic jacks to lift the forms, which got patented. The first houses were built in Västertorp, Sweden, and Bygging became pioneers around the world with slip forming technique, from 1980 with the name Bygging-Uddemann.

Residential and commercial building also was introduced in the late 1960s in USA. One of Its first uses in high-rise buildings in the United States was on the shear wall supported apartment building at Turk & Eddy Streets in San Francisco, CA, in 1962, built by the San Francisco office of Macdonald Engineering. The first notable use of the method in a residential/retail business was the Skylon Tower in Niagara Falls, Ontario, which was completed in 1965. Another unusual structure was the tapered buttress structures for the Sheraton Waikiki Hotel in Honolulu, Hawaii, in 1969. Another shear wall supported structure was the Casa Del Mar Condominium on Key Biscayne, Miami, FL in 1970.

From the 1950s, the vertical technique was adapted to mining head frames, ventilation structures, below grade shaft lining, and coal train loading silos; theme and communication tower construction; high rise office building cores; shear wall supported apartment buildings; tapered stacks and hydro intake structures, etc. It is used for structures which would otherwise not be possible, such as the separate legs of the Troll A deep sea oil drilling platform which stands on the sea floor in water about 300 m (980 ft) deep, has an overall height of 472 m (1,549 ft) weighs 595,000 t (656,000 short tons), and has the distinction of being the tallest structure ever moved (towed) by mankind.

In addition to the typical silos and shear walls and cores in buildings, the system is used for lining underground shafts and surge tanks in hydroelectric generating facilities. The technique was utilized to build the Inco Superstack in Sudbury, Ontario, and the CN Tower in Toronto. In 2010, the technique was used to build the core of the supertall Shard London Bridge tower in London, England.

== Bibliography ==
- Nawy, Edward G. Concrete Construction Engineering Handbook. New York: CRC Press, 2008.
