= Sleipner A =

Offshore platform in the Norwegian sector of the North Sea

Sleipner A is a combined accommodations, production and processing offshore platform at the Sleipner East gas field in the Norwegian sector of the North Sea. It is a Condeep-type oil platform, built in Norway by the company Norwegian Contractors for Equinor.

It is known for its catastrophic failure during construction on 23 August 1991, due to a design flaw, that resulted from an error caused by unconservative concrete codes and inaccurate finite element analysis modelling of the tricell, which formed part of the ballasting/flotation system.

== Location ==
Sleipner A is located on the Sleipner East gas field on the North Sea. Also six satellite fields–Gungne, Loke, Alpha North, Sigyn, Volve and Volve South–are tied-back to Sleipner A. In addition to its own operations, the platform is used as a remote operation center for the Sleipner B wellhead platform. The Sleipner B is operated from the Sleipner A via an umbilical cable. In addition, the Sleipner T carbon dioxide treatment platform is linked physically to the Sleipner A platform by a bridge.

== Design ==
The platform is designed to accommodate roughly 160 people. The platform deck is 60 by 140 meters (197 by 459 ft) with a height of 210 meters (689 ft).

The original hull was a gravity base made up of support pilings and concrete ballast chambers from which three or four shafts rise and upon which the deck sits. Once fully ballasted, the hull was to sit on the sea floor. There were 24 chambers, of which four formed the 'legs' supporting the facility on top in the case of the Sleipner A oil rig.

The hull was redesigned after the accident and the Sleipner A Platform was successfully completed in June 1993.

== 1991 accident ==
=== Collapse ===
The original hull collapsed during the final construction because of a design flaw. It was towed into Gandsfjord where it was to be lowered in the water in a controlled ballasting operation at a rate of 1 meter per 20 minutes. This was necessary for the fitment of the deck platform to the hull. As the hull was lowered to the 65-meter (213 ft) mark, rumbling noises were heard followed by the sound of water pouring into the unit. A cell wall had failed and a serious crack had developed, and sea water poured in at a rate that was too great for the deballasting pumps to deal with. Within a few minutes the hull began sinking at a rate of 1 meter per minute. As the structure sank deeper into the 210-meter (690 ft) fjord, the buoyancy chambers imploded and the rubble struck the floor of the fjord, creating a Richter magnitude scale 3 earthquake.

Later analysis showed that the failure would occur at 62 meters (203 feet).

No one was injured during the accident.

=== Investigation ===
The post-accident investigation by SINTEF in Norway discovered that the root cause of the failure resulted from inaccurate NASTRAN calculations in the design of the structure. Stresses on the ballast chambers were underestimated by 47% and some concrete walls were designed too thin to resist foreseeable hydrostatic pressure when submerged. As the pressure increased, the walls failed and cracked, allowing sea water to enter the tank at an uncontrolled rate, eventually sinking the hull.

After the accident, the project leaders from Norwegian Contractors were brought before the Statoil board, and were expecting severe repercussions. But the director instead asked the famous question "Can you make a new one before schedule?" to which the contractors replied "Yes we can". The new hull was completed before schedule.

== Computer-Aided Catastrophes ==
Computer-Aided Catastrophes, or CAC for short, such as the Sleipner Incident presented in this article, provide extremely valuable lessons for practising engineers working with numerical simulation tools such as the finite element method. The reason for the poor finite element result that led to the Sleipner Incident have been studied in more detail in NAFEMS Benchmark Challenge Number 6.
