= Shore power =

Providing electrical power from shore to a ship

Shore power or shore supply is the provision of shoreside electrical power to a ship at berth allowing its engines to be shut down. While the term originates from watercraft, it has been applied to aircraft or land-based vehicles, which may plug into grid power when parked for idle reduction.

The source of land-based power is typically supplied by an electric utility, though it may also be provided by an external generator powered by diesel fuel or renewable energy sources such as wind or solar.

Shore power reduces fuel consumption that would otherwise be required to operate onboard generators while in port and eliminates associated air pollution. Some port cities have anti-idling regulations that require ships to connect to shore power where available. Its use may also facilitate maintenance of onboard engines and generators and reduce noise.

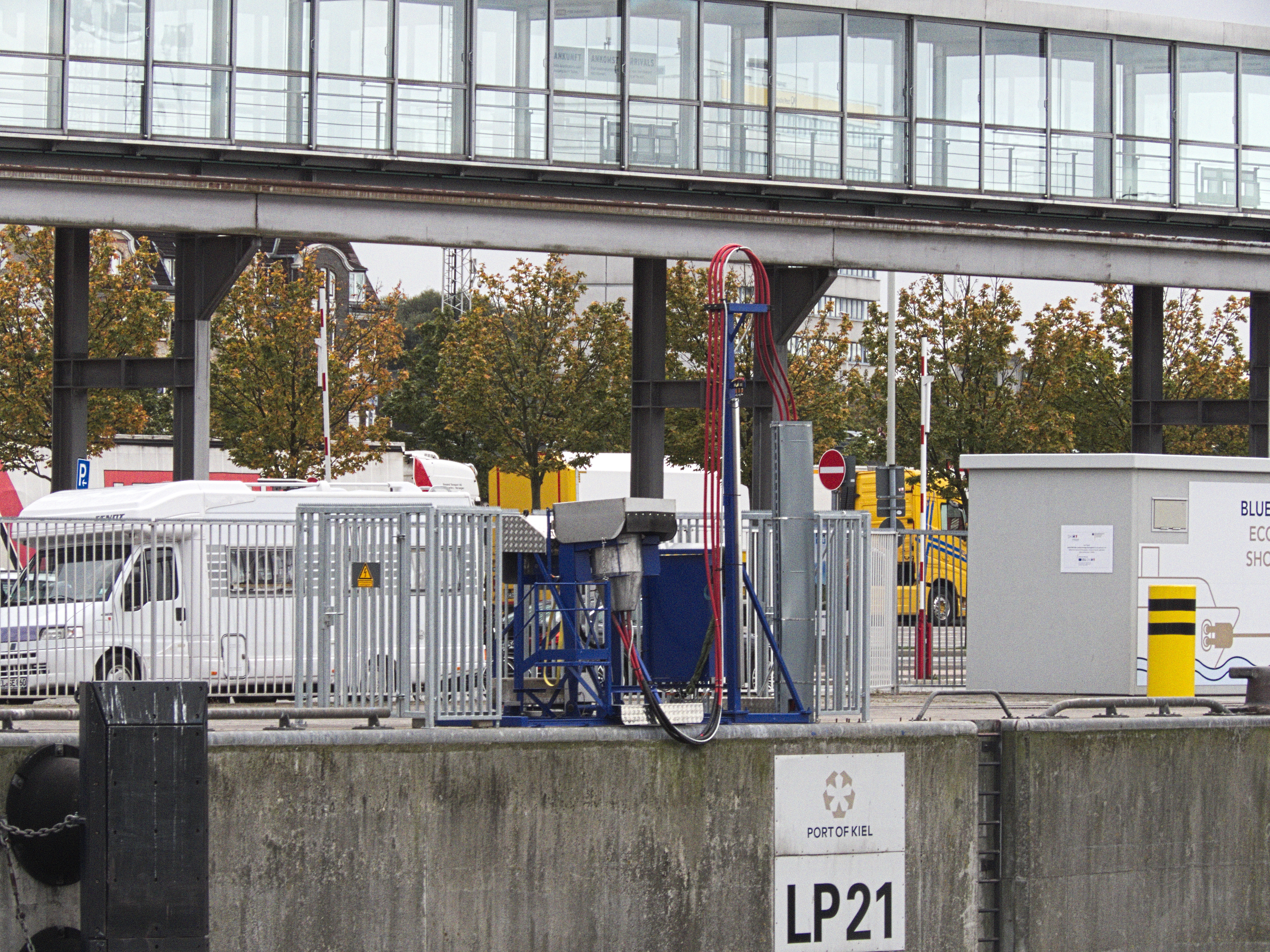
4.5 MW connection at the Port of Kiel in Germany

The amount of electrical power required can be substantial. For example, to supply visiting cruise ships, the port of Flåm in Norway installed a system capable of delivering 16 MVA to a single vessel. The port of San Diego is capable of supplying three ships simultaneously at comparable power levels and additionally operates a high-voltage shore connection system.

== Oceangoing ships ==
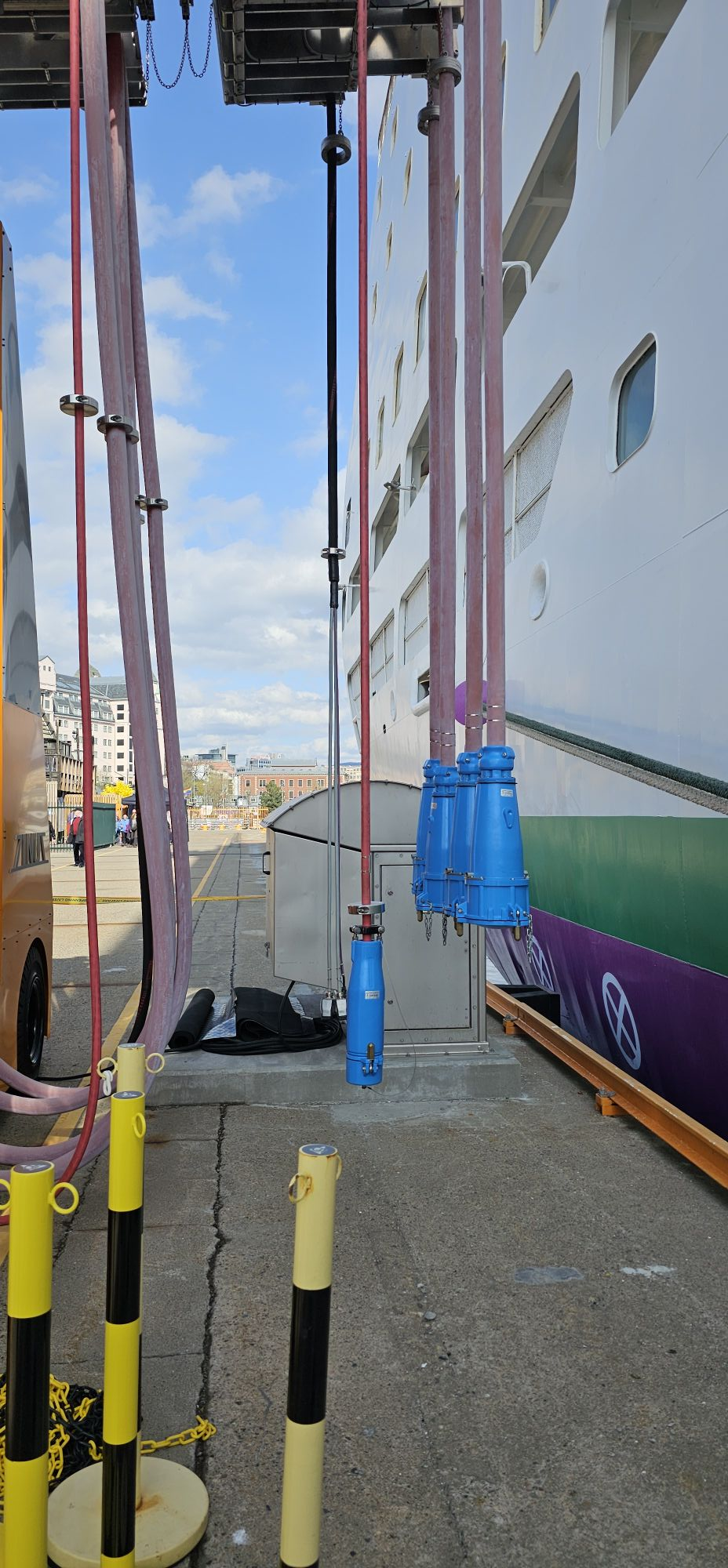
IEC ISO IEEE 80005-1 shorepower plugs ready to be attached to a ship in the Port of Oslo.

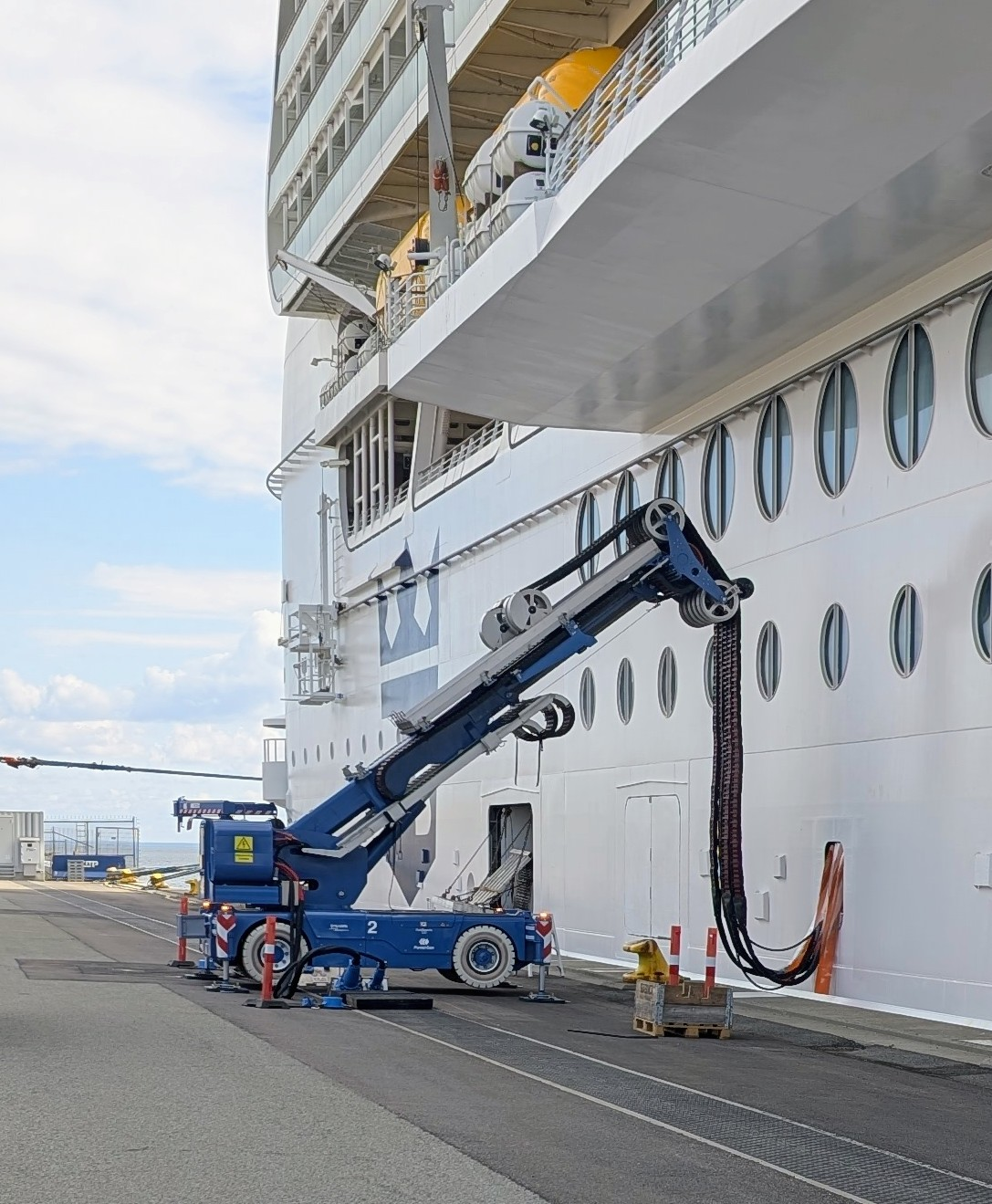
Royal Caribbean cruise ship Liberty of the Seas plugged in

Modern commercial vessels can connect to shore power while in port, allowing them to shut down auxiliary diesel engines used for cargo handling, pumping, ventilation, lighting, and other onboard systems. This reduces air pollutant and greenhouse gas emissions. Ferries and cruise ships commonly use shore power to supply onboard "hotel" loads, and specialized vessels, such as salmon feeder ships, may also connect to shore power while operating at aquaculture sites.

Larger shore power installations may include electrical equipment to convert grid voltage and frequency to match a vessel's onboard systems. Several ports have introduced programs to expand shore power infrastructure.

"Cold ironing" is a term originating in the shipping industry during the era of coal-fired steamships. When a vessel was moored in port, its boilers were no longer fed with coal and the iron engines gradually cooled, eventually going cold, giving rise to the term.

Under the European Union's Fit for 55 climate package, major ports in the European Union are required to provide shore power for certain vessel types by 2030. As of 2023, approximately 46% of cruise ships worldwide were capable of connecting to shore power while in port.

== Small watercraft ==
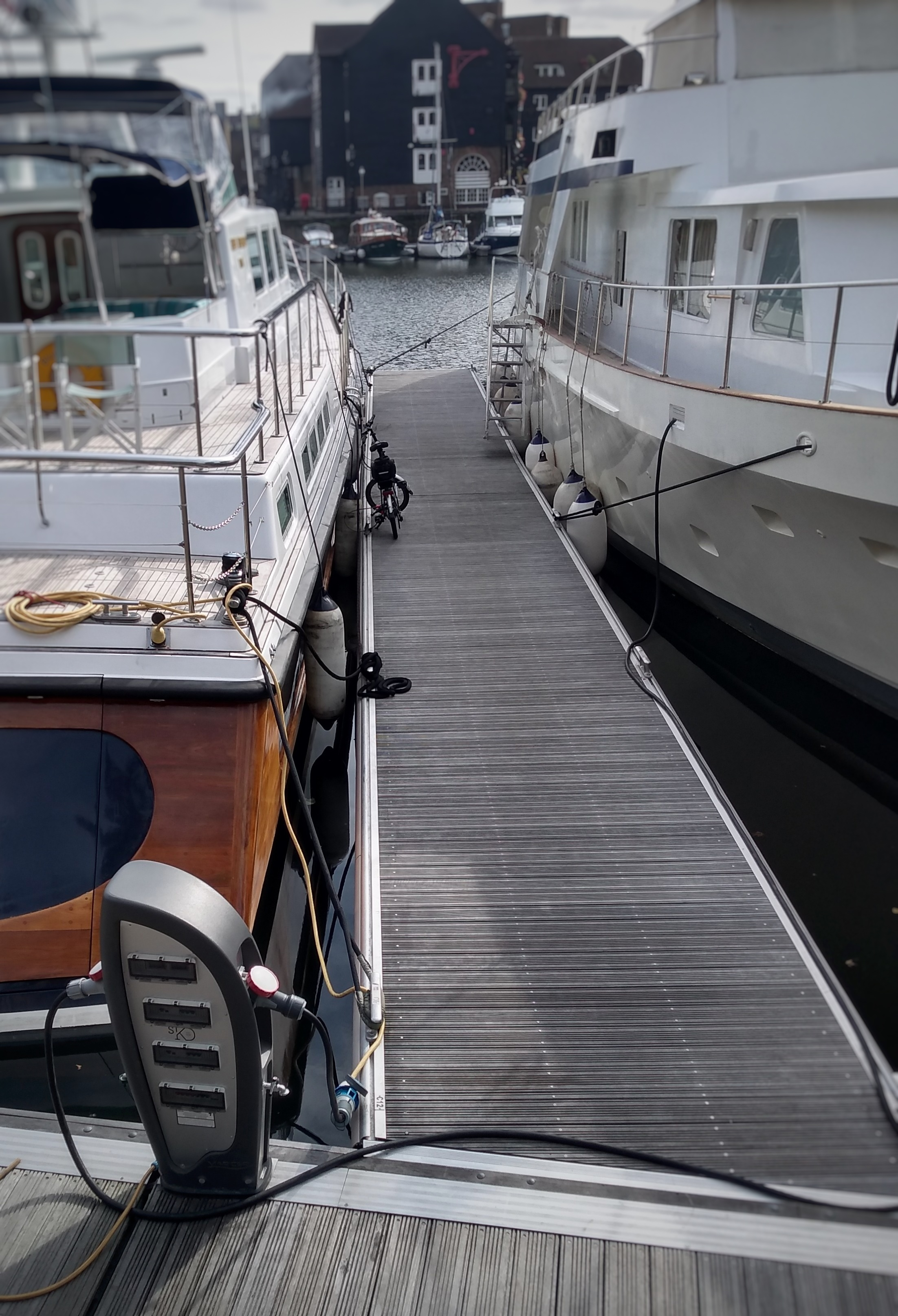
Small boats using 230V 16A IEC 60309 for shore power connections

On smaller vessels, onboard electrical systems are typically 12- or 24-volt DC systems fed by batteries recharged by the engine while underway, similar to an automobile. When berthed in a marina or harbor, power may available through a shore power connection.

This allows the vessel to recharge its batteries and operate appliances such as televisions, washing machines, cooking equipment, and air conditioning. Power is typically supplied from a dockside pedestal, which may be metered and require payment if electricity is not included in mooring fees. The vessel connects to the supply using an appropriate shore power cable.

== Trucks ==
In the trucking industry, shore power is commonly referred to as "truck stop electrification" (TSE). The United States Environmental Protection Agency estimates that heavy-duty trucks connecting to shore power instead of idling on diesel fuel can save up to $3,240 annually in fuel costs. As of 2009, 138 truck stops in the United States offered electrification services for an hourly fee, either through onboard systems (which supply power directly to the truck) or off-board systems (which provide external climate control units).

Auxiliary power units provide another alternative to both engine idling and shore power systems.

== Aircraft ==
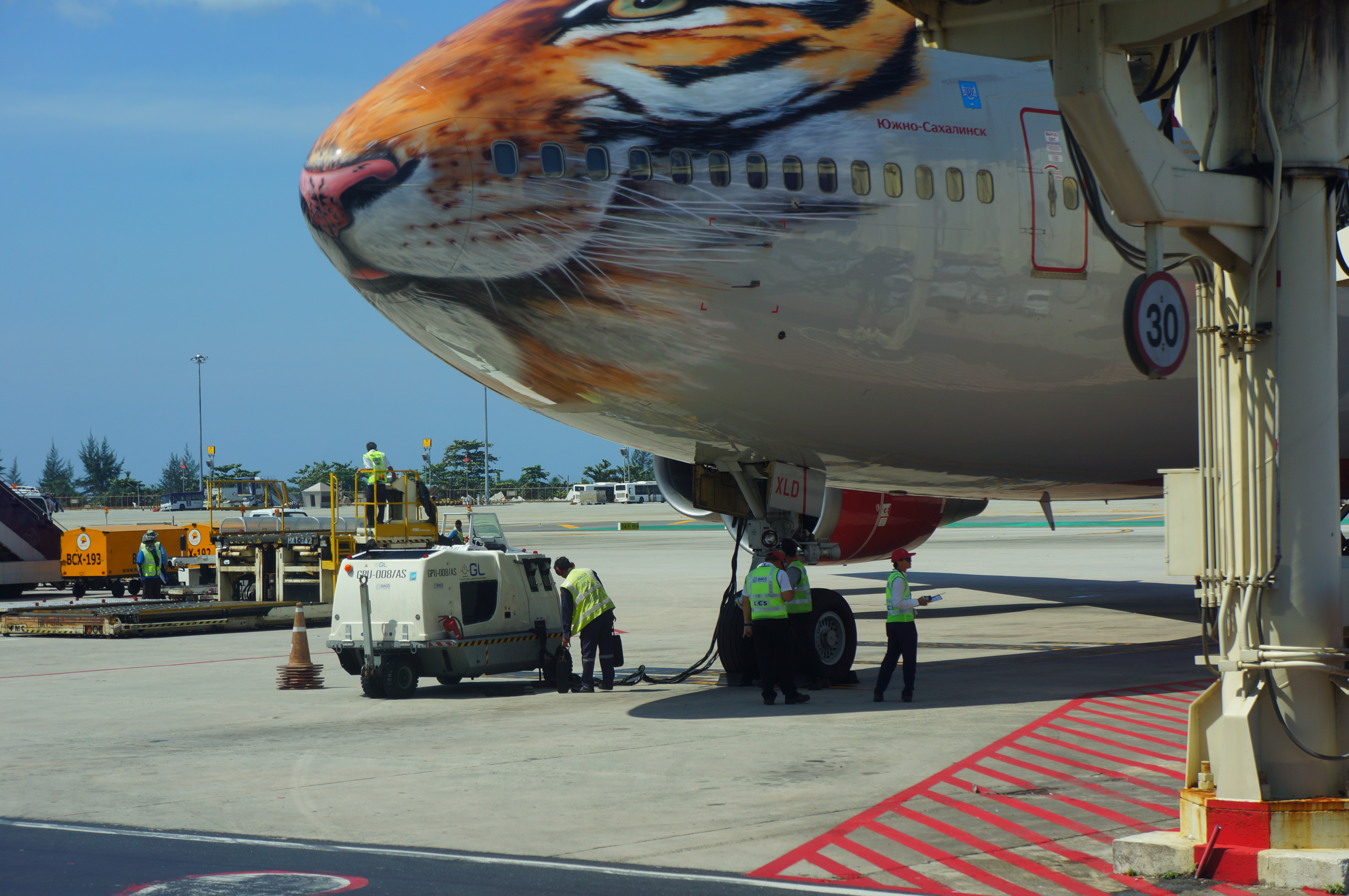
A Rossiya Airlines airplane connected to its 115V 400Hz AC ground power unit at Phuket International Airport.

Similar to shore power for ships, a ground power unit (GPU) may be used to supply electric power for an aircraft on the ground, to sustain interior lighting, ventilation and other requirements before starting of the main engines or the aircraft auxiliary power unit (APU). It is also used by aircraft with APUs if the airport authority does not permit the usage of APUs whilst parked, or if the carrier wishes to save on the use of jet fuel (which APUs use). This may be a self-contained engine-generator set, or it may convert commercial power to the voltage and frequency needed for the aircraft (for example 115 V or 230V / 400 Hz).

== Trains and buses ==
Shore power may be a grid connection for passenger trains laying over between runs. Similarly buses may be connected when not in use.

== Offshore platforms ==
Some offshore oil&gas platforms receive electricity from shore to reduce the onboard fuel consumption. 16 fields get power from the hydropower electricity sector in Norway, for example the Troll A and B gets 84 MW.

== See also ==
- IEC 60309 2P+E plugs (pretty common in Europe) for small boats providing 16, 32 or 63 A at 230 volts
- NEMA L5-30 plugs are most often used in N. America for small boats (120 volts at 30 A)
- IEC/ISO/IEEE 80005-1 - international standard for larger vessels requiring over 1MVA
