= Norwegian Contractors =

Norwegian Contractors AS was a concrete gravity base (GBS) structure supplier from 1974 to 1994. Aker Marine Contractors AS (AMC) was established in 1995 and is a continuance of the marine activities in Norwegian Contractors AS.

Norwegian Contractors AS have worked on following offshore platforms:

- Ecofisk tank
- Frigg 3 offshore platforms
- Statfjord A
- Statfjord B
- Statfjord C
- Gullfaks A
- Gullfaks B
- Oseberg A
- Gullfaks C (heaviest object ever moved by mankind)
- Draugen
- Heidrun
- Hibernia-Bohrplatform (1997)
- Nordhordland-Brücke (1994)
- Sleipner A (1993)
- Snorre
- Troll A platform (1995)

== See also ==
- Offshore concrete structure
