= High-voltage shore connection =

Type of electrical connection

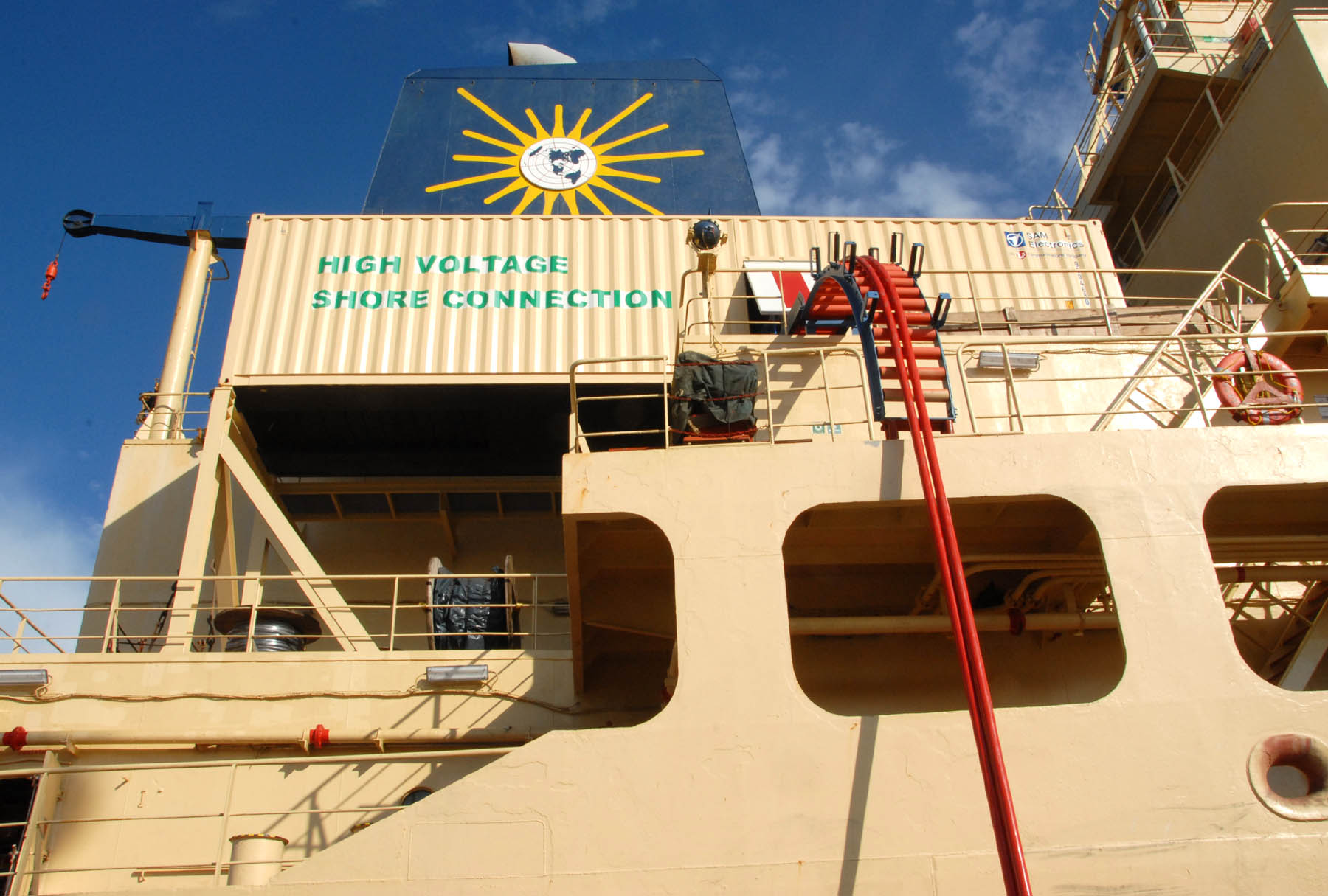
A ship connected to the Port of San Diego's high-voltage shore connection, shortly after the port installed the connection in 2014

A high-voltage shore connection (HVSC) is an electrical connection between a ship and an electric grid at a voltage level between 1 kV AC to 15 kV AC.

Using shore power allows the ship to shut off its engines and reduce fuel consumption and carbon emissions doing so at high voltage reduces the size and number of cables needed for a given amount of power compared to shore power systems that run at the normal voltage of the local grid.

The ship can use electric power for its consumption of energy. They are mostly used in the cruise ships which dock for longer time and hence save energy.

Power connections from ship to shore, whereby the power is generated on the ship and transmitted to land is realized with powerships.
