= Gravity-based structure =

Offshore support structure

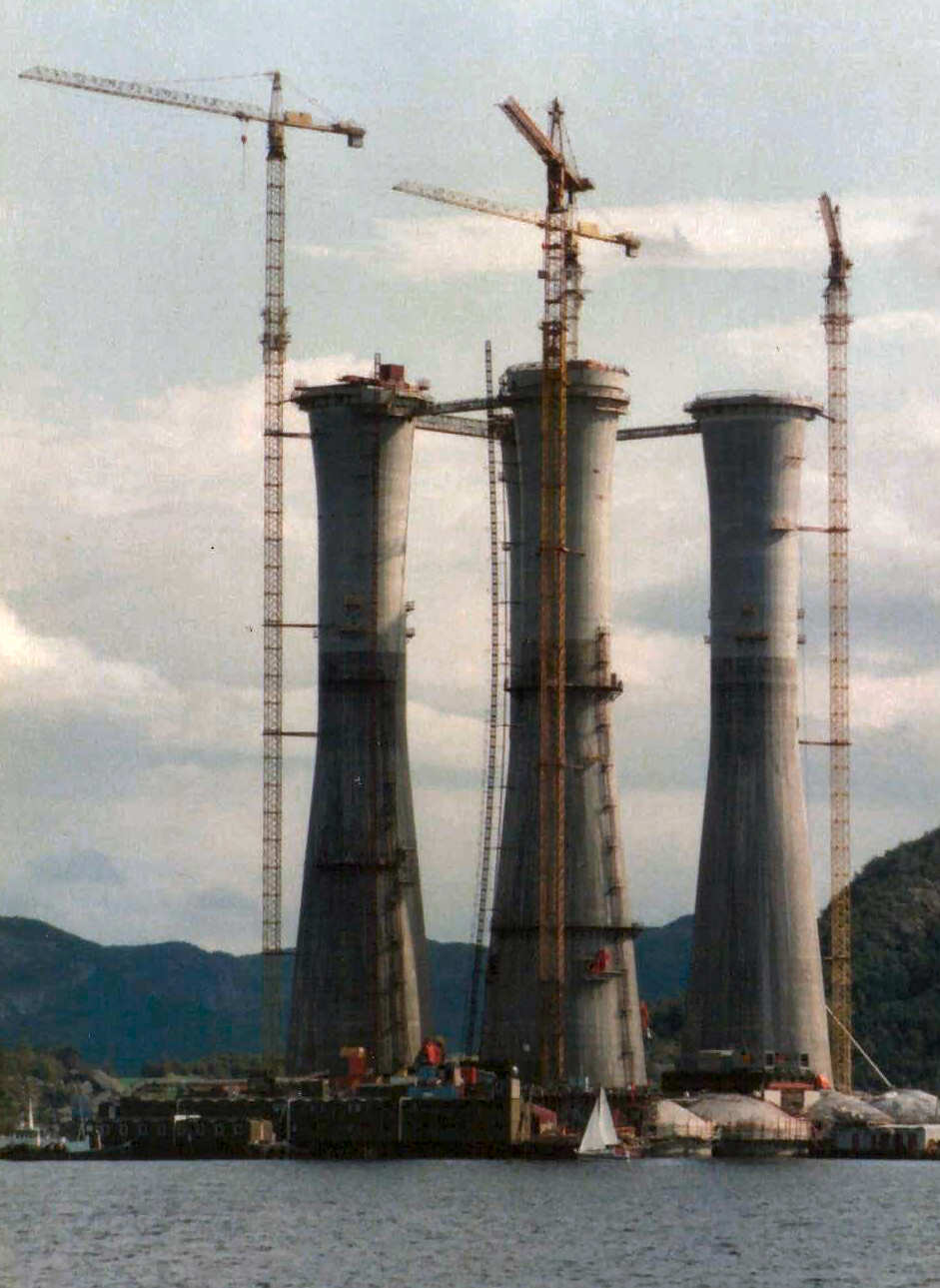
A Condeep type GBS under construction in Norway

A gravity-based structure (GBS) is a support structure held in place by gravity, most notably part of an offshore oil platform. These structures are often constructed in fjords due to their protected area and sufficient depth.

== Offshore oil platforms ==
Prior to deployment, a study of the seabed must be done to ensure it can withstand the vertical load from the structure. It is then constructed with steel reinforced concrete into tanks or cells, some of which are used to control the buoyancy. When construction is complete, the structure is towed to its intended location.

Notable GBSs include the 1997 Hibernia Gravity Base Structure off Newfoundland. Around 2020 GBSes became the fashion for Novatek's exploitation of the petroleum resources in the Gulf of Ob.

== Wind turbines ==
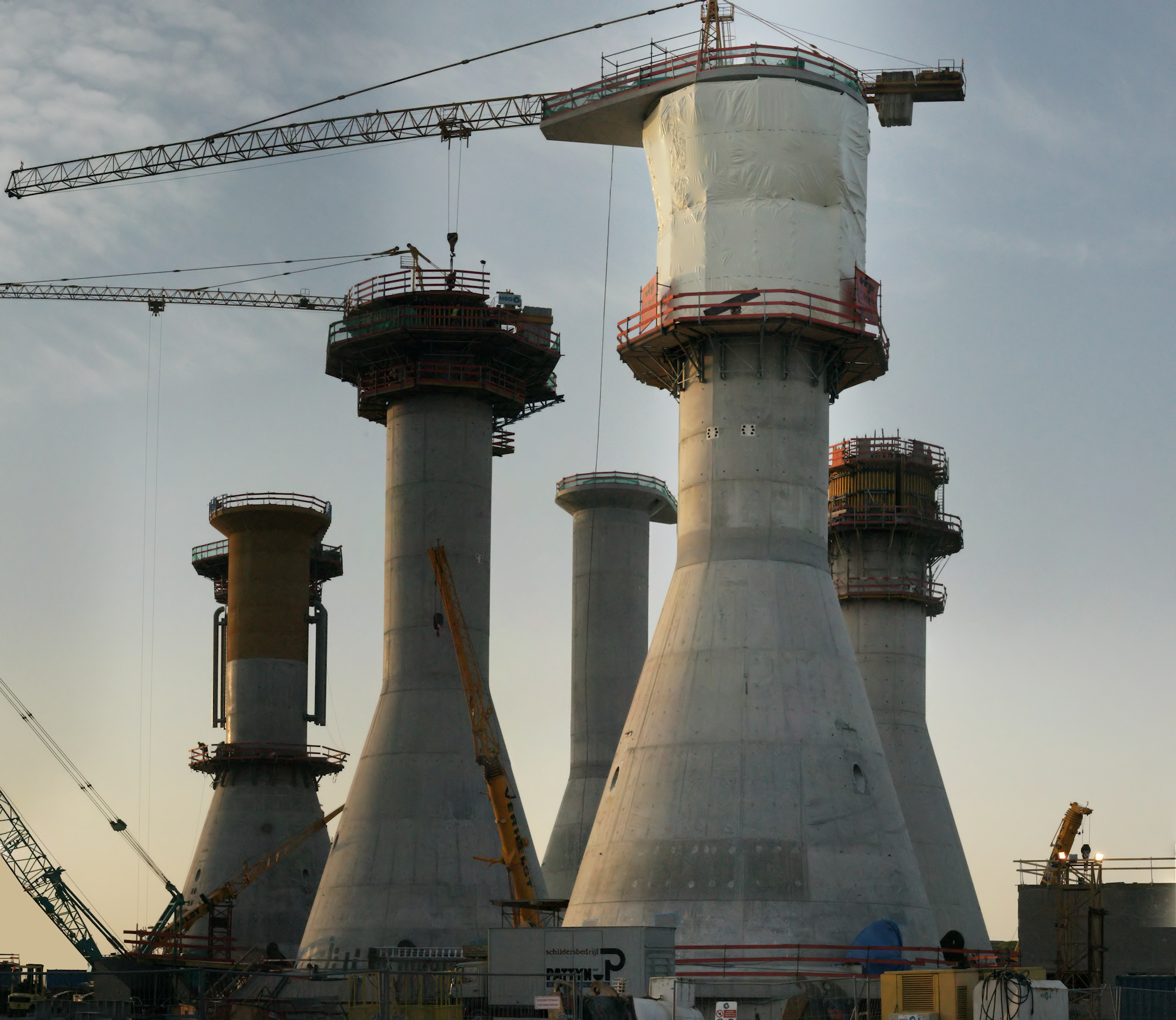
Construction of the bases of new wind turbine generators for the Thornton Bank offshore wind farm, in Oostende, Belgium

Early deployments of offshore wind power turbines used these structures. As of 2010, 14 of the world's offshore wind farms had some of their turbines supported by gravity-based structures. The deepest registered offshore wind farm with gravity-based structures is the Blyth Offshore Wind Farm, UK, with a depth of approx. 40 m.

== See also ==
- Offshore concrete structure
- List of tallest oil platforms
- Troll A platform
- Gullfaks C
- Hibernia (oil field)
