= Condeep =

Make of gravity based oil platform structure

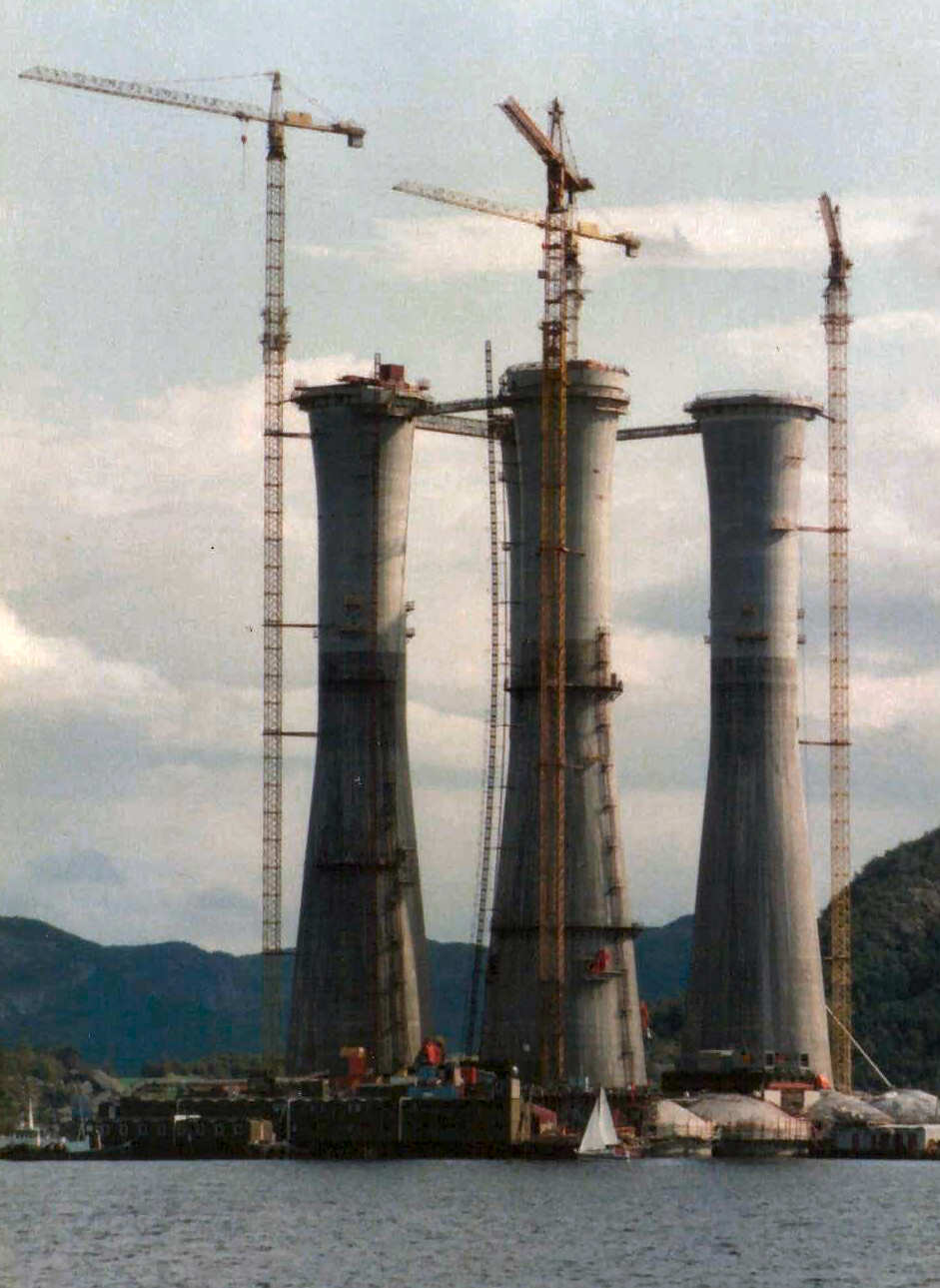
A Condeep under construction in Norway

Condeep is a make of gravity-based structure for oil platforms invented and patented by engineer Olav Mo in 1972, which were fabricated by Norwegian Contractors in Stavanger, Norway. Condeep is an abbreviation for concrete deep water structure. A Condeep usually consists of a base of concrete oil storage tanks from which one, three or four concrete shafts rise. The Condeep base always rests on the sea floor, and the shafts rise to about 30 meters above the sea level. The platform deck itself is not a part of the construction.

The Condeep is used for a series of production platforms introduced for crude oil and natural gas production in the North Sea and Norwegian continental shelf.

Following the success of the concrete oil storage tank on the Ekofisk field, Norwegian Contractors introduced the Condeep production platform concept in 1973.

This gravity-based structure for a platform was unique in that it was built from reinforced concrete instead of steel, which was the norm up to that point. This platform type was designed for the heavy weather conditions and the great water depths often found in the North Sea.

Condeep has the advantage that it allows for storage of oil at sea in its own construction. It further allows equipment installation in the hollow legs well protected from the sea. In contrast, one of the challenges with steel platforms is that they only allow for limited weight on the deck compared with a Condeep where the weight allowance for production equipment and living quarters is seldom a problem.

== Troll A ==
The Troll A platform is the tallest Condeep to date. It was built over a period of four years, using a workforce of 2,000, and deployed in 1995 to produce gas from the enormous Troll oil field. With a total height of 472 metres (1,549 ft), Troll A was the tallest object that has ever been moved to another position, relative to the surface of the Earth. Many sources incorrectly state that it was also the largest structure of any kind to be moved but the Gullfaks C was in fact heavier. The total weight of the Troll A Condeep when launching was 1.2 million tons. 245,000 m³ of concrete and 100,000 tons of steel for reinforcement were used. The amount of steel corresponds to 15 Eiffel towers. The platform is placed at a depth of 300 meters. For stability, it is dug 35 meters into the sea floor.

== Gullfaks C ==
Gullfaks C rests 217 metres (712 ft) below the sea surface and has a total height of 380 metres (1,250 ft). Gullfaks C was the heaviest object that has ever been moved to another position, relative to the surface of the Earth with a total displacement between 1.4 and 1.5 million tons.

== Condeep platforms ==
Structure	Depth	Operator	Year
Beryl A Condeep	120 m	Mobil	1975
Brent B Condeep	140 m	Shell	1975
Brent D Condeep	140 m	Shell	1976
Frigg TCP2 Condeep	104 m	Elf	1977
Statfjord A Condeep	146 m	Mobil	1977
Statfjord B Condeep	146 m	Mobil	1981
Statfjord C Condeep	146 m	Mobil	1984
Gullfaks A Condeep	135 m	Statoil	1986
Gullfaks B Condeep	142 m	Statoil	1987
Oseberg A Condeep	109 m	Norsk Hydro	1988
Gullfaks C Condeep	216 m	Statoil	1989
Draugen Condeep	251 m	Shell	1993
Sleipner A Condeep	82 m	Statoil	1993*
Troll Condeep	303 m	Norske Shell	1995

- The original concrete structure of Sleipner A sank during trials in the Gandsfjord on August 23, 1991. A new structure was built, and deployed in 1993.

== Sources ==
- Fagerberg, Jan; Mowery, David C.; Verspagen, Bart (2009). Innovation, Path Dependency, and Policy: The Norwegian Case. Oxford University Press US. ISBN 978-0-19-955155-2.
- Nawy, Edward G. (2008). Concrete construction engineering handbook. CRC Press. ISBN 978-0-8493-7492-0.
- Mehta, Povindar K. (1990). Concrete in the marine environment. Taylor & Francis. ISBN 978-1-85166-622-5.
- Gerwick, Ben C. (2007). Construction of marine and offshore structures. CRC Press. ISBN 978-0-8493-3052-0.
- Arentsen, Maarten J.; Künneke, Rolf W. (2003). National reforms in European gas. Gulf Professional Publishing. ISBN 978-0-08-043687-6.
