= List of tallest oil platforms =

This is a list of the tallest oil platforms over 300 m (984 ft) in height. It includes compliant towers, condeep gravity-based structures, and fixed platforms, but not other types of oil platform, which can be much taller (see Oil platform#Deepest platforms by type). The current highest oil platform among these types is the Petronius platform operated by Chevron Corporation and Marathon Oil in the Gulf of Mexico, 210 km southeast of New Orleans, United States.

Name	Pinnacle height (metres / feet)		Year	Type	Built in	Waterbody	Built by(Jacket/Main structure)	Owner/Operator	Cost	Water Depth	Jacket Weight	Remarks
Petronius Compliant Tower	640	2,100	2000	Compliant tower	United States	Gulf of Mexico	Gulf Island Fabrication	Chevron (originally Texaco) and Marathon Oil	$500 million	1754	43,000	Tallest freestanding structure in the world 2000–2006 Jacket height 509 m (1,671 ft).
Baldpate Compliant Tower	581.5	1,908	1998	Compliant tower	United States	Gulf of Mexico	McDermott Engineering & Aker Gulf Marine	Hess Corporation (originally Amerada Hess)	$300 million	1647	57,269	Tallest freestanding structure in the world 1998–2000.
Bullwinkle Platform	529	1,736	1989	Truss tower	United States	Gulf of Mexico	Gulf Marine Fabricators	Shell	$500 million	1348 or 1353	54,427 or 49,375	Tallest fixed steel structure in the world. No structural changes required if the structure was built on land. Jacket height 416 m (1,365 ft)
Benguela-Belize Lobito-Tomboco Platform	512	1,680	2008	Compliant tower	United States	Congo Basin	Gulf Marine Fabricators (now owned by Gulf Island) & Kiewit Offshore Services	Chevron		1280	43,500	
Pompano Platform	477	1,565	1994	Truss tower	United States	Gulf of Mexico	McDermott Engineering	Stone Energy (originally BP)		1289	39,890	
Tombua Landana platform	474	1,554	2009	Compliant tower	United States	Congo Basin	Gulf Marine Fabricators & Daewoo	Chevron		1200	56,400	
Troll A platform	472	1,549	1996	Condeep	Norway	North Sea	Norwegian Contractors	Equinor (originally Statoil)	$650 million	994	683,600	Tallest object ever moved
Coelacanth Platform	400	1,312	2016	Truss tower	United States	Gulf of Mexico	Gulf Marine Fabricators	Walter Oil & Gas Corporation (50.5%)		1186	30,000	Jacket height 366 m (1,200 ft)
Lena Platform	396	1,300	1983	Compliant tower, Guyed	United States	Gulf of Mexico	Brown & Root	Exxon		1014	24,000 or 27,000	Jacket height 328.5 m (1,078 ft)
Cognac Platform	385.5	1,265	1977	Truss tower	United States	Gulf of Mexico	McDermott Engineering	Shell	$100 or $265 million	1027	59,000	
Gullfaks C	380	1,250	1995	Condeep	Norway	North Sea	Norwegian Contractors	Equinor (originally Statoil)		709	500,000	Heaviest object ever moved, weight of structure plus ballast resulted in a total displacement of 1.4 to 1.5 million tons
Harmony Platform	366+	1,200+	1992	Truss tower	South Korea	California	Hyundai Heavy Industries	Exxon		1198	42,900	Tallest steel jacket built outside of the United States. Height is only to water level, likely to be taller than the Cognac Platform and Coelacanth Platform
Hondo Platform	354.5	1,163	1976	Truss tower	United States	California	Kaiser Steel Corporation	Exxon		842	12,200	
Virgo Platform	344+	1,130+	1999	Truss tower	United States	Gulf of Mexico		W&T Offshore Inc (64%)		1130	24,000	Height is only to water level, likely to be taller than the Cognac Platform
Amberjack Platform	314+	1,100+	1991	Truss tower	United States	Gulf of Mexico		Stone Energy		1100 or 1030		Height is only to water level, likely to be taller than the Cognac Platform.
Heritage Platform	326+	1,075+	1992	Truss tower	South Korea	California	Hyundai Heavy Industries	Exxon		1075	32,420	Height is only to water level, likely to be taller than the Cognac Platform.
Cerveza Platform	327	1,073	1981	Truss tower	United States	Gulf of Mexico	McDermott Engineering	Unocal Corporation	$90 million	935	26,000	Jacket Height 952 ft
Cerveza Light Platform	327	1,073	1981	Truss tower	United States	Gulf of Mexico	McDermott Engineering	Unocal Corporation	$60 million	925	14,991	
Draugen platform	285.1	935	1993	Condeep	Norway	North Sea	Norwegian Contractors	Equinor (originally Statoil)		825		Height is only to the concrete base, likely to be similar in height to Gullfaks C. Displacement during tow; 518,000
Statfjord B Platform	271	889	1982	Condeep	Norway	North Sea	Norwegian Contractors	Equinor (originally Statoil)				
Statfjord A Platform	270	886	1979	Condeep	Norway	North Sea	Norwegian Contractors	Equinor (originally Statoil)				
