= SSCV Thialf =

Semi-submersible crane vessel

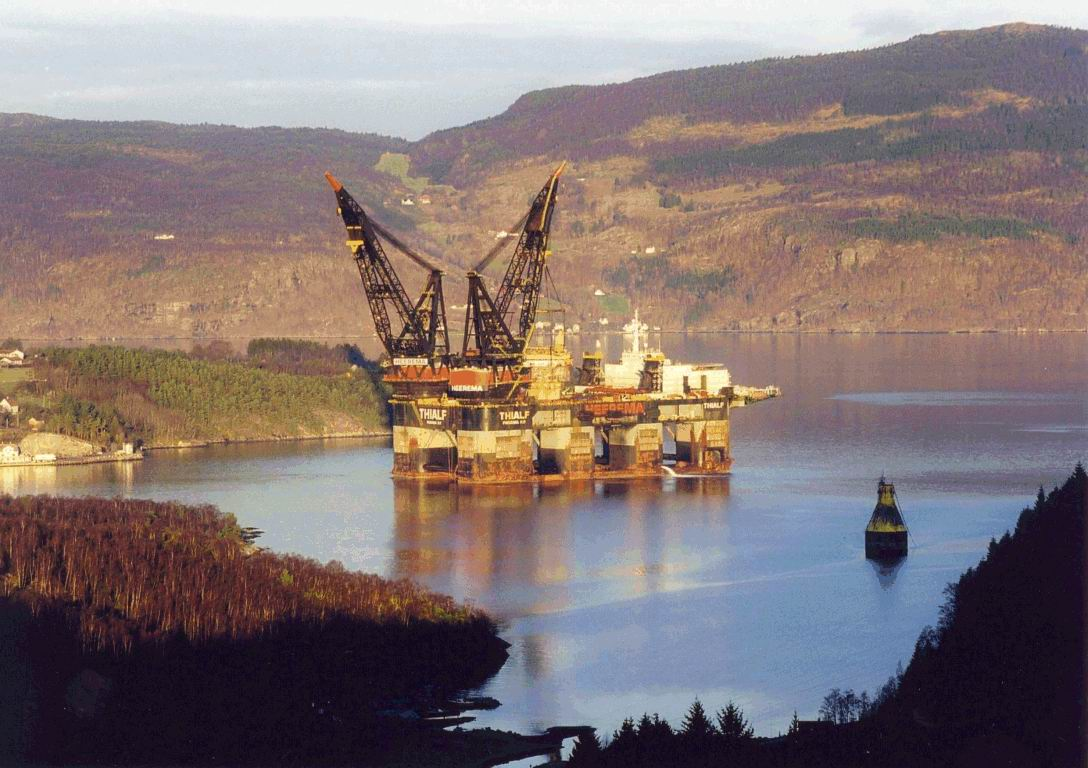
- SSCV Thialf in a Norwegian fjord

History
- Name: SSCV Thialf
- Namesake: Thialfi (Norse servant of Thor)
- Operator: Heerema Marine Contractors
- Builder: Mitsui Engineering & Shipbuilding
- Identification: IMO number: 8757740; MMSI Number: 353979000; Callsign: 3EAA4
- Status: In service

General characteristics
- Class & type: Semi-submersible crane vessel
- Tonnage: 136,709 GT; 41,012 NT
- Displacement: 198,750 t max
- Length: 201.6 m (661 ft 5 in)
- Beam: 88.4 m (290 ft 0 in)
- Height: 144.0 m (472 ft 5 in) crane
- Draft: 31.6 m (103 ft 8 in) max
- Depth: 49.5 m (162 ft 5 in)
- Propulsion: 6 × 5,500 kW retractable azimuthing thrusters
- Complement: 736 berths

SSCV Thialf is a semi-submersible crane vessel operated by the Netherlands-based Heerema Marine Contractors; it was the largest crane vessel in the world until the SSCV Sleipnir became the largest in 2019.

== History ==
The ship was constructed in 1985 as DB-102 for McDermott International by Mitsui Engineering & Shipbuilding Co., Ltd. In 1997, it was taken over by Heerema Marine Contractors after discontinuation of their joint venture with McDermott, HeereMac, and renamed Thialf.

== Layout ==
The Thialf has two cranes with a combined maximum lifting capacity of 14,200 metric tons (14,000 long tons; 15,700 short tons).

It is equipped with a class III dynamic positioning system. Propulsion and position keeping is by six 5,500-kW retractable azimuthing thrusters. For shallow waters, there are 12 Flipper Delta anchors at 22.5 t, with 2,500 meters (8,200 ft), 80 mm mooring wire.

The hull consists of two pontoons with four columns each. Transit draft is about 12 meters (39 ft). For lifting operations, it is normally ballasted down to 26.6 m (87 ft 3 in). This way the pontoons (with a draft of 13.6 m, 44 ft 7 in) are well submerged to reduce the effect of waves and swell.

It is able to accommodate 736 people.

Its lightship weight is 72,484 t.

== Noteworthy projects ==
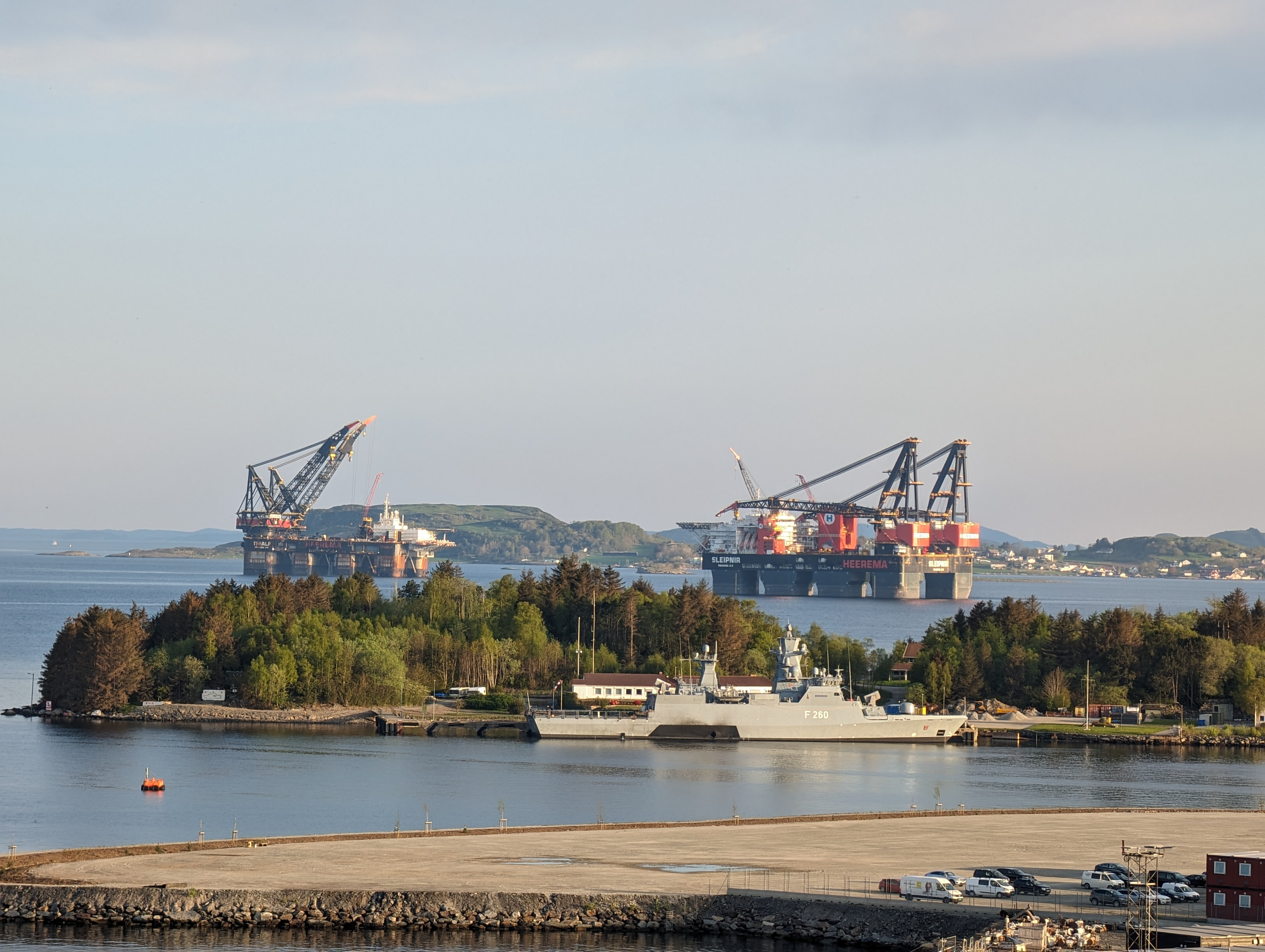
Thialf and Sleipnir at Stavanger in May 2024. The German corvette Braunschweig in the foreground.

- Installing the pylon of the Erasmus Bridge in 1995.
- Decommissioning of the Brent Spar in 1998.
- In 2000, it set a world record of 11,883 t by lifting Shell's Shearwater topsides, beaten by Saipem 7000 in 2004 with the Sabratha deck lifting of 12,150 t.
- In 2004, it installed the topsides on BP's Holstein, at the time the world's largest spar. The lift was a record for the Gulf of Mexico: 7,810 t. The current record for Gulf of Mexico is now held by the Saipem 7000 with the 9,521 t of PEMEX PB-KU-A2 deck installed in March 2007.
- In 2005, it installed the heaviest single piece foundation piles: 2.74 meters diameter × 190 meters long, weighing 818 t each for Chevron's Benguela Belize compliant tower.
- In 2009, the ship became involved in the Alpha Ventus project, the first German offshore windfarm.
- 2017-2018: Thialf was involved in the installation of the platform sections of the Johan Sverdrup Complex, part of the development of the Johan Sverdrup oil field.
- NOTE: 1998 there was filmed a part of TV film "Operation Noah"
