= Fixed platform =

Type of offshore platform used for the extraction of petroleum or gas

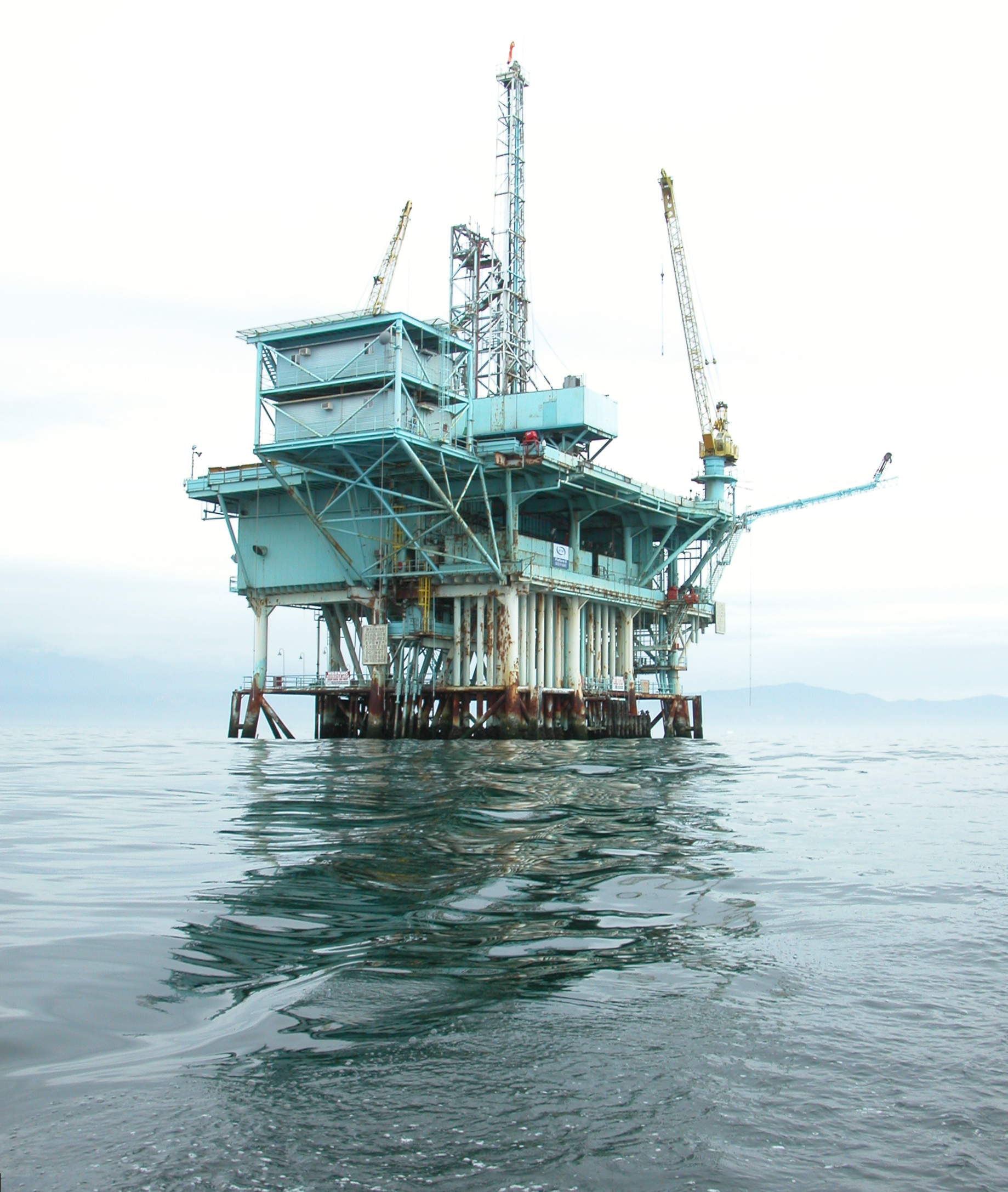
Unocal Platform B, a fixed platform constructed in 1968 in the Santa Barbara Channel, California. Water depth is 190 feet (58 m).

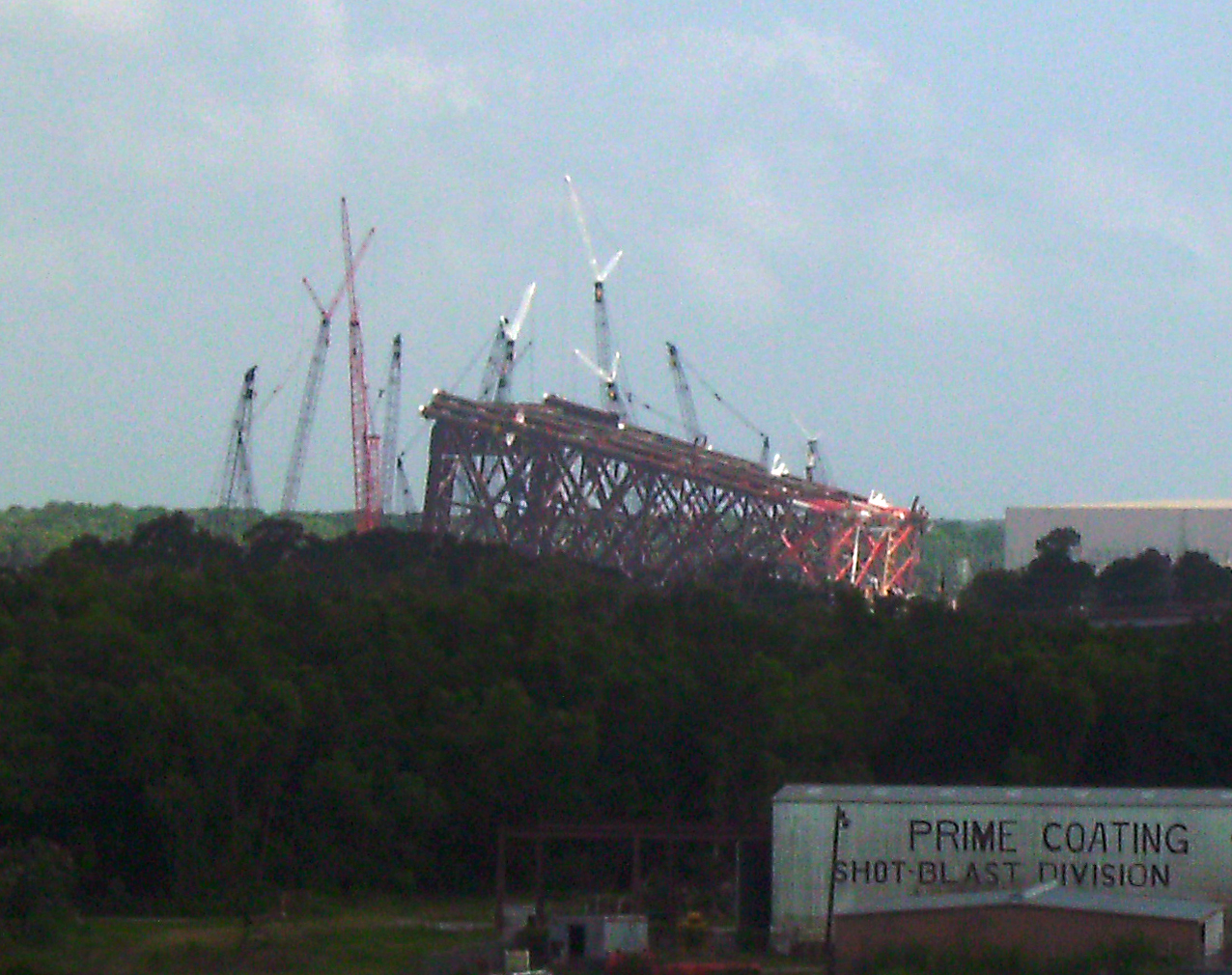
A fixed platform base under construction on a Louisiana river

A fixed platform is a type of offshore platform used for the extraction of petroleum or gas. These platforms are built on concrete and/or steel legs directly planted onto the seabed, supporting a deck with space for drilling rigs, production facilities and crew quarters. Such platforms are, by virtue of their immobility, designed for very long-term use. Various types of structure are used, steel jacket, concrete caisson, floating steel and even floating concrete. Steel jackets are vertical sections made of tubular steel members, and are usually piled into the seabed. Concrete caisson structures, pioneered by the Condeep concept, often have in-built oil storage in tanks below the sea surface and these tanks were often used as a flotation capability, allowing them to be built close to shore (Norwegian fjords and Scottish firths are popular because they are sheltered and deep enough) and then floated to their final position where they are sunk to the seabed. Fixed platforms are economically feasible for installation in water depths up to about 500 feet (150 m); for deeper depths a floating production system, or a subsea pipeline to land or to shallower water depths for processing, would usually be considered.

== See also ==
- List of tallest oil platforms
- List of tallest freestanding steel structures
- Bullwinkle Platform
- Pompano Platform
- Offshore geotechnical engineering
- Protocol for the Suppression of Unlawful Acts against the Safety of Fixed Platforms Located on the Continental Shelf
