= Baldpate (oil platform) =

Offshore compliant tower oil platform near the coast of Louisiana

Coordinates: 27°42′N 93°10′W

Baldpate is a 579.7 metres (1,902 ft) offshore compliant tower oil platform near the coast of Louisiana, owned and operated by Hess Corporation. It was the first freestanding compliant tower to be built following the Lena platform, which was a guyed compliant tower. It is the second tallest structure built in water after the Petronius (oil platform). The Baldpate Platform was designed and built by Hudson Engineering (now J. Ray McDermott Engineering) in Houston, Texas, and installed by Heerema Marine Contractors.

Compliant towers are designed to be more flexible than traditional fixed truss towers, such as the Bullwinkle (oil platform). Baldpate in particular is designed to move up to 10 feet laterally during severe storm conditions.

Aker Gulf Marine fabricated the compliant tower section jacket section, weighing 28,900 tons, far below the original estimate of 50,000 tons. The platform was built in multiple sections, which were assembled together later when the structure arrived at its final location. The lower 107 m (351 ft) tall base section weighs 8,700 tons. This section has a wider base, 140 feet square, that reduces to 90 feet square at its top. The main legs of the structure have a diameter of 12 feet at their widest with a steel thickness of 3.5 inches. At the corners of each side, the structure is supported by steel piles which reach a depth of 430 feet. The upper 402 m (1320 ft) tall tower section weighs 20,200 tons. This section has a length and width of 90 feet across, which remains constant from the bottom to the top of the frame. The main legs in this section have a diameter of 10.67 feet with a steel thickness of 3.3 inches. The total combined height of Baldpate's jacket/truss tower section is 1,671 feet, 1,647 feet of which is underwater. The topside weighs an additional 9,800 tons, giving the structure a total weight of 38,700 tons.

== See also ==
- List of tallest oil platforms
- List of tallest freestanding steel structures
- Offshore oil and gas in the US Gulf of Mexico
