= PRIO =

PRIO may stand for:

== Organizations and locations ==
- Peace Research Institute Oslo, is a private research institution in peace and conflict studies, based in Oslo, Norway.
- PRIO S.A., formerly PetroRio S.A. is a Brazilian publicly traded company focused on oil and gas production.
