= Bullwinkle (oil platform) =

Oil platform in the Gulf of Mexico

Coordinates: 27°53′01″N 90°54′04″W

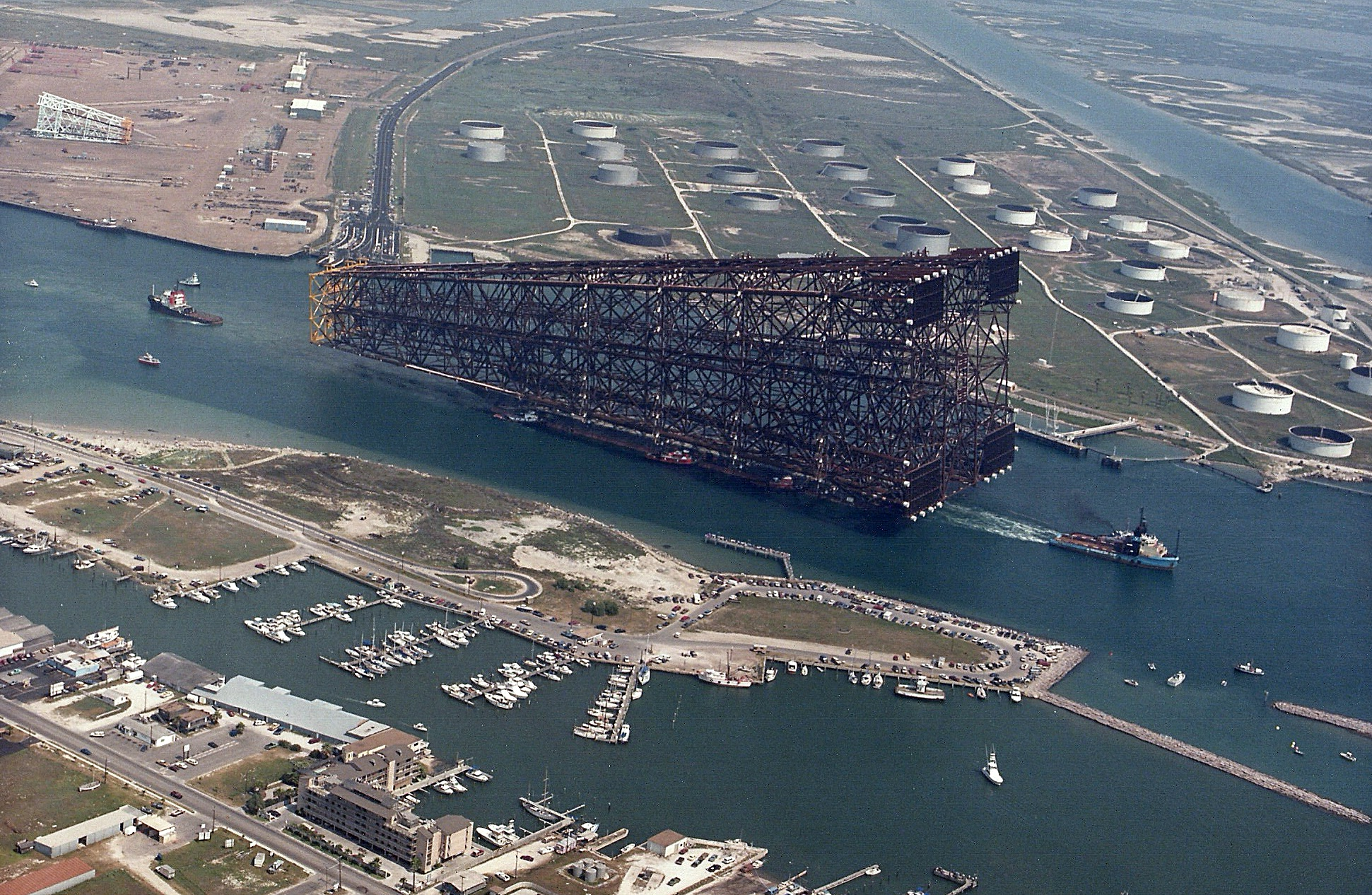
Platform being towed out to sea

Bullwinkle is a 1,736 feet (529 m) tall, pile-supported fixed steel oil platform in the Gulf of Mexico. Installed in 1988, the total weight of the platform is 77,000 tons, of which the steel jacket comprises 49,375 tons. At the time of its construction it was the third tallest freestanding structure ever built – shorter than only the CN Tower and the Ostankino Tower – and the tallest in the United States, being 6 ft (1.8 m) taller than the pinnacle of the Sears Tower. Of the total height, 1,352 feet (412 m) are below the waterline. It is located in Green Canyon Block 65, approximately 160 miles (260 km) southwest of New Orleans. Bullwinkle currently is operated by Talos Energy, LLC. The total field development construction cost was US$500,000,000 according to some sources.

The jacket, i.e. the mainly submerged part of the platform, was built by Gulf Marine Fabricators in 1985–1988 at the North Yard location in Ingleside, Texas, at the intersection of the Corpus Christi Ship Channel and the Intracoastal Waterway in Port Aransas, east of Corpus Christi. The platform was shipped using a barge and installed by Heerema Marine Contractors. The jacket, which is some 1,400 feet tall, is the second tallest object ever to be moved to another position (relative to the surface of the Earth), after the Troll A platform.

The Bullwinkle platform is the third tallest freestanding structure built in water after the Petronius and Baldpate Compliant Towers, but it is the tallest of these that could be built on land as is without any modifications.

In 2010, Superior Energy Services took ownership of the platform and planned to decommission it at the end of its economic life.

== See also ==
- List of tallest oil platforms
- List of tallest freestanding steel structures
- Offshore oil and gas in the US Gulf of Mexico
- List of tallest freestanding structures
