= SSCV Sleipnir =

Semi-submersible crane vessel launched in 2019

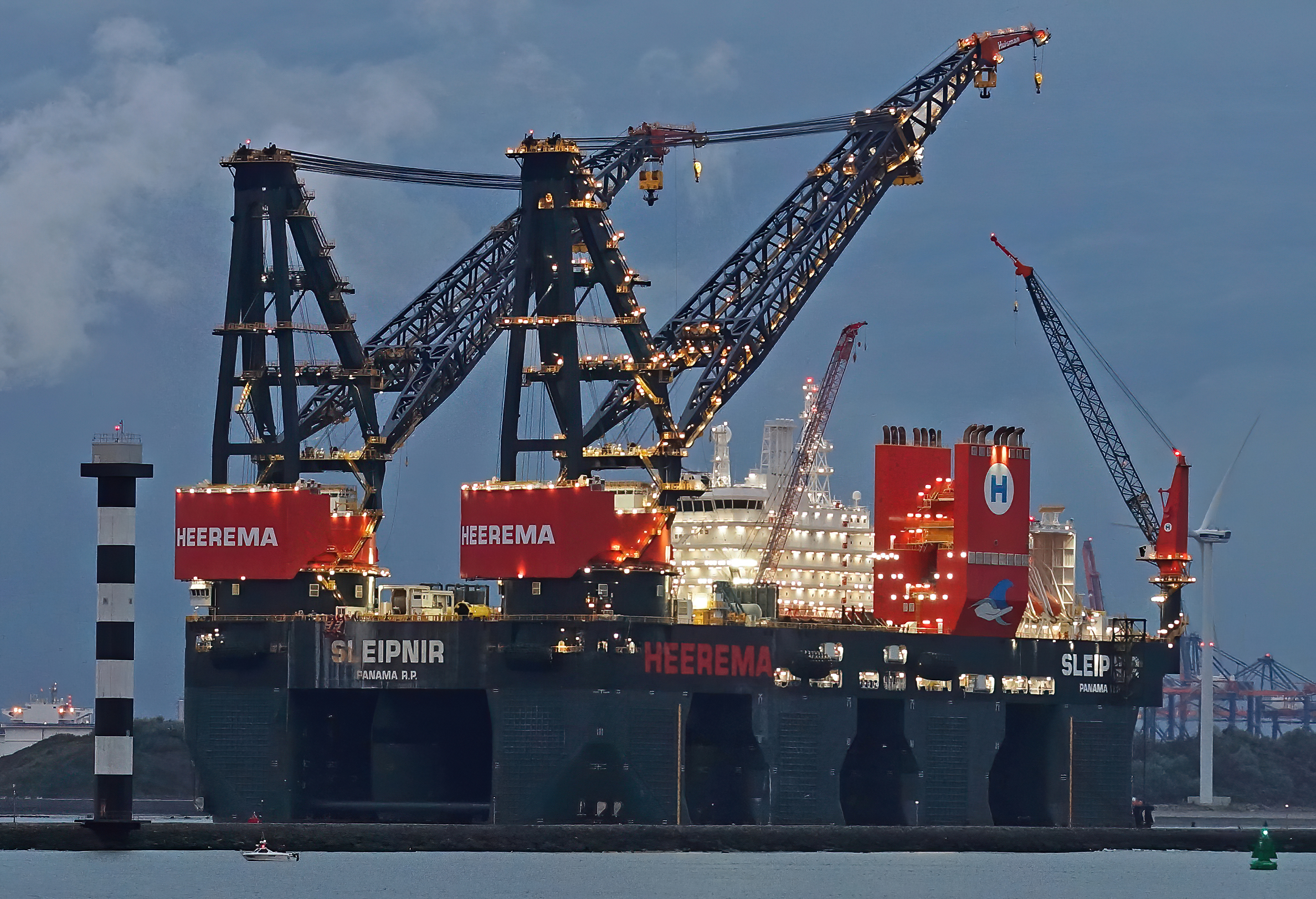
- SSCV Sleipnir (2020)

History
- Name: Sleipnir
- Owner: Heerema Marine Contractors
- Port of registry: Panama
- Ordered: March 2015
- Builder: Sembcorp Marine Singapore
- Cost: US$1.5 billion
- Christened: May 24, 2019
- Completed: 2019
- Identification: IMO number: 9781425; MMSI number: 374887000; Callsign: 3FER4
- Status: In service

General characteristics
- Type: Semi-submersible crane vessel (SSCV)
- Displacement: 273,700 t (301,700 short tons)
- Length: 220 m (720 ft)
- Beam: 102 m (335 ft)
- Draft: 12 to 32 m (39 to 105 ft)
- Installed power: 12 × 8 MW dual-fuel engines (MGO or LNG)
- Propulsion: 8 Wärtsilä azimuth thrusters (4 forward, 4 aft), 5.5 MW each
- Speed: 10 kn (19 km/h; 12 mph) cruise
- Crew: Up to 400

SSCV Sleipnir is a semi-submersible crane vessel (SSCV) owned and operated by the Netherlands-based Heerema Marine Contractors. It was ordered in 2015 and built in Singapore by Sembcorp Marine. It was named for Sleipnir, the eight-legged horse ridden by Odin in Norse mythology.

The vessel is equipped with two revolving cranes built by Huisman Equipment B.V., each with a capacity of 10,000 t (11,000 short tons); the main cranes can be operated in tandem to jointly lift 20,000 t (22,000 short tons).

After its completion in 2019, SSCV Sleipnir succeeded Heerema's earlier SSCV Thialf as the largest crane vessel in the world.

== Design ==
The vessel is essentially a large platform supported by eight columns (four on each side), with one pontoon per side. Typical SSCVs use larger columns under the cranes to provide support, which can lead to severe pitching in rough seas; SSCV Sleipnir uses columns that are symmetrical fore and aft for calmer motions under higher sea states. The columns are rounded to reduce wave interactions, and the pontoons are streamlined to reduce drag.

The ship's ballast tanks and LNG storage are contained within the eight columns. Each column is 23.75 m (77.9 ft) tall and has a staircase connecting the deck with the pontoon below.

=== Cranes ===
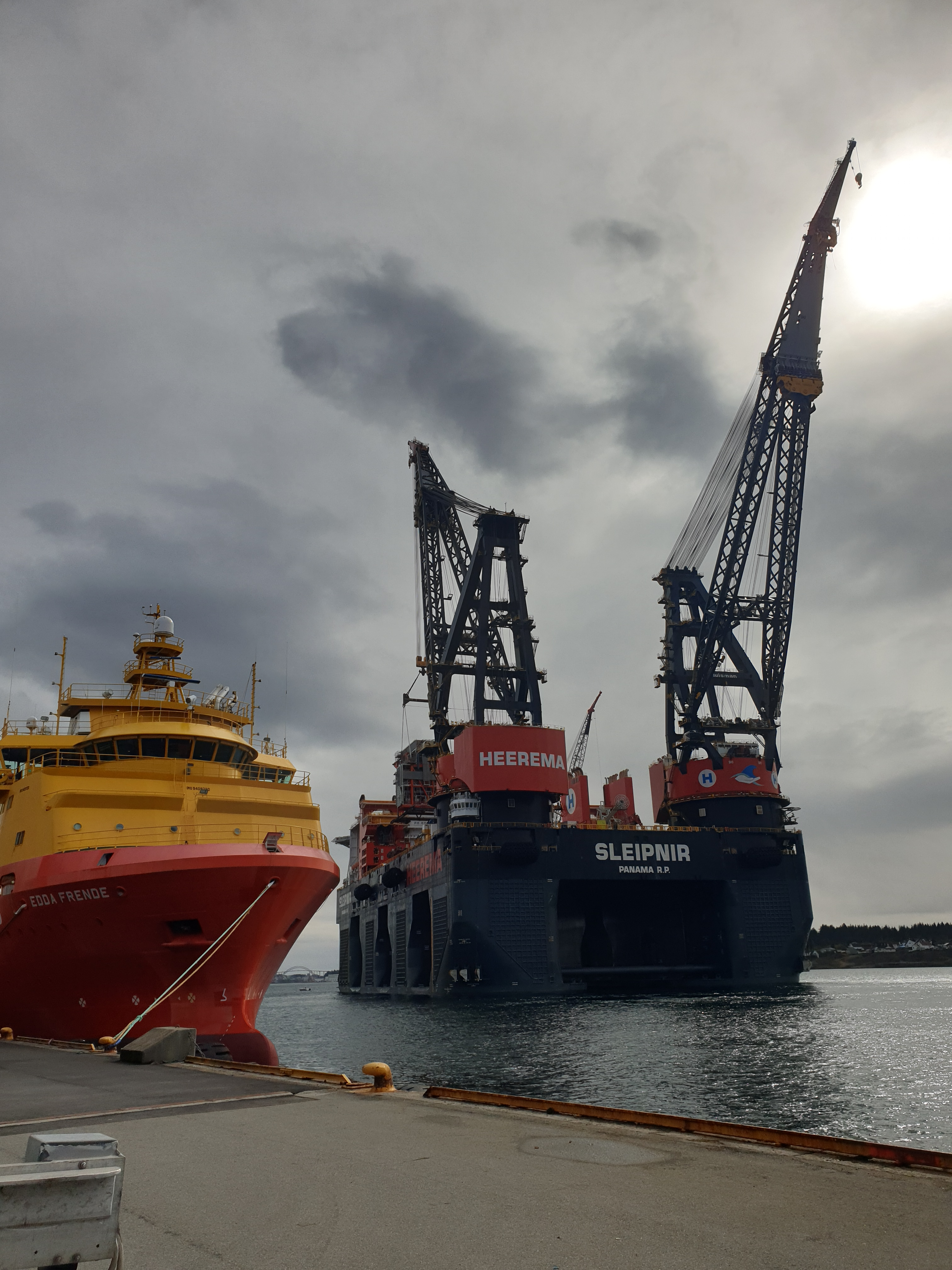
Sleipnir outside Aibel in Haugesund, Norway

The two large port and starboard tub-mounted cranes are provided by Huisman; overall boom length is 144 m (472 ft). The slewing system, which allows the cranes to rotate in their tub, uses the world's largest bearings at 30 m (98 ft) in diameter. Conventional tub-mounted cranes ride on bogies or wheels, while the Huisman 10,000t cranes use the bearing directly. Prior to the cranes for Sleipnir, the largest bearings Huisman had used for tub-mounted cranes were only 12 m (39 ft) in diameter. The crane house is secured to the foundation using 1,100 bolts 82 mm (3.2 in) in diameter, each weighing more than 40 kg (88 lb), and held in place by nuts.

Each luffing frame weighs 1,170 t (1,290 short tons), and each boom weighs 1,465 t (1,615 short tons). The large port and starboard cranes were fabricated at Huisman's factory in Xiamen, China, and shipped in pieces to Singapore; the BigRoll RoRo ships Baffin (now BigLift Baffin) and Beaufort were used to ferry the crane houses, luffing frames, winch frames and booms along with other large pieces in 2018.

Using the main hoist, each crane is capable of lifting a maximum of 10,000 t (11,000 short tons) at a radius between 27 and 48 m (89 and 157 ft); lifting capacity drops to 7,000 t (7,700 short tons) at a radius of up to 62 metres (203 ft), and 4,000 t (4,400 short tons) at 82 m (269 ft) radius; the maximum operating radius using the main hoist is 102 metres (335 ft). Objects can be lifted and lowered using the main hoist from 20 m (66 ft) below the waterline to 135 m (443 ft) above it when SSCV Sleipnir is operating at its maximum 32 m (105 ft) draft. The main hoists were tested to 110% of rated load using the modified barge H-408 during sea trials in June 2019. These cranes each use approximately 33 km (21 mi) of braided wire rope, 72 mm (2.8 in) thick.

These two large cranes are also equipped with an auxiliary hoist capable of lifting 2,500 t (2,800 short tons) at a radius between 33 and 60 metres (108 and 197 ft). Using the auxiliary hoist, objects can be lifted and lowered from 50 m (160 ft) below the waterline to 165 m (541 ft) above it when SSCV Sleipnir is operating at its maximum 32 m (105 ft) draft.

The main cranes are also equipped with a third (whip) hoist. The whip hoist is capable of lifting 200 t (220 short tons) at a radius between 37 and 153 m (121 and 502 ft) from 100 m (330 ft) below the waterline to 181 m (594 ft) above it at maximum draft.

Sleipnir is equipped with a third, auxiliary, crane at the opposite end of the ship, near the berths. The auxiliary crane is capable of lifting (or lowering) 70 t (77 short tons) at a radius up to 12 m (39 ft) down to 2,000 m (6,600 ft) below the waterline; capacity reduces to 25 t (28 short tons) at 60 m (200 ft) radius and 8 t (8.8 short tons) at 72 m (236 ft) radius. Huisman provided the auxiliary crane as well.

=== Power ===
Power for the ship is provided by 12 MAN 8L51/60DF inline eight-cylinder four-stroke engines equipped with selective catalytic reduction (SCR) to achieve IMO Tier III emissions. "DF" denotes dual-fuel, which means the engines can operate on either low-sulfur Marine Gas Oil (MGO) or liquefied natural gas (LNG). They are grouped into four engine rooms, with three engines per room.

Each engine has a maximum continuous output of 7.8 MW (10,500 bhp) at 500 RPM (rising to 8 MW (11,000 bhp) at 514 RPM), with an overall size (L×W×H) of 10.1 m × 3.2 m × 5.3 m (33 ft × 10 ft × 17 ft), weighing 135 t (149 short tons).

The fuel capacity is 8,000 m^{3} (280,000 cu ft) of LNG, which allows Sleipnir to cross the Atlantic or remain on station for one month. Heerema intends to use primarily LNG fuel, except where terminals lack the infrastructure to provide LNG bunkers. SCR will be used with MGO to reduce NO_{x} emissions.

=== Propulsion ===
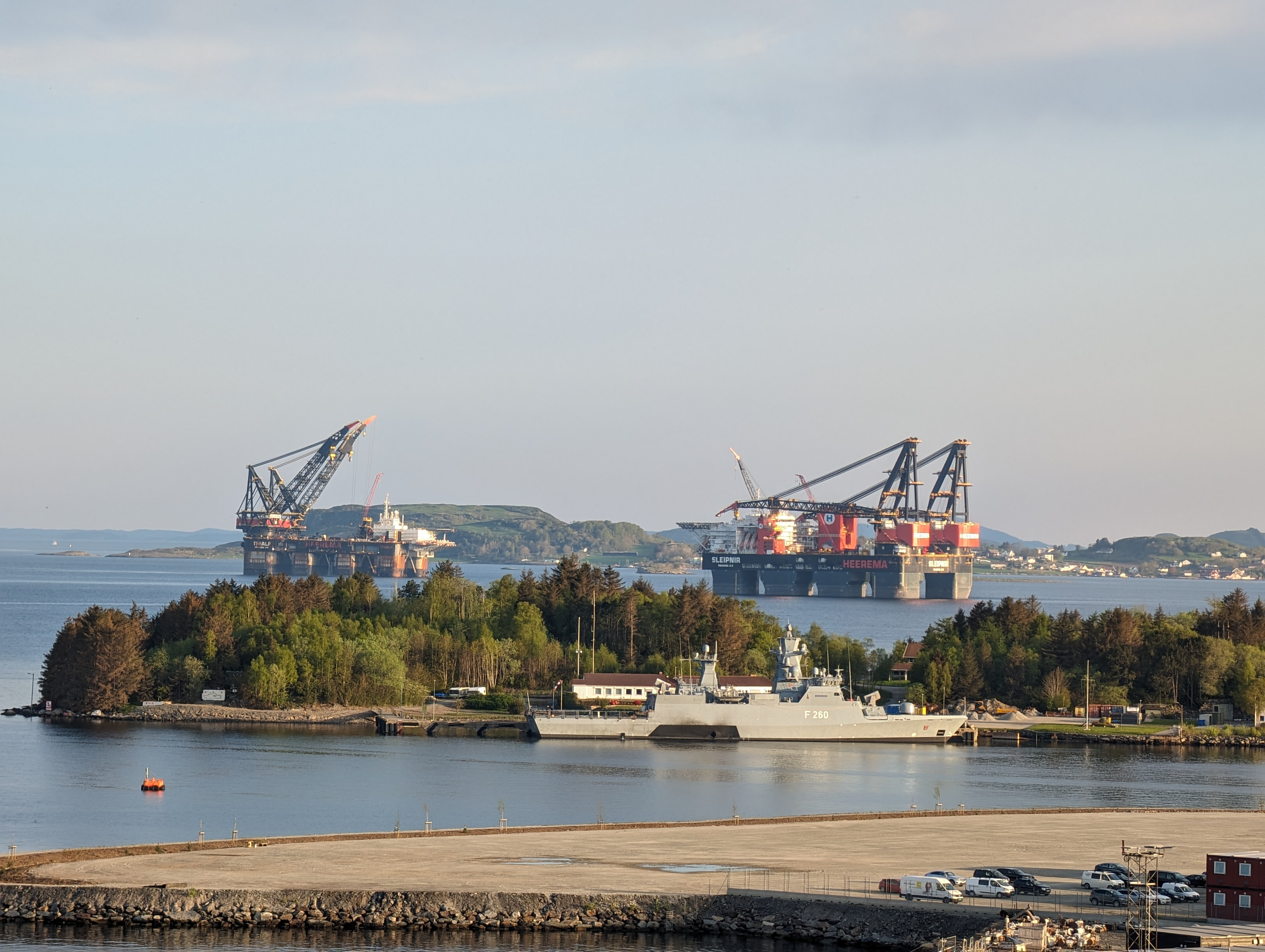
Thialf and Sleipnir in Stavanger, May 2024. German corvette Braunschweig in the foreground.

The ship is propelled by a total of eight Wärtsilä azimuth thrusters, arranged with four at the forward end and four at the stern; each thruster has an output of 5.5 MW. The four forward thrusters are retractable, designated WST-65RU; aft thrusters are designated WST-65U and are not retractable. All eight thrusters are underwater mountable, meaning the ship does not need to be drydocked to replace a thruster unit.

For SSCV Sleipnir, the forward thrusters are retractable to increase overall efficiency and protect them from damage in shallow waters; a rack-and-pinion system is used to retract the thrusters with a cycle time of 10 minutes. The WST-65U has a propeller 4.2 m (14 ft) in diameter driven by a propeller shaft tilted at 8° from horizontal to reduce the interaction with the hull and associated hydrodynamic losses.

During sea trials, SSCV Sleipnir reached a speed of 12.2 kn (22.6 km/h; 14.0 mph). Cruising speed is rated at 10 kn (19 km/h; 12 mph). The cruise speed is achieved using only the aft thrusters.

=== Stationkeeping ===
A 12-point mooring system using Stevpris Mk-6 anchors, each weighing 12 t (13 short tons), and 1,750 m (5,740 ft) of wire rope is used to hold the ship's position during lifting operations. The dynamic positioning system was able to hold the ship's position to within a 30 cm × 30 cm (12 in × 12 in) area during simulated operations for sea trials.

=== Accommodations ===
The total deck area available for cargo is 12,000 m^{2} (130,000 sq ft), measuring 220 m × 120 m (720 ft × 390 ft) (L×W) with a capacity of 20,000 t (22,000 short tons). In addition, there is a circular helipad near the berths, measuring 28 m (92 ft) in diameter, capable of holding 15.6 t (17.2 short tons), which is designed for an AgustaWestland EH101 or Sikorsky S-92. The berthing area is designed to accommodate 400 people in 5 executive, 45 single, and 175 double cabins. The dining hall can hold 200 people.

SSCV Sleipnir is equipped with nine Harding FF1200 freefall lifeboat systems, including davits; each lifeboat has a capacity of 70.

== History ==
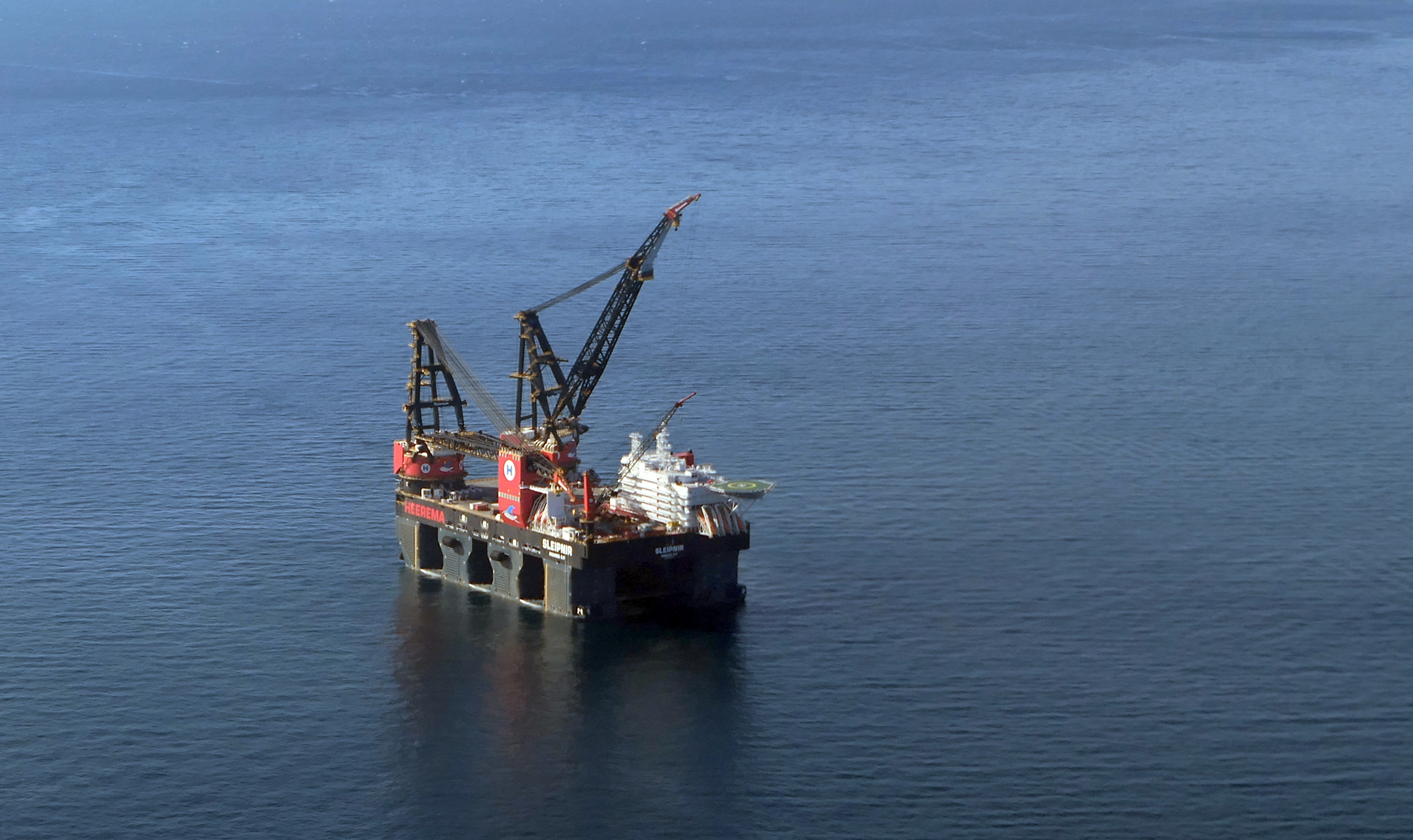
SSCV Sleipnir (Sept 2019)

Although the concept of a crane vessel larger than SSCV Thialf was studied as early as 2008, market conditions precluded formal design work until 2011. Heerema developed the concept internally from 2011 to 2012, determining the optimum vessel type and capabilities.

GVA Consultants completed preliminary conceptual studies for a new crane vessel for Heerema in March 2013, and were awarded a basic design contract in February 2014. Heerema intended for the new crane vessel to provide lifting capacities in the segment between the largest SSCVs (such as SSCV Thialf and Saipem 7000, capable of lifting 14,000 t (15,000 short tons) using deck-mounted revolving cranes) and floatover lifters (such as Pioneering Spirit, capable of 48,000 t (53,000 short tons) with significantly less flexibility). One month later, in March 2014, Heerema signed a letter of intent with Huisman to supply the world's largest offshore cranes; the cranes were to be equipped on the new crane vessel, designated NSCV, for New Semi-submersible Crane Vessel, in lieu of a name.

In March 2015, Heerema Offshore Services B.V. signed a letter of intent with Jurong Shipyard Pte Ltd to build NSCV in Singapore; Jurong's parent Sembcorp Marine announced the contract, worth US$1 billion, had been awarded on July 15, 2015. NSCV was planned to be built at Phase II of Sembcorp's Tuas Boulevard Yard, in an offshore dock measuring 255 by 110 m (837 by 361 ft), and was scheduled for delivery at the end of 2018. The drydock construction was a unique factor in Sembcorp's favor when Heerema was evaluating bids for construction. The first steel was cut for the cranes, which were being built in China, in July 2015. Heerema announced the NSCV would be named Sleipnir, for Odin's eight-legged horse, on December 18, 2015.

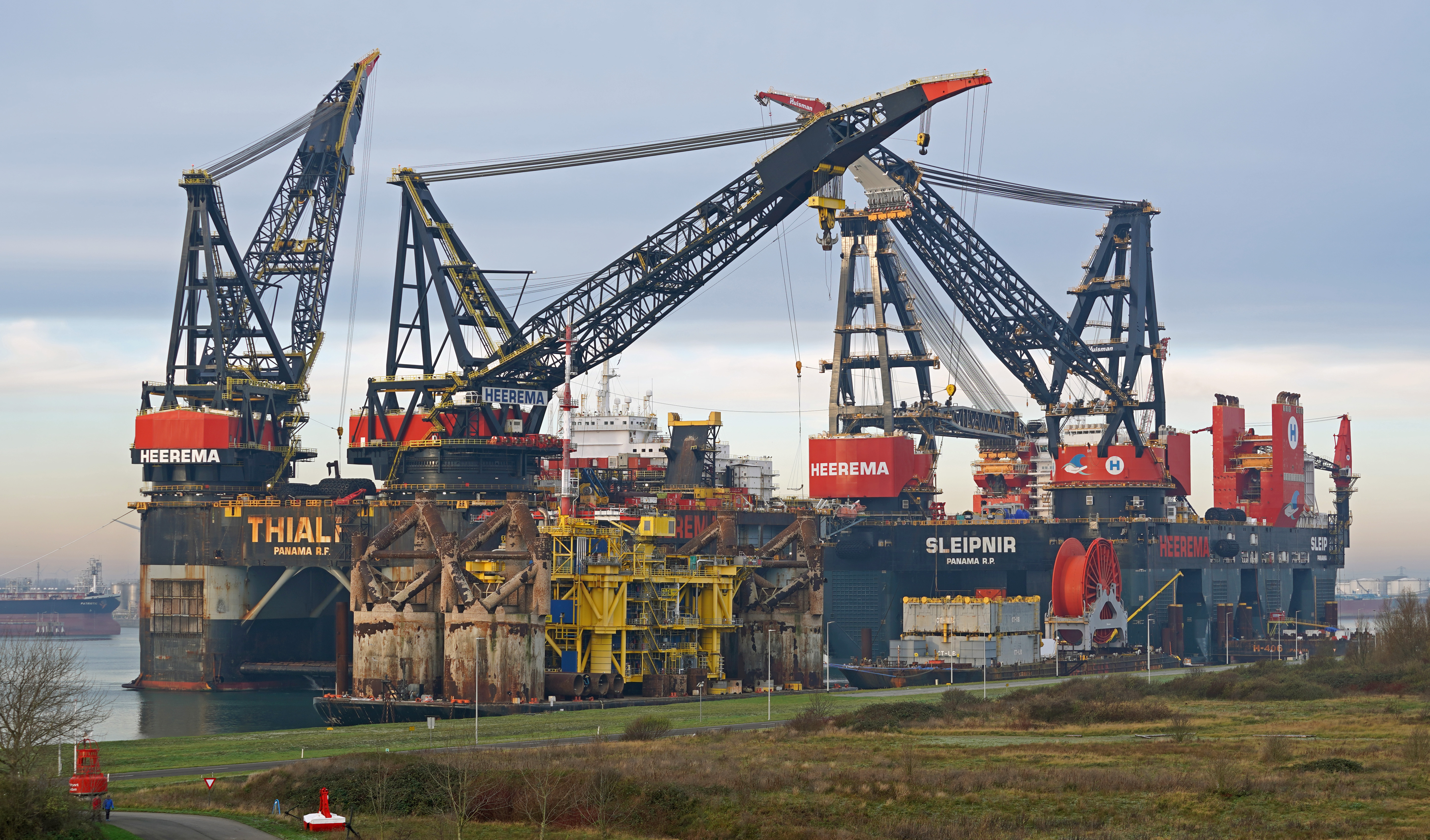
Thialf and Sleipnir, Dec 2020

The two main port and starboard cranes were installed by August 2018. The vessel was christened SSCV Sleipnir by Mrs. Maha Hatfield on May 24, 2019, and embarked on sea trials and crane load tests afterwards. Sea trials were completed in late June 2019.

=== Operations ===
Heerema booked its first contracts for SSCV Sleipnir in 2017, two years before it was completed. During the ship's maiden voyage from Singapore to Spain via the Cape of Good Hope, it set a world record for the largest LNG bunkering operation on July 10, when 3,000 t (3,300 short tons) of LNG were transferred to it off the coast of Sumatra from Coral Fraseri, chartered by Titan LNG from Anthony Veder. Coral Fraseri was scheduled to refuel Sleipnir in Spain, prior to it passing into the Mediterranean Sea.

Sleipnir completed a record lift of 15,300 t (15,100 long tons; 16,900 short tons) for the topsides of the Leviathan project for Noble Energy, in September 2019.

Sleipnir is next contracted to install the production and living quarters platforms of the Tyra Future project for Maersk Oil. The existing Tyra platforms will be picked by Sleipnir and loaded on barges for recycling. Other future contracts include Brae Bravo (jacket and topsides removal) and Hollandse Kust Zuid Alpha (HVAC platform installation).
