= PRIO S.A. =

Brazilian oil and gas company

- Formerly: PetroRio S.A. (2008–2022)
- Type: S.A. (corporation)
- Traded as: B3: PRIO3
- Industry: Energy (oil and gas)
- Founded: 2008; 18 years ago
- Headquarters: Rio de Janeiro, Brazil
- Key people: Roberto Monteiro, (CEO)
- Products: Oil platforms; FPSOs; Fixed platform; Semi-submersible platforms; LNG; Natural gas; Petroleum
- Revenue: ▲US$2.41 billion (2024)
- Operating income: ▲US$2.22 billion (2024)
- Net income: ▲US$1,73 billion (2024)
- Total assets: ▲US$9.01 billion (2024)
- Total equity: ▲US$4.19 billion (2024)
- Number of employees: 810 (2024)
- Website: www.prio3.com.br

PRIO S.A. (formerly PetroRio S.A.) is a Brazilian publicly traded company focused on oil and gas production, without investment and the recovery of producing assets, specializing in the efficient management of reservoirs and the development of mature fields.

The Company is also dedicated to the production, exploration, marketing and transportation of oil and natural gas. Currently, it is the largest private oil company in Brazil and the second largest national oil company, only behind Petrobras.

== History ==
PRIO officially updated its brand and changed its name from PetroRio to PRIO in May 2022 (Folha Vitória). The choice of the new name was inspired by the four-letter acronym (PRIO) that the oil company already used for its shares traded on the Stock Exchange (B3). According to the company, the change aimed to reposition it in the market as an "OilTech" and simplify communication, since the term already functioned as a consolidated nickname among employees, analysts, and investors. For purely formal and bureaucratic purposes, the change of the legal corporate name (from Petro Rio S.A. to Prio S.A.) was finalized and approved at a shareholders' meeting a little later, in August 2023 (Citi DR).
