= Petronius (oil platform) =

Oil platform in the Gulf of Mexico

Coordinates: 29°06′30″N 87°56′30″W

Petronius is a deepwater compliant tower oil platform built from 1997 to 2000 and operated by Chevron in the Gulf of Mexico, 210 km (130.5 mi) east-southeast of New Orleans, United States.

A compliant piled tower design, it is 640 metres (2,100 ft) high to the tip of flare boom from the mudline (sea floor) and was arguably the tallest free-standing structure in the world, until surpassed by the Burj Khalifa in 2010. This claim is disputed since only 75 metres (246 ft) of the platform are above water and it is unknown if the structure could support itself on land, as it is partially supported by buoyancy. The multi-deck topsides are 64 metres (210 ft) by 43 metres (141 ft) by 18.3 metres (60 ft) high and hold 21 well slots. The compliant tower weighs around 43,000 tons with the topside weighing in at an additional 7,500 tons Around 9,600 m^{3} (60,000 barrels) of oil and 3,000,000 m^{3} (100 million cubic feet) of natural gas are extracted daily by the platform.

The platform is situated to exploit the Petronius field, discovered in 1995 in Viosca Knoll (block VK 786) and named after Petronius, the Roman writer. The seabed is 535 m (1,754 ft) below the platform. The compliant tower design is more flexible than conventional land structures to cope better with sea forces. It can deflect (sway) in excess of 2% of height. Most buildings are kept to within 0.5% of height in order to have occupants not feel uneasy during periods of movement.

Construction began in 1997 by J Ray McDermott with the seabed mooring system. The contract for the platform was budgeted at $200 million with total costs of around $500 million. The 4000-tonne North Module was installed in November 1998, but the attempt to install the slightly lighter South Module in December of that year ended with the unit on the seabed. A replacement module was built and installed by Saipem 7000 in May 2000.

== See also ==
- List of tallest freestanding steel structures
- List of tallest oil platforms
- List of tallest structures
- Offshore oil and gas in the US Gulf of Mexico
