= Compliant tower =

Type of offshore fixed rig structure

A compliant tower (CT) is a fixed rig structure normally used for the offshore production of oil or gas. The rig consists of narrow, flexible (compliant) towers and a piled foundation supporting a conventional deck for drilling and production operations. Compliant towers are designed to sustain significant lateral deflections and forces, and are typically used in water depths ranging from 1,500 to 3,000 feet (450 to 900 m). These structures are considered freestanding but media supported (by water). They demonstrate static stability but have a much greater degree of lateral deformation/flexibility vs land-base structures, up to 2.5% vs 0.5% and are partially supported by buoyancy. It is unknown if these structures could support themselves as built if they were constructed on land. At present the deepest is the Chevron Petronius tower located in water 623m deep.

With the use of flex elements such as flex legs or axial tubes, resonance is reduced and wave forces are de-amplified. This type of rig structure can be configured to adapt to existing fabrication and installation equipment. Compared with floating systems, such as tension-leg platforms and SPARs, the production risers are conventional and are subjected to less structural demands and flexing. However, because of cost, it becomes uneconomical to build compliant towers in depths greater than 1,000 meters. In such a case a floating production system is more appropriate, even with the increased cost of risers and mooring. Despite its flexibility, the compliant tower system is strong enough to withstand hurricane conditions.

The first tower emerged in the early 1980s with the installation of Exxon's Lena oil platform.

== Process of launching shown on Benguela Belize Base Tower ==
On April 15, 2005 the Base Tower of Benguela Belize was launched from the barge H-851. The Base Tower makes up the first 250 metres of the more than 400 metre high tower. The crane vessel that is partly visible is the Thialf. This is the heaviest compliant tower installed to date and the first outside of the Gulf of Mexico.

=== Image gallery ===
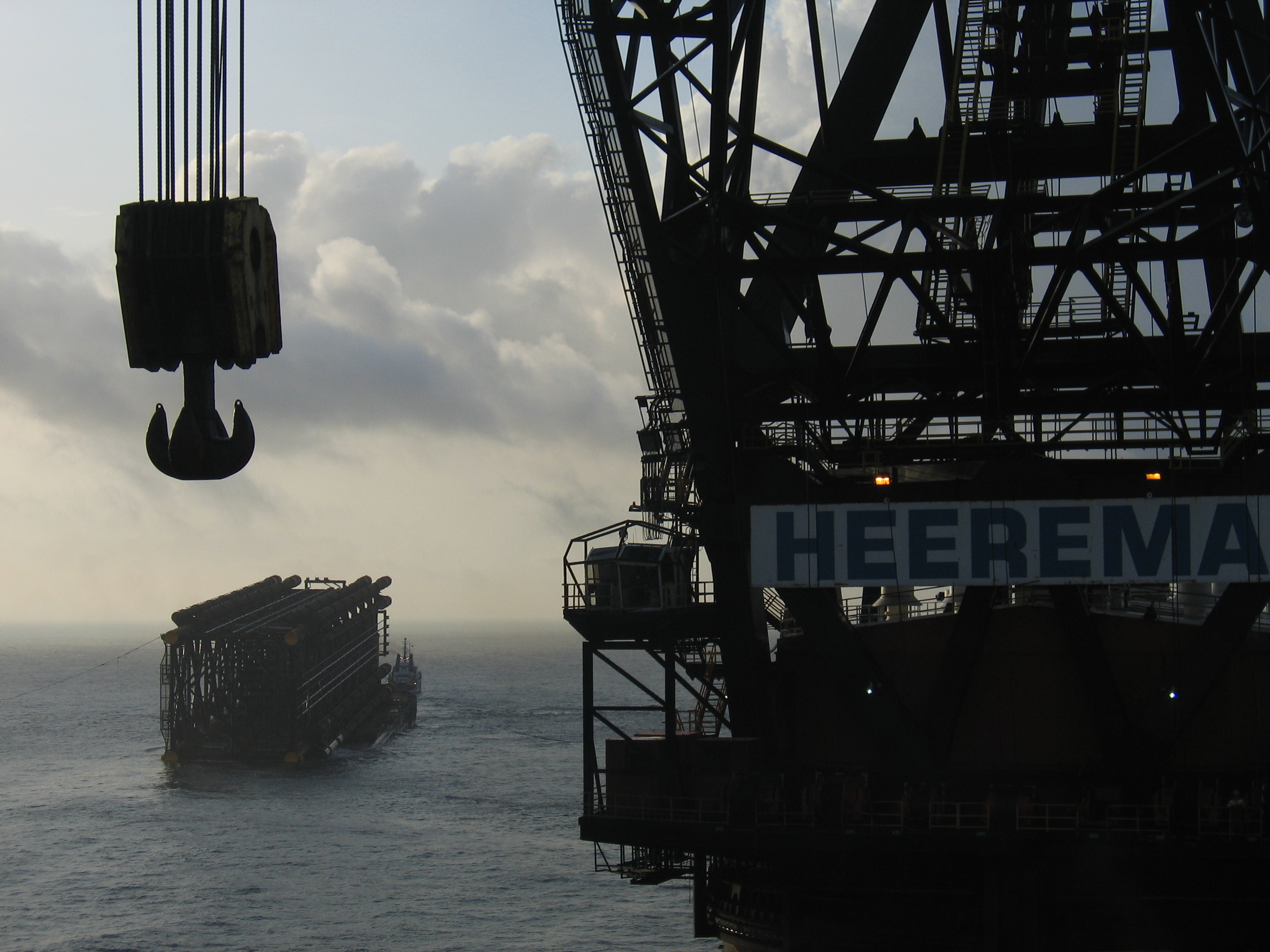
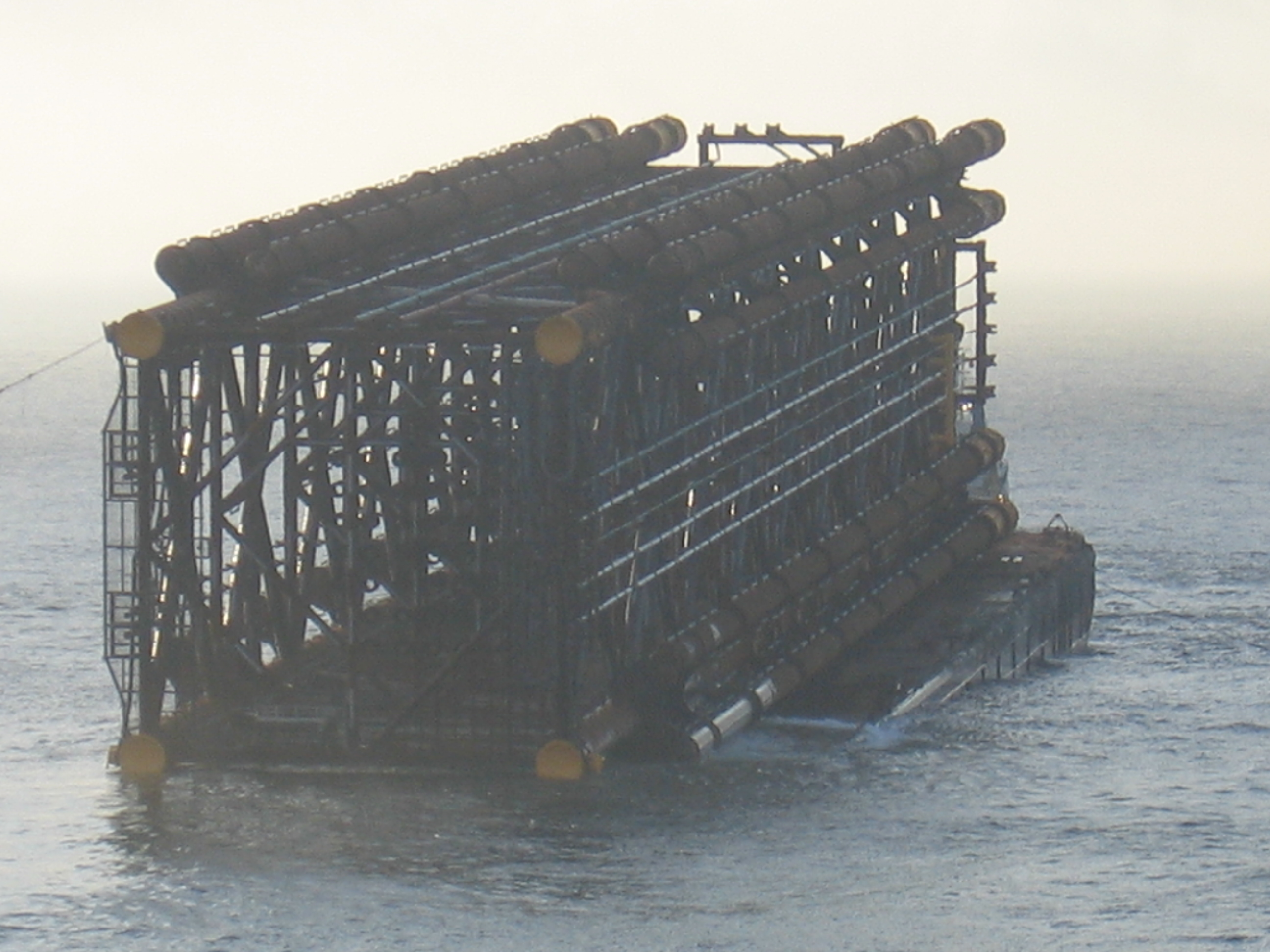
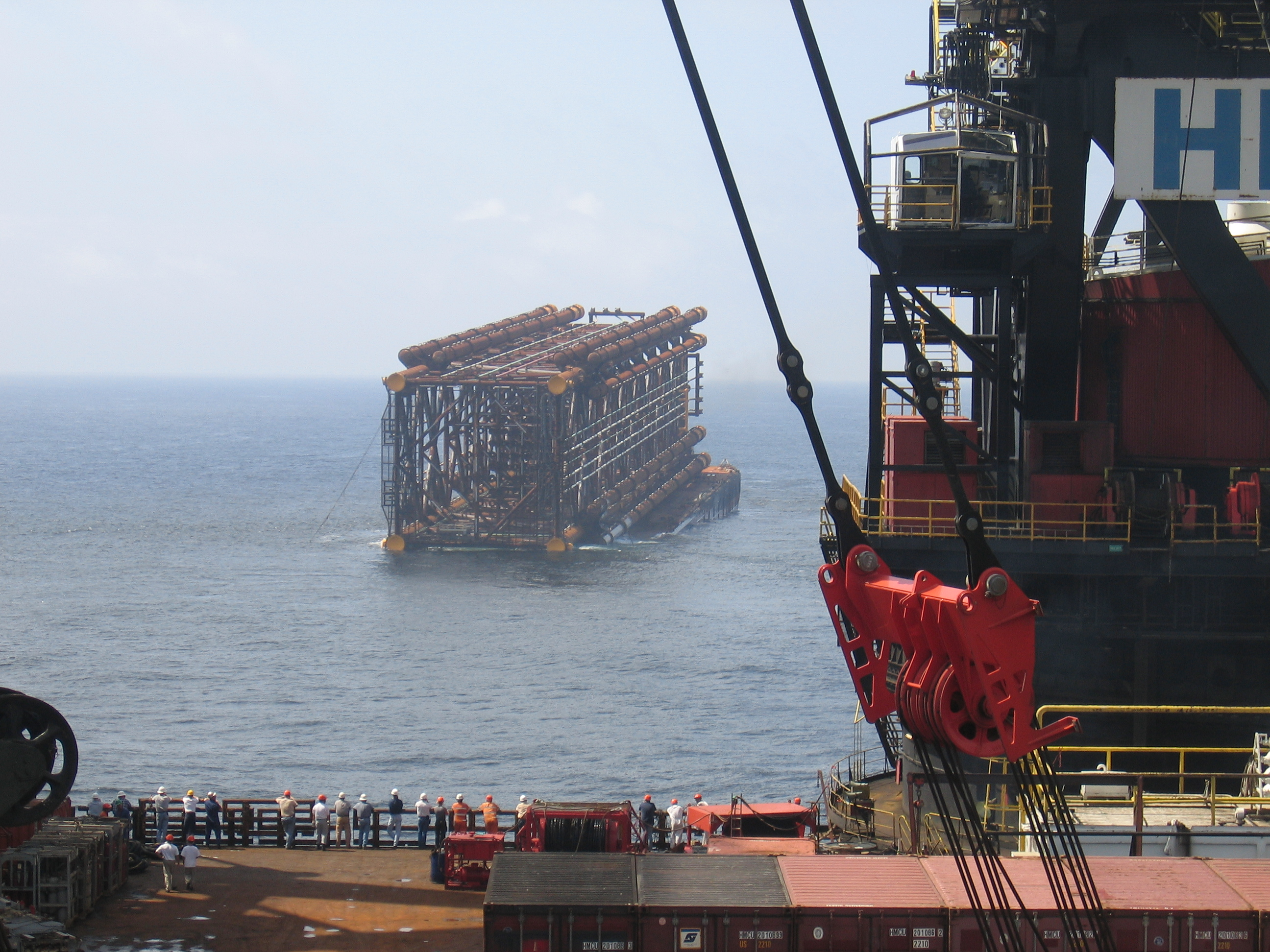
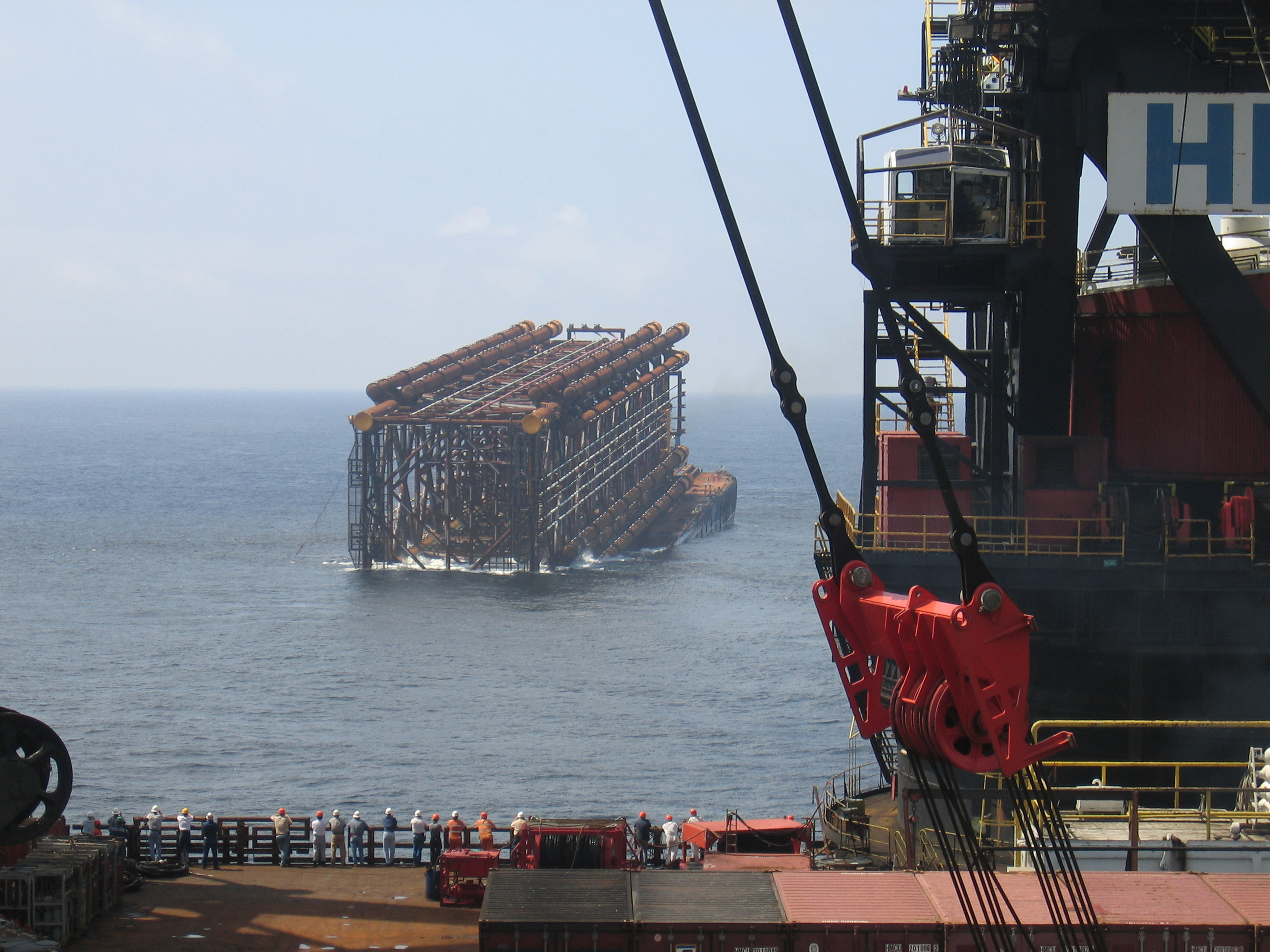
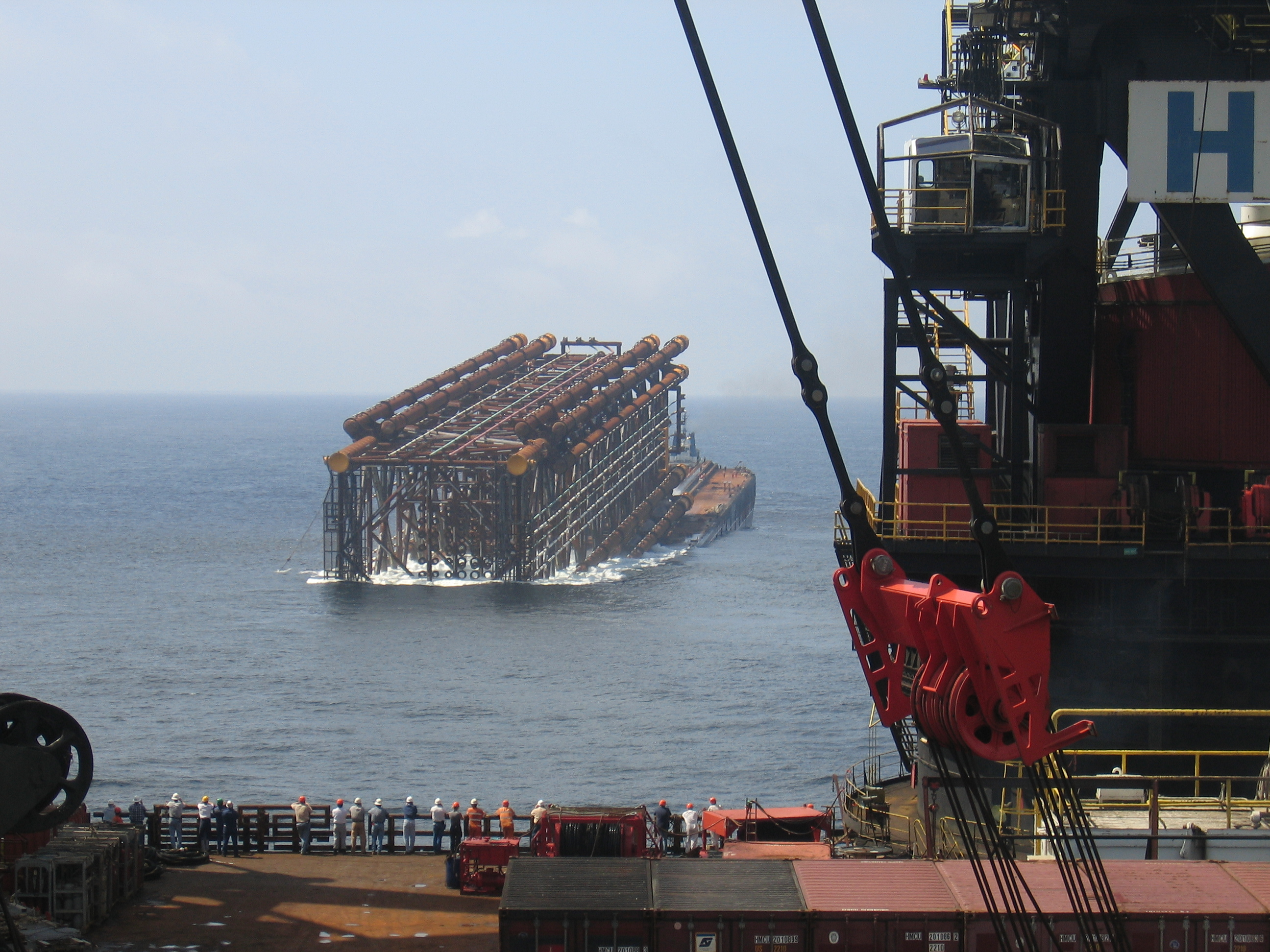
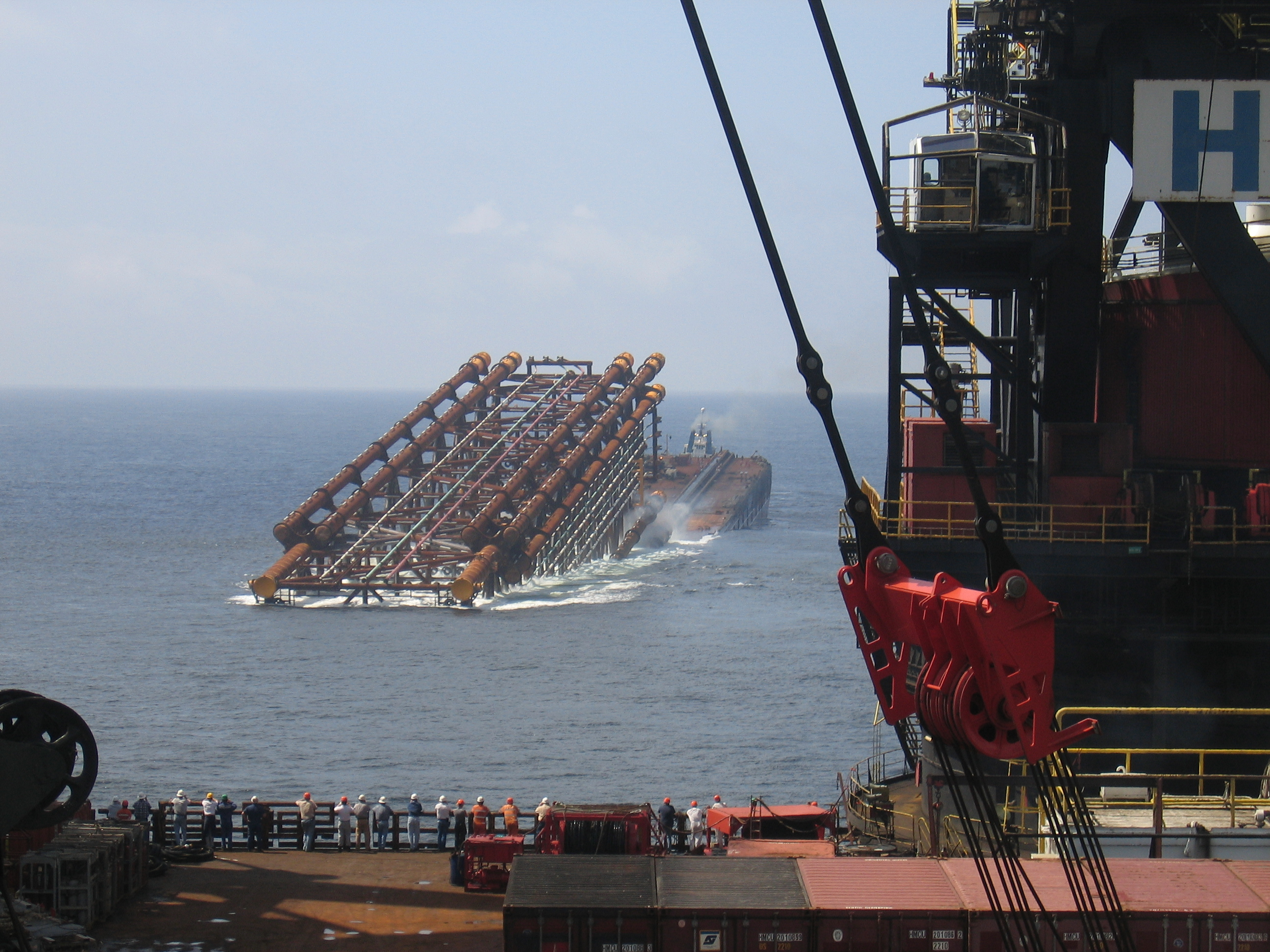
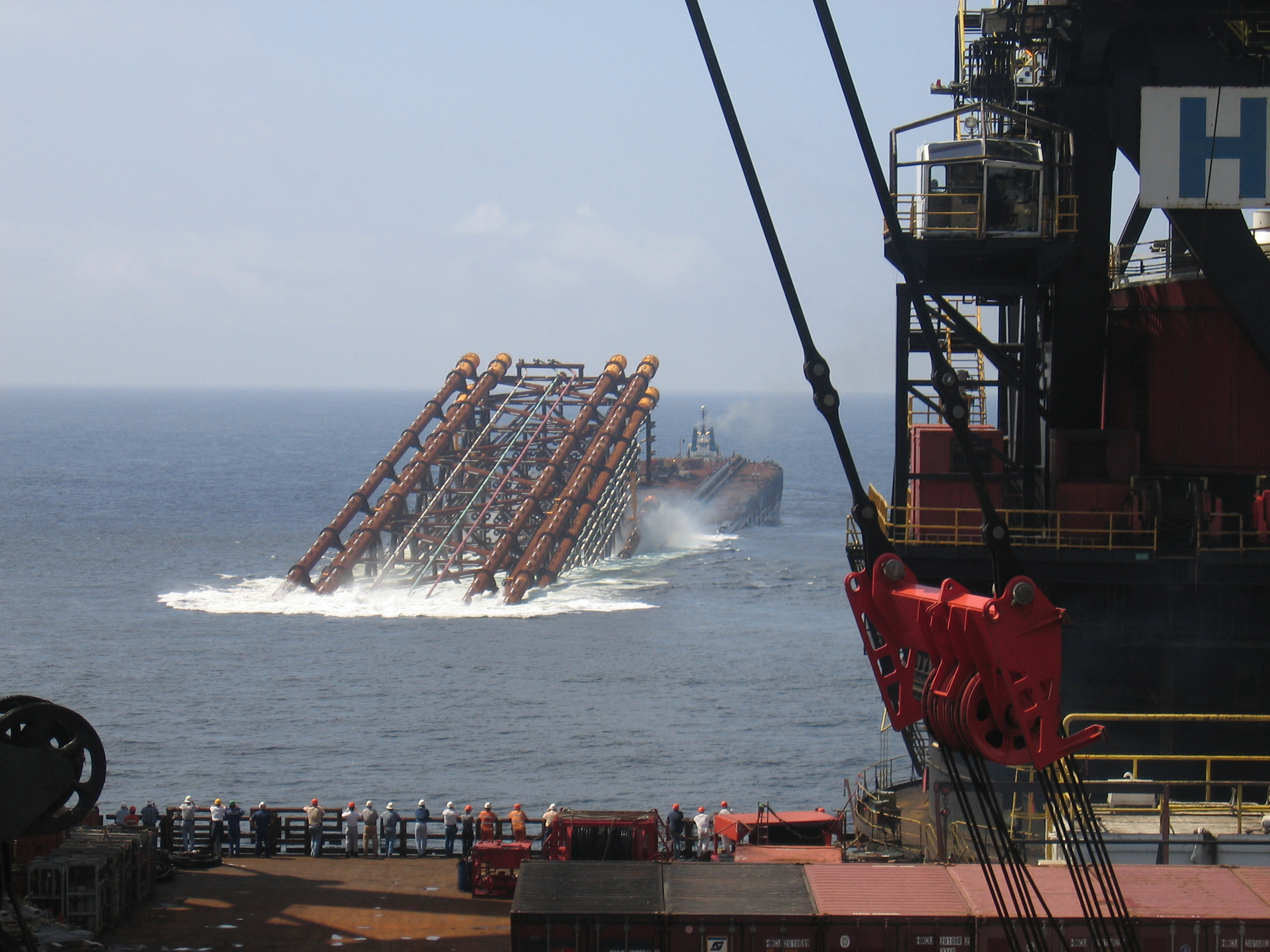
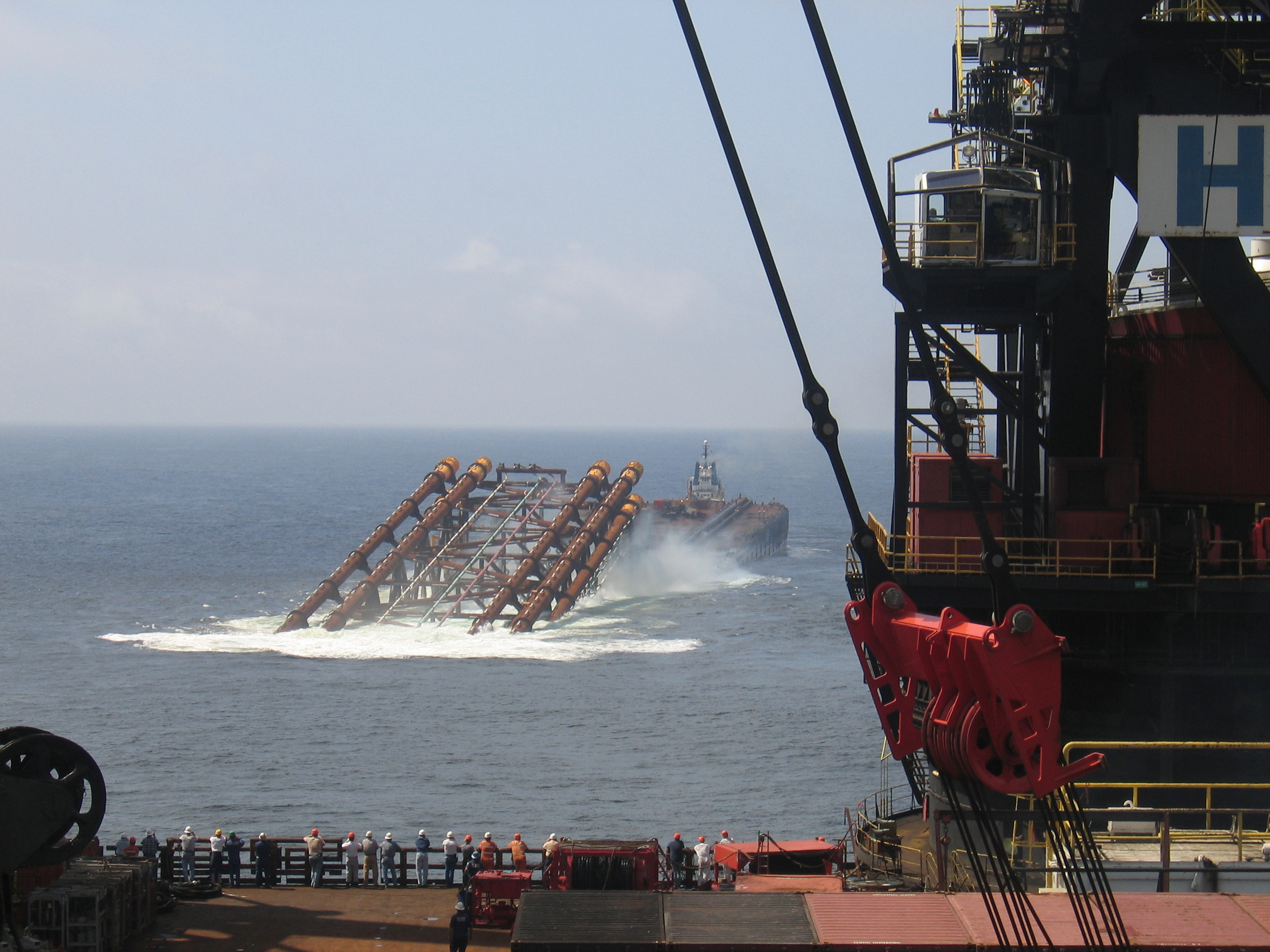
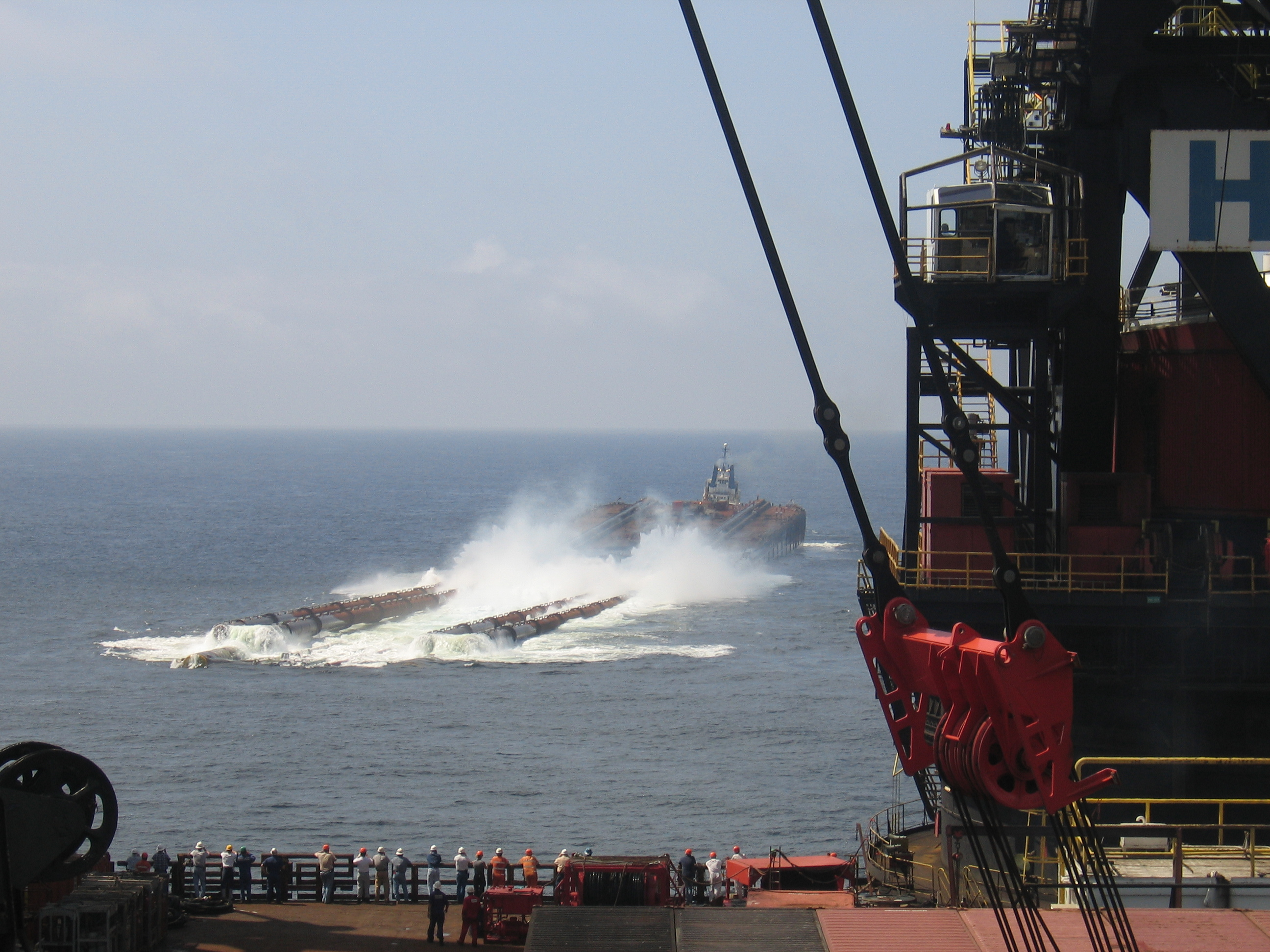
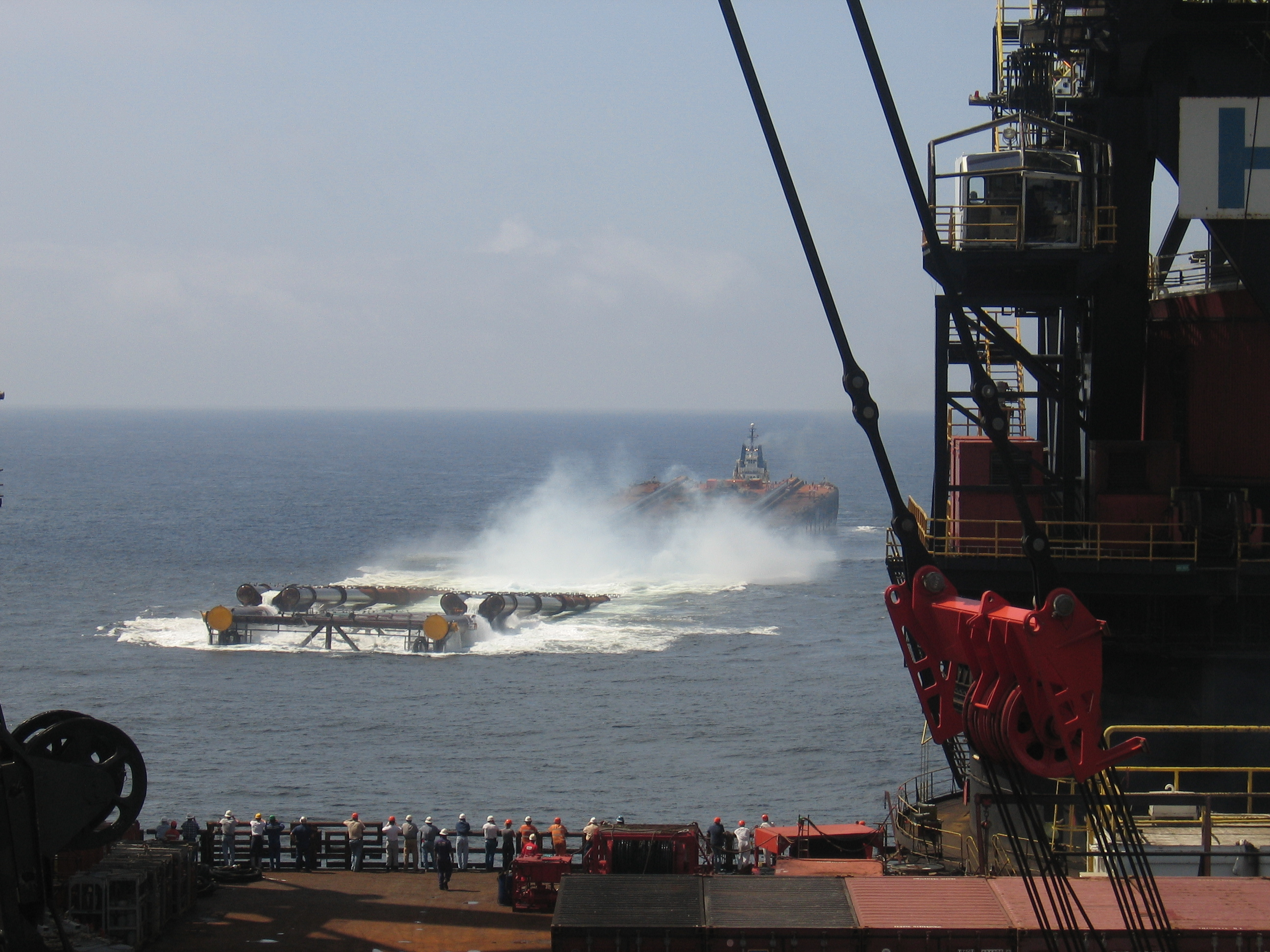
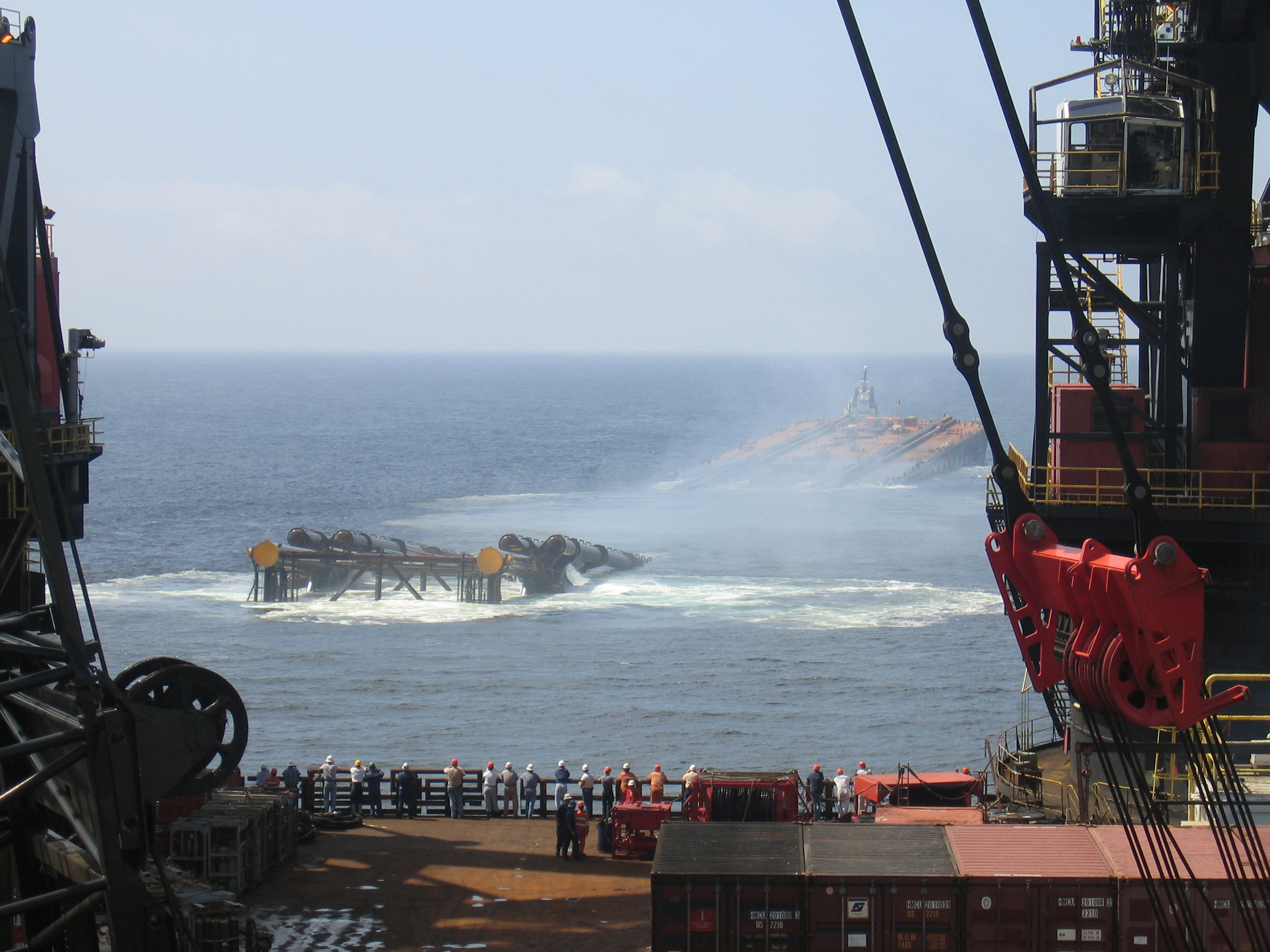
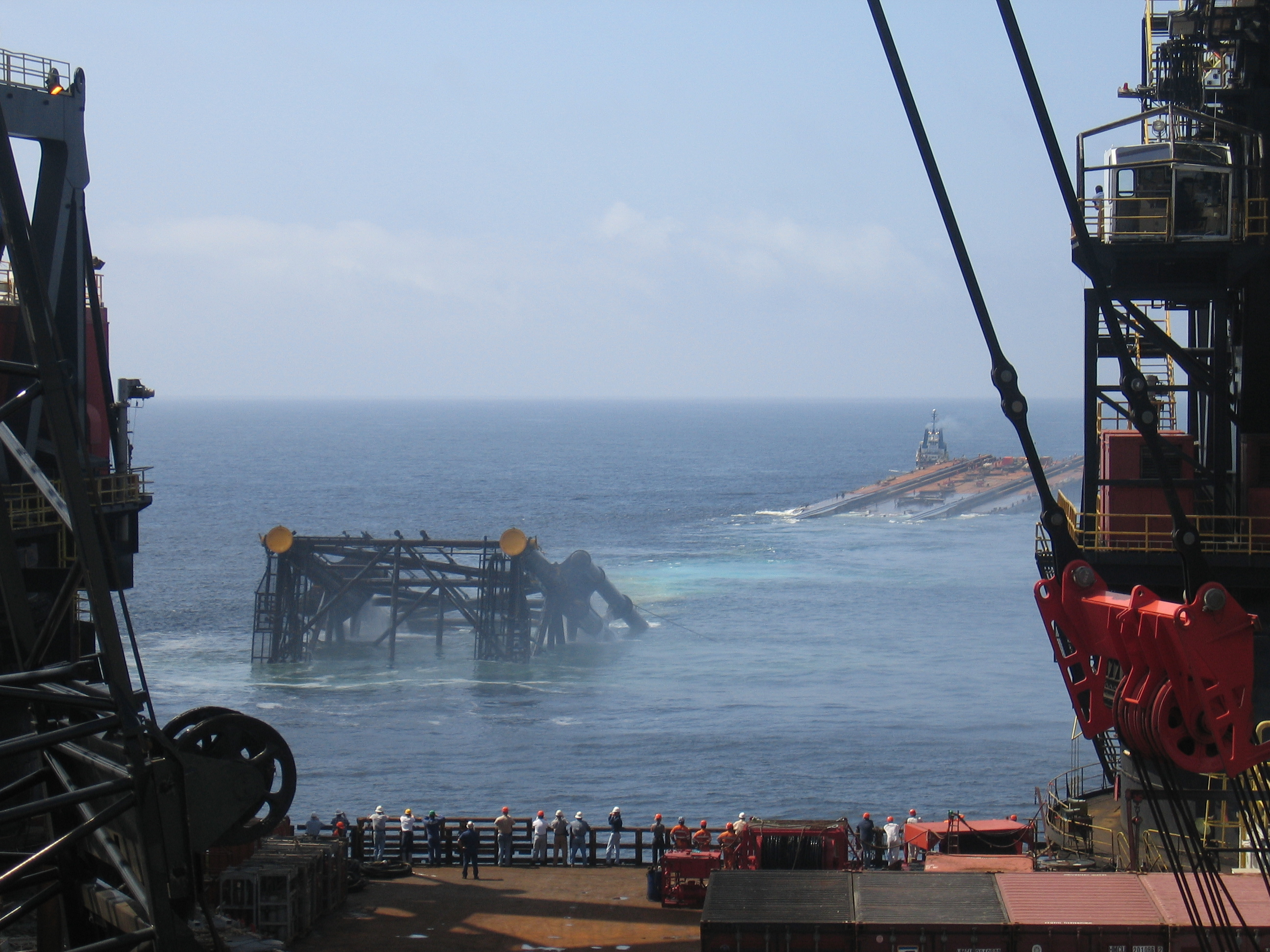
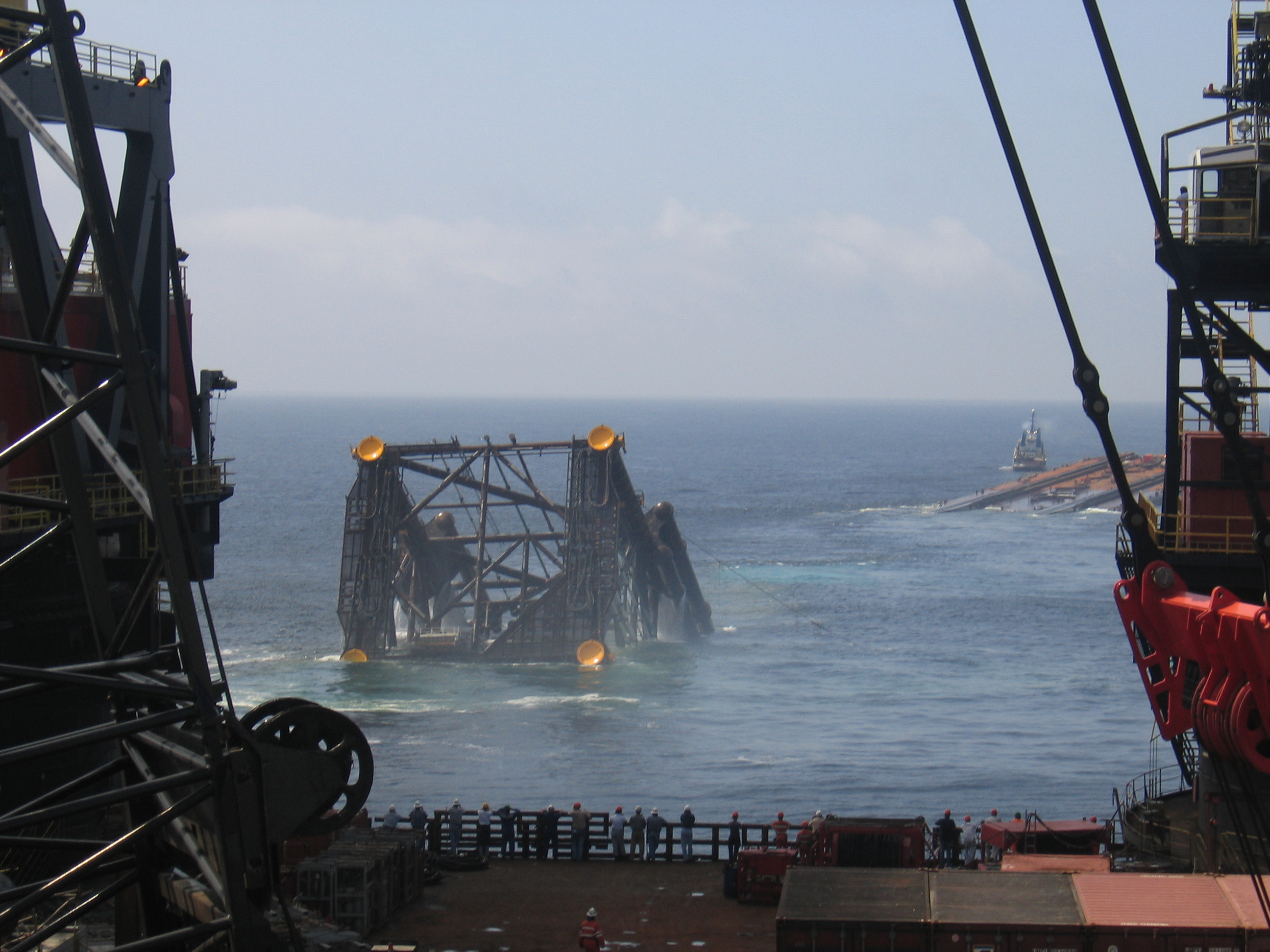
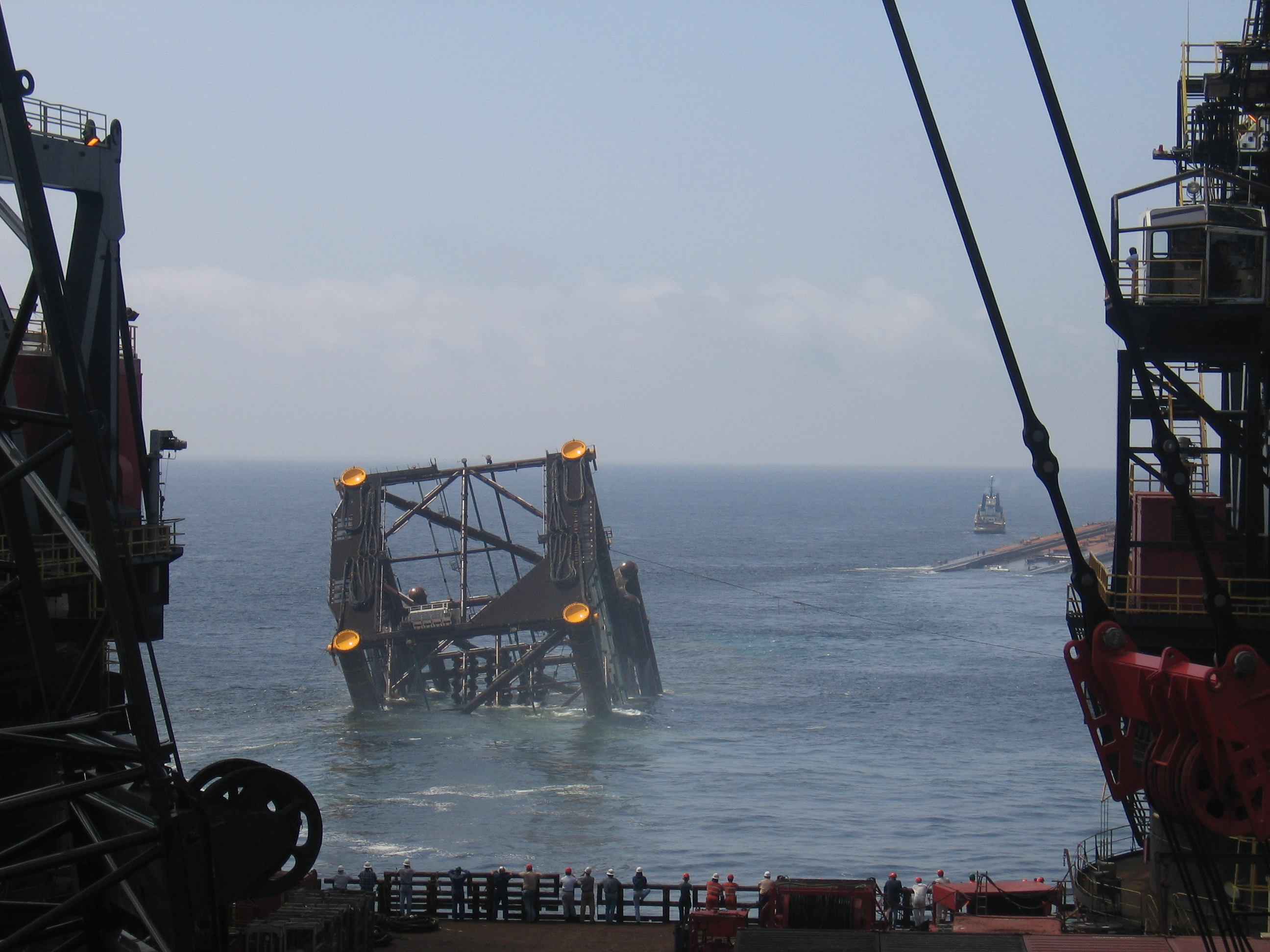
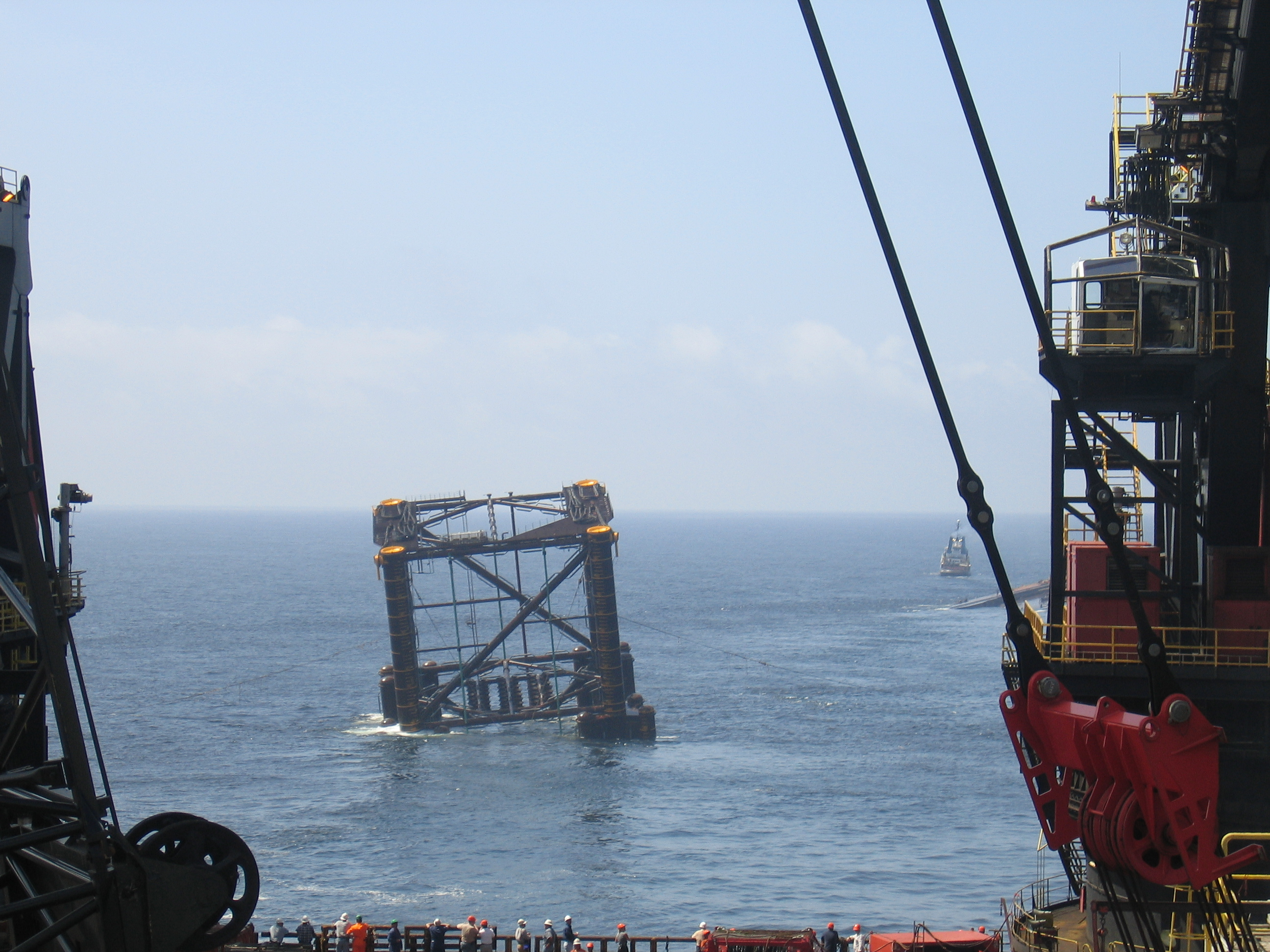
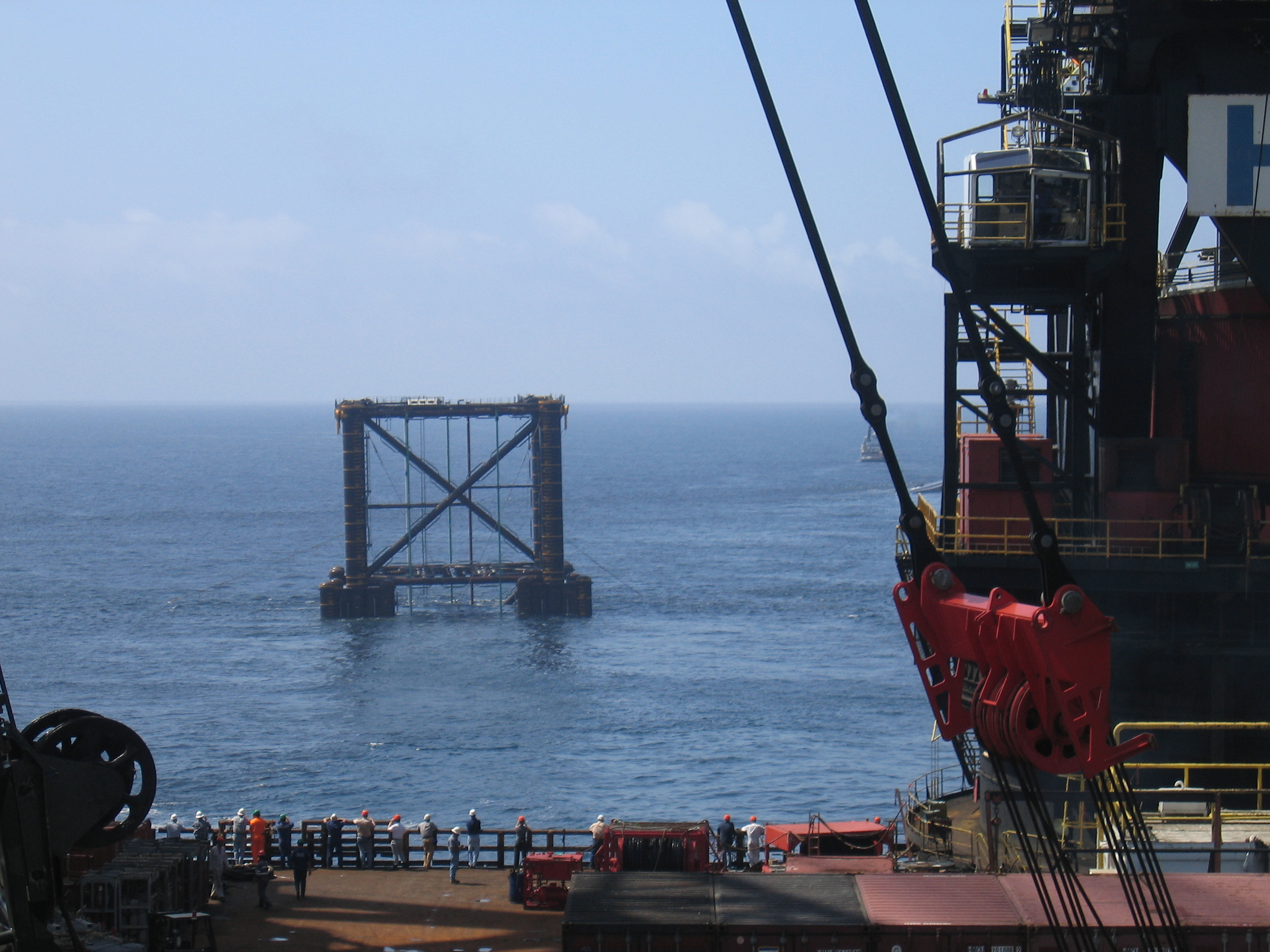

== See also ==
- Oil platform
- List of tallest oil platforms
- List of tallest freestanding steel structures
- Petronius Compliant Tower
- Baldpate (oil platform)
- Benguela-Belize Lobito-Tomboco Platform
