= Saipem 7000 =

Semi-submersible crane vessel

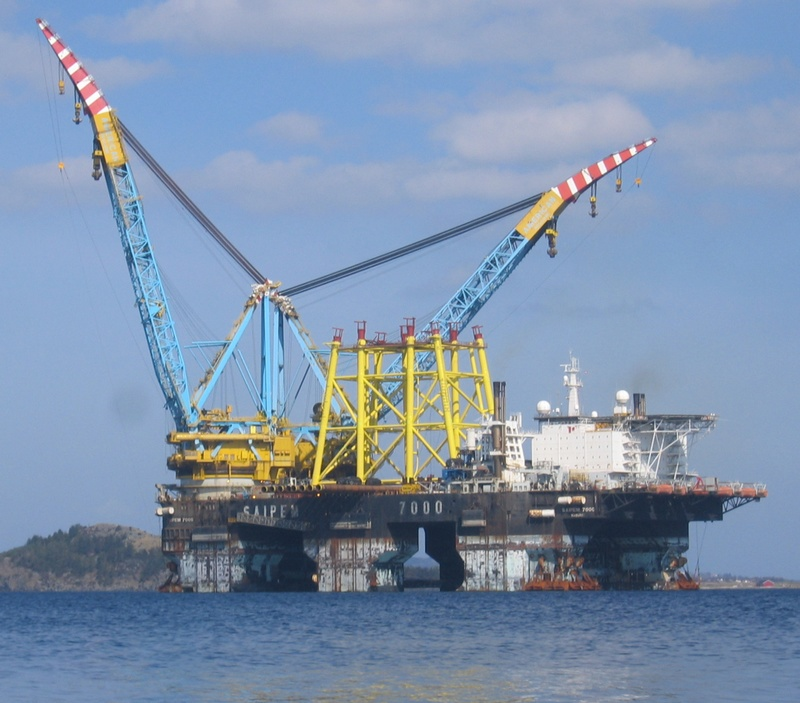
- Saipem 7000 is the world's third largest crane vessel

History
- Name: Saipem 7000; Micoperi 7000 (1987–1995)
- Operator: Saipem
- Ordered: 1985
- Builder: Fincantieri Monfalcone Yard
- Laid down: 1985
- Launched: 1986
- Completed: 1987
- In service: 1988-to date
- Identification: Call sign C6NO5; IMO number: 8501567; MMSI number: 309461000
- Status: In service

General characteristics
- Type: Semi-submersible crane vessel
- Displacement: 172,000 t (169,000 long tons) (heavy lift)
- Length: 198 m (649 ft 7 in) (overall)
- Beam: 87 m (285 ft 5 in)
- Height: 43.5 m (142 ft 9 in) (keel to deck)
- Draft: 10.5 m (34 ft 5 in) (transit); 18.0 m (59 ft 1 in) (survival); 27.5 m (90 ft 3 in) (heavy lift)
- Installed power: 70,000 kW (94,000 hp)
- Propulsion: 12 thrusters
- Speed: 9.5 knots (17.6 km/h; 10.9 mph)
- Crew: Up to 700 persons

Saipem 7000 is the world's third largest semi-submersible crane vessel, after the SSCV Sleipnir and the SSCV Thialf. It is owned by the Italian oil and gas industry contractor Saipem S.p.A.

== History ==
=== Construction ===
The vessel was designed by Gusto Engineering during 1984.

The vessel was built between 1985 and 1987 by Fincantieri-Cantieri Navali Italiana S.p.A. at their Monfalcone yard, Trieste in north-eastern Italy. The vessel was built in two halves in a long dry dock. The halves were then floated out from the dry dock and mated. During the mating operation the halves were supported by temporary pontoons.

The hull mating was complete in early 1987 and the two cranes built by Officine Meccaniche Reggiane under subcontract to American Hoist & Derrick Company (Amhoist) were installed in sections by the Saipem crane vessel Castoro Otto in April of that year. The sea trials, which took two months, started in September, and on 15 December the vessel was handed over to Micoperi.

The cost of the vessel was not released by Micoperi but it was estimated in the technical press as being up to US$400 million.

=== Early projects ===
The vessel's first work was for Petrobras the Brazilian state oil company. The project consisted of the installation of 7 platforms in the Campos Basin. During this project the Micoperi 7000 was also involved in the fighting of a well fire on the Enchova Platform. The Micoperi 7000 then proceeded to the Gulf of Mexico where it installed the Jolliet Template for Conoco. In 1989 the Micoperi 7000 arrived in the North Sea for the first time where it completed several projects in the Norwegian sector of the North Sea. These were the Gyda Platform for BP, the Togi Template for Norsk Hydro and the Veslefrikk platform for Statoil. In 1990 and 1991, the Micoperi was used in the construction and assembly of the Mossgas FA platform off the south coast of South Africa near a town called Mossel Bay.

Whilst the vessel remained busy, Micoperi were struggling financially as the low oil price prevalent in the late 1980s curtailed oil company investment. In 1991 Micoperi were forced to sell a number of their major assets including the Micoperi 7000 to another Italian contractor Saipem. Saipem took over the running of the vessel though they retained the vessel crew and the shorebased engineering support. Saipem renamed the vessel the Saipem 7000.

The vessel continued to work, installing oil and gas production platforms, in the North Sea, Gulf of Mexico, off the Canadian east coast and the west coast of Africa throughout the nineties. It was also involved in the removal of one platform, the Esso Odin. During the late nineties Saipem planned an upgrade to the vessels DP system and installation of a J-Lay system.

=== Recent projects ===
The Saipem 7000 has completed 4 J-Lay pipe projects Diana, Blue Stream, Ormen Lange and Medgaz, but its main work continues to be heavy lift in the North Sea and the Gulf of Mexico. This includes both platform installation and removal and the addition of modules to existing platforms.

It is currently deployed in the North Sea, approximately 27km east of Montrose, Scotland, installing the 114 jacket foundations for Seagreen offshore wind farm.

=== Incident in Norway ===
On 14 April 2022, the vessel suffered a lifting accident in a Norwegian fjord near Stavanger during a planned load test of the cranes. The main block wire broke, dropping a barge used as test weight. This caused the vessel to tilt, but was soon stabilized. Nobody was injured during the incident.

=== Incident in Rotterdam ===
In February 2024, while due to undergo repair work, Saipem 7000 had a fatal allision with a small vessel in the Port of Rotterdam. The Incident Report from the Dutch Safety Board stated that Rotterdam's pilots and the ship repair yard should carry out better planning before navigational evolutions in confined harbours.

=== Lifting and pipelaying records ===
The Saipem 7000 set the world offshore lifting record of 12,150 tons for the Sabratha deck in the Mediterranean Sea. A local record for the Gulf of Mexico (Mexican area) was set with the 10,473 tons of the PB-KU-A2 deck. In July 2010, the Saipem 7000 broke another world record by lifting the new BP Valhall Production and Hotel topside of approximately 11,600 tonnes on Dynamic Positioning. The previous world record set at Sabratha was performed on the vessel's anchoring system. The first and third records were broken on 7 September 2019 when the Sleipnir lifted the 15,300 ton deck module for Noble's Leviathan.

The Saipem 7000 laid the 24" pipeline for the Blue Stream project between Russia and Turkey up to the record depth of 2,150 meters in the Black Sea. This was broken at the end of 2005 by the Balder which laid a pipeline in 2,200 meters of water, yet Balder was outbeat herself in 2014 by another laybarge of Saipem, the FDS2, which laid another 24" pipeline in 2,250 meters offshore Brazil.

== Description ==
=== Concept ===
The Saipem 7000, originally named the Micoperi 7000, was conceived in the mid-1980s by its original owners Micoperi as a multipurpose offshore oil platform installation vessel that would be able to install very large oil production platform decks (known as integrated decks) as well as the decks' supporting structures (known as jackets) using its two very large fully revolving cranes. It would also be able to support the offshore completion of the platform by providing hotel and workshop facilities for large construction crews. Saturation diving facilities would support subsea connection work. The vessel's size and semi-submersible form would allow it to operate in worse weather conditions than smaller and conventionally shaped vessels.

The huge cost of a vessel of this size would be offset by the cost and time savings made by the oil company as the large integrated decks could be completed, tested and commissioned onshore. Prior to the introduction of the large crane vessels, offshore oil platforms were made up of 1000 - 2000 tonne modules which were lifted into place individually by smaller SSCVs or monohull crane vessels and then connected together offshore, tested and then commissioned; this often took over a year. Other savings in the installation of the jackets could also be made.

=== Original specification ===
==== Heavy lift ====
The Saipem 7000 has two NOV Lifting and Handling AmClyde model Saipem 7000 fully revolving cranes. Each has a 140-metre-long boom fitted with 4 hooks. Each crane is capable of lifting up to 7,000 tonnes at 40 m lift radius using the main hook. The auxiliary hook capacities are 1st Auxiliary 2,500 tonnes at 75 m radius and 2nd Auxiliary 900 tonnes at 115 m. The whip hook has a capacity of 120 tonnes at 150 m. The 2nd Auxiliary hook can be deployed to a water depth of 450 m. The two cranes are capable of a tandem lift of 14,000 tonnes.

Each crane was fitted with 15,600 hp (11,630 kW) engines to power the boom and load hoists, 9 tugger lines and the crane slewing system. The cranes use 48 miles (77 km) of wire rope of various diameters.

==== Ballast system ====
The Saipem 7000 was fitted with two ballast systems: a conventional pumped system which could transfer up to 24,000 tonnes of water per hour using 4 pumps and a free flooding system. The free flooding system used 2 m diameter valves to open certain compartments to the sea thus trimming or heeling the vessel. This allows the vessel to lift cargoes from barges much faster than if just the crane hoists are used.

==== Power system ====
The vessel's main power is provided by eight 12-cylinder 8400 hp diesel engines built by Grandi Motori Trieste, a former Fincantieri company. Later Grandi Motori was purchased by the Finnish Wärtsilä. They provide up to 47,000 kW of electric power at 10,000 V 60 Hz for propulsion and positioning. Auxiliary power is provided by two 6-cylinder 4,200 hp (3,130 kW) GMT diesel engines. There is also an emergency generator.

Total power that can be supplied is 57,000 kilowatts (76,000 hp).

==== Mooring system ====
The vessel was supplied with 16 anchor lines, 4 at each corner. Each line consists of 3350 m of 96 mm wire rope, 50 m of 92 mm chain and a 40-tonne Norshore Mark 3 anchor. Each line has its own 1,350 kilowatts (1,810 hp) single drum winch. The mooring system can be used in water depths of up to 450 m.

The Saipem 7000 is also equipped with two anchor windlasses equipped with 550m of 130mm chain and 35 tonne anchor.

==== Thrusters ====
The vessel was fitted with 12 thrusters—6 on each hull. They are, per hull:

- 1 No. 2,500 kilowatts (3,400 hp) bow thrusters in athwartship tunnels
- 2 No. 3,500 kilowatts (4,700 hp) azimuthing retractable thrusters under the hull
- 2 No. 4,500 kilowatts (6,000 hp) azimuthing thrusters at the stern—these are used when transiting
- 1 No. 5,500 kilowatts (7,400 hp) azimuthing retractable thrusters under the hull (added during 1999 refit)

==== Dynamic positioning system ====
The vessel is equipped with a dynamic positioning system which uses either the thrusters or the mooring system or a combination of both, controlled by a number of computers, to hold the vessel in a predefined location.

==== Platform installation equipment ====
- Two Menck MHU 3000 hydraulic hammers capable of 3000 kJ impact energy.
- Two Menck MHU 1700 hydraulic hammers.
- Two Menck MHU 1000 hydraulic hammers.
- Two Menck MHU 600 hydraulic hammers.
- One Menck MHU 220 hydraulic hammer.
- One Menck MHU 195 hydraulic hammer.
- Two underwater power packs.
- One hydraulic hammer compensator.
- Various Menck steam hammers and their associated boilers
- Sixteen 35 cm diameter 60 m long cable laid slings
- A containerized 14-man saturation diving system which can be moved to any of the vessel's three moon pools
- Two leveling systems, range 66" - 72" diameter; 900 tonne capacity each.
- Two external levelling systems; 1000 tonnes each.
- Abandonment/Recovery system with double capstan winch, 2000 tonne capacity each.

==== Handling deck equipment ====
- One Kobelco Crawler Crane 70 tonnes capacity
- One Hydraulic Tyred Crane 35 tonnes capacity
- Two Fork Lifts 5 tonnes capacity each

==== Accommodation ====
The accommodation designed for 800 people contains 30 triple cabins, 335 double cabins, 35 singles and 5 suites. The accommodation also contains a large galley and mess rooms, a hospital, cinema and lounges.

=== 1999 vessel re-fit ===
During the winter of 1999/2000 the Saipem 7000 underwent a refit to enhance its positioning and power systems and add a J-lay system.

The power system was upgraded to provide up to 70,000 kW using 12 diesel generators. To improve the vessel's resilience the generators are distributed between four separate engine rooms.

Two 5,500 kW retractable azimuthing thrusters were added, one below the forward part of each hull. The DP system control computers were also replaced.

The hull, deck and deck structures were modified to accept the Gusto designed J-lay tower and its support equipment. The J-lay tower can lay pipe from 4" to 32" diameter with a tension of up to 525 tonnes (5.15 MN) using the tensioners and up to 2,000 tonnes (20 MN) when using friction clamps. The deck can be used to store up to 10,000 tonnes of pipe.

To allow space for the increased equipment some items from the original specification were removed, including 2 anchor winches from the bow, all the moon pools, and the boilers used to provide steam for the steam hammers.
