= Benguela-Belize Lobito-Tomboco Platform =

Angolian offshore oil platform

Coordinates: 5.4167°S 11.2167°E

Benguela-Belize Lobito-Tomboco is a 512 m (1,680 ft) offshore compliant tower oil platform off the coast of Angola, located in water 390 m (1,280 ft) deep in the lower Congo Basin. It is owned and run by the Chevron Corporation.
