= Pompano Platform =

Oil platform

Pompano is a 477 metres (1,565 ft) offshore oil platform in the Gulf of Mexico. The platform was formerly owned and run by BP Exploration but sold to Stone Energy in early 2012.

== See also ==
- Offshore oil and gas in the US Gulf of Mexico
