= German corvette Braunschweig =

Braunschweig-class corvette

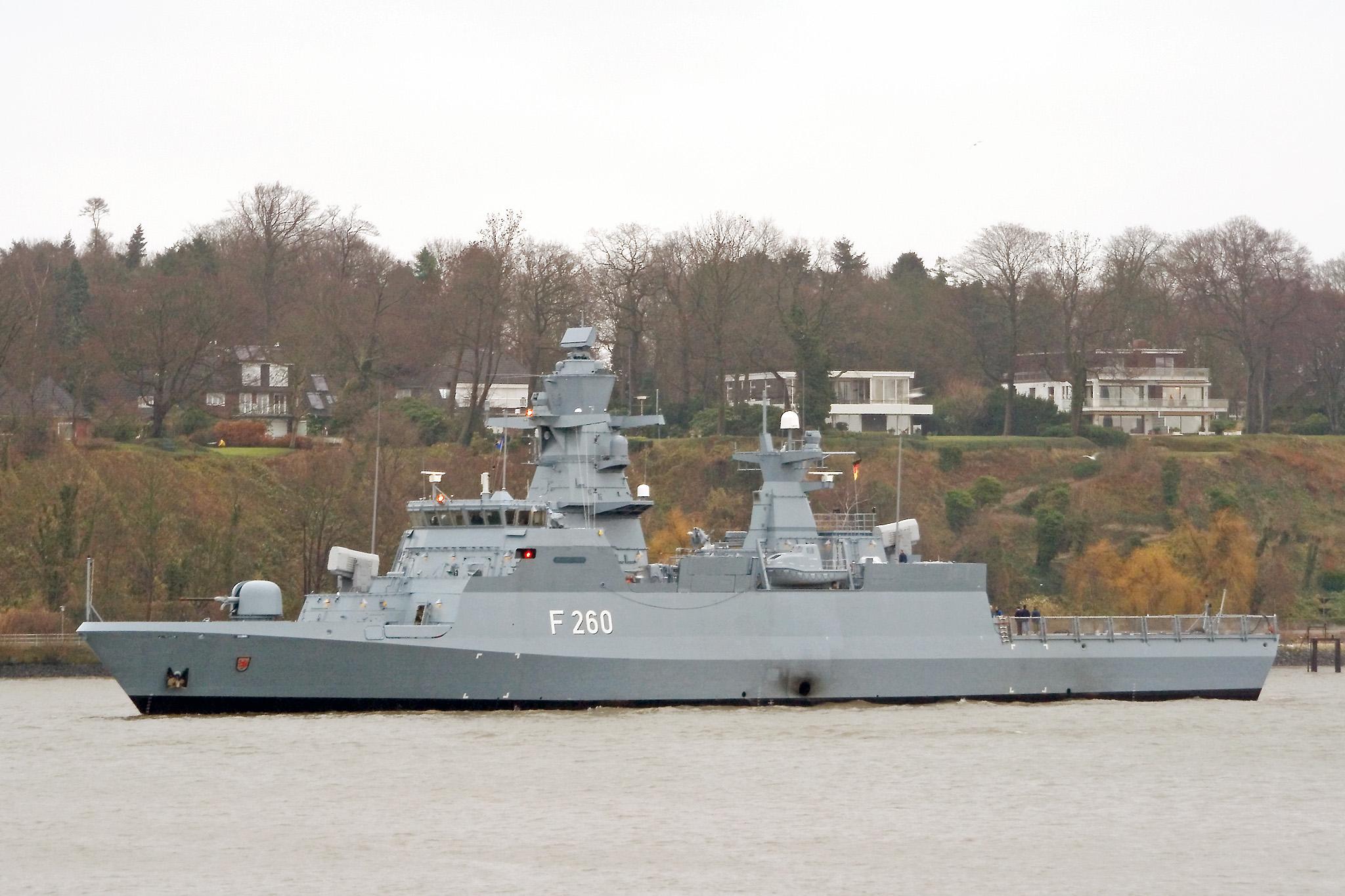
- Braunschweig sails from Hamburg, Germany on 11 December 2006 for her first voyage.

History

Germany
- Name: Braunschweig
- Namesake: Braunschweig
- Port of registry: Hamburg, Germany
- Ordered: December 2001
- Builder: Blohm+Voss, Hamburg
- Cost: €240 million
- Laid down: 3 December 2004
- Launched: 19 April 2006
- Commissioned: 16 April 2008
- Home port: Wilhelmshaven, Germany
- Identification: MMSI number: 211910000; Callsign: DRBA; Pennant number: F260
- Status: Active

General characteristics
- Type: Braunschweig-class corvette
- Displacement: 1,840 tonnes (1,810 long tons)
- Length: 89.12 m (292 ft 5 in)
- Beam: 13.28 m (43 ft 7 in)
- Draft: 3.4 m (11 ft 2 in)
- Propulsion: 2 MTU 20V 1163 TB 93 diesel engines producing 14.8MW, driving two controllable-pitch propellers.
- Speed: 26 knots (48 km/h; 30 mph)
- Range: 4,000 nmi (7,400 km) at 15 kn (28 km/h; 17 mph)
- Endurance: 7 days; 21 days with tender
- Complement: 65 : 1 commander, 10 officers, 16 chief petty officers, 38 enlisted
- Sensors & processing systems: Cassidian TRS-3D multifunction Passive electronically scanned array C-Band radar; 2 navigation radars; MSSR 2000 i IFF system; MIRADOR electro-optical sensors; UL 5000 K ESM suite; Link 11 and Link 16 communications
- Electronic warfare & decoys: 2 × TKWA/MASS (Multi Ammunition Softkill System) decoy launcher; UL 5000 K ECM suite
- Armament: Guns; 1 × OTO Melara 76 mm gun; 2 × Mauser BK-27 autocannons; Anti-ship; 4 × RBS-15 Mk.3 anti-ship missiles; Close-In Weapon System: 2 × RAM Block II launchers, 21 missiles each; Mine laying capability; 2 mine racks of 34 naval mines Mk 12
- Aircraft carried: Helicopter pad and hangar for two UMS Skeldar V-200

Braunschweig (F260) is the lead ship of the Braunschweig-class corvette of the German Navy.

== Development ==
The K130 Braunschweig class (sometimes Korvette 130) is Germany's newest class of ocean-going corvettes. Five ships have replaced the Gepard-class fast attack craft of the German Navy.

The ships feature reduced radar and infrared signatures ("stealth" beyond the Sachsen-class frigates) and will be equipped with two helicopter UAVs for remote sensing. The German Navy ordered a first batch of two UMS Skeldar V-200 systems for the use on the Braunschweig-class corvettes. The hangar is too small for standard helicopters, but the pad is large enough for the Sea King, Lynx, and NH-90 helicopters operated by the German Navy.

The German Navy has ordered the RBS-15 Mk4 anti-ship missiles in advance, which will be a future development of the Mk3 with increased range —400 km (250 mi)— and a dual seeker for increased resistance to electronic countermeasures. The RBS-15 Mk3 has the capability to engage land targets.

In October 2016 the German Government announced that a second batch of five frigates is to be procured from 2022–2025. The decision was in response to NATO requirements expecting Germany to provide a total of four corvettes at the highest readiness level for littoral operations by 2018, and with only five corvettes just two can be provided.

== Construction ==
Braunschweig was laid down on 3 December 2004 and launched on 19 April 2006 in Hamburg. She was commissioned on 16 April 2008.

== Operation ==
Braunschweig and the Indonesian corvette KRI Bung Tomo conducted a joint exercise, as part of UNIFIL, on 24 June 2017.

On 19 August 2020, Braunschweig served as a platform for shipborne trials of two UMS Skeldar V-200 UAVs.

On 16 August 2024, she was towed up the Thames in London, and moored alongside HMS Belfast. On 19 August 2024, Braunschweig played the Imperial March as she was towed out of London.

== Bibliography ==
- Warship International Staff (2007). "First of the German K 130 Class". Warship International. XLIV (4): 364–365. ISSN 0043-0374.
