= Asian Hercules II =

Crane vessel

History

Singapore
- Name: Asian Hercules II
- Operator: Asian Lift Pte Ltd (Keppel FELS/SMIT JV)
- Completed: 1997
- In service: 1997–present
- Home port: Singapore
- Identification: IMO number: 8639297; MMSI number: 563793000
- Status: In service

General characteristics
- Class & type: ABS A1 (E) Barge + PAS
- Tonnage: 10,560 GT 3,168 NT
- Length: 91 metres (299 ft)
- Beam: 43 metres (141 ft)
- Draft: 2.75 to 8.50 metres (9 ft 0 in to 27 ft 11 in)
- Installed power: 3× Diesel generator, 1,940 kilowatts (2,600 hp) total output
- Propulsion: 4 x 813 kW Azimuth
- Speed: 7 kilotonnes (6,900 long tons; 7,700 short tons)

Asian Hercules II is a floating sheerleg crane vessel owned and operated by Asian Lift (Smit Singapore and Keppel Fels).

== History ==
She was built in 1997 in Singapore at Keppel's Far East-Levingston Shipbuilding Ltd's yard. Soon after completion, Asian Hercules II was loaned to Smit International and served the European lifting market from 1999.

Asian Hercules II set the completed Gateshead Millennium Bridge in place on 20 November 2000.

Asian Hercules II and Rambiz lifted sections of the sunken Tricolor from the English Channel after it sank in 2002. Tricolor was cut into sections with a carbide-coated cable prior to wreck removal.

In 2011, Asian Hercules II set the heavy-lift mast crane for Seven Borealis.
