= Gateshead Millennium Bridge =

English tilt bridge across the River Tyne

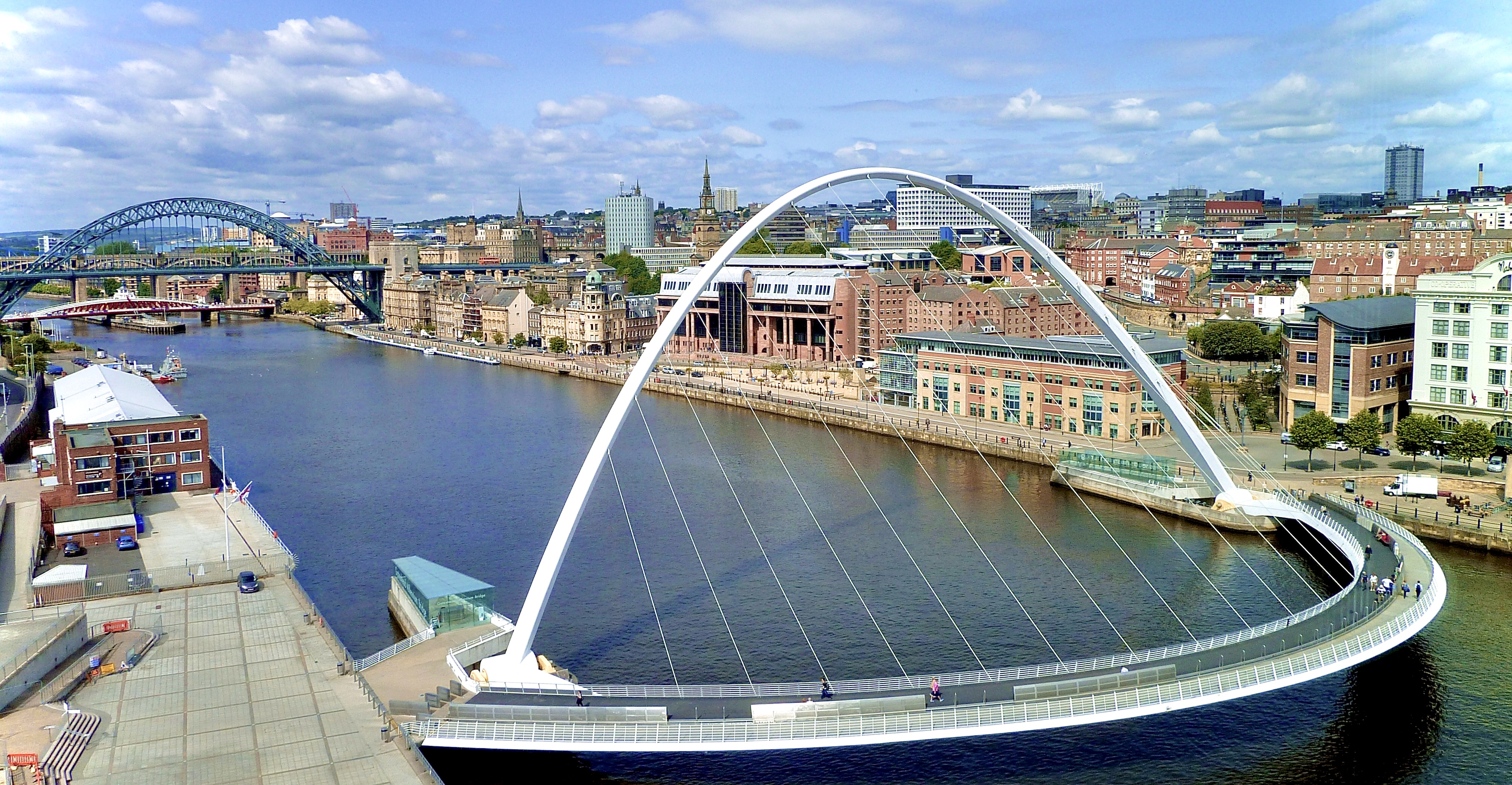
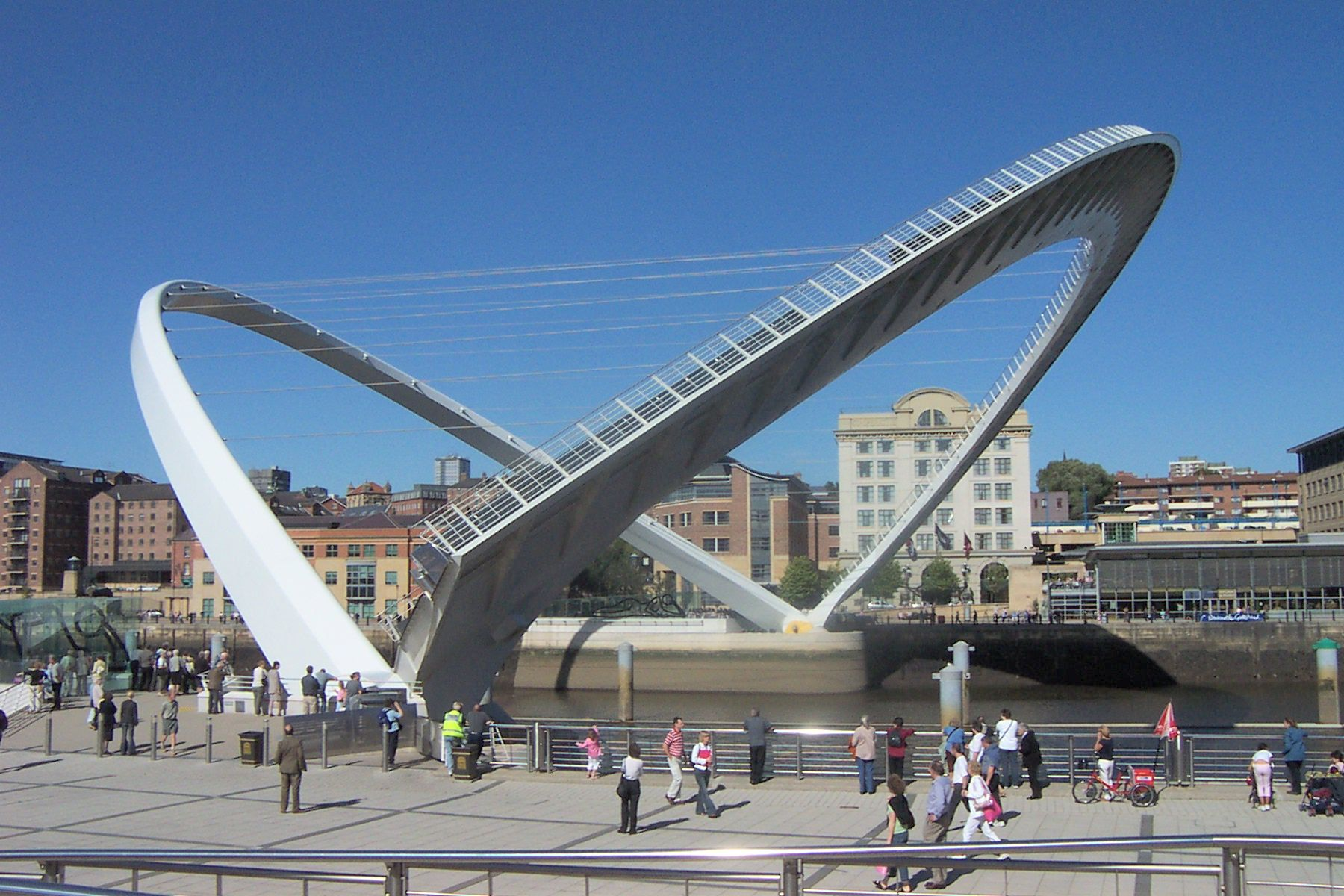
- Above: Gateshead Millennium Bridge, looking west along the River Tyne, as viewed from the Gateshead side Below: Gateshead Millennium Bridge when tilted, also viewed from the Gateshead side
- Coordinates: 54.9698°N 1.5992°W
- OS grid reference: NZ256639
- Carries: Cyclists; Pedestrians
- Crosses: River Tyne
- Locale: Tyneside
- Official name: Gateshead Millennium Bridge
- Other names: The Blinking Eye Bridge; The Winking Eye Bridge
- Owner: Gateshead Council
- Website: www.gateshead.gov.uk/article/4594/Gateshead-Millennium-Bridge
- Preceded by: Tyne Bridge
- Followed by: Tyne Pedestrian and Cyclist Tunnels

Characteristics
- Design: Tilt bridge
- Material: Steel
- Pier construction: Concrete
- Total length: 126 m (413 ft)
- Width: 8 m (26 ft)
- Longest span: 105 m (344 ft)

History
- Architect: WilkinsonEyre
- Engineering design by: Gifford
- Constructed by: Volker Stevin
- Fabrication by: Watson Steel
- Construction end: 28 June 2001
- Construction cost: £22 million
- Opened: 17 September 2001
- Inaugurated: 7 May 2002; by Queen Elizabeth II

Location
- Interactive map of Gateshead Millennium Bridge

The Gateshead Millennium Bridge is a pedestrian and cyclist tilt bridge spanning the River Tyne between Gateshead arts quarter on the south bank and Newcastle upon Tyne's Quayside area on the north bank. It was the first tilting bridge ever to be constructed. Opened for public use in 2001, the award-winning structure was conceived and designed by architectural practice WilkinsonEyre and structural engineering firm Gifford. The bridge is sometimes called the 'Blinking Eye Bridge' or the 'Winking Eye Bridge' due to its shape and its tilting method. The Millennium Bridge stands as the twentieth tallest structure in the city, and is shorter in stature than the neighbouring Tyne Bridge.

== History ==
=== Historical context ===
Gateshead Millennium Bridge is part of a long history of bridges built across the River Tyne, the earliest of which was constructed in the Middle Ages. As quay-based industries grew during the Industrial Revolution and Victorian era due to its accessible port, the area became more prosperous. However, industry declined along the River Tyne following World War II and the quay deteriorated into the 1980s. This prompted regeneration activities in both Newcastle and Gateshead, beginning with the construction of Newcastle Law Courts on the riverbank. In 1995, Gateshead Council devised plans to develop a new contemporary arts centre, the Baltic Centre for Contemporary Art, and the need for a footbridge to link the two cities became more apparent.

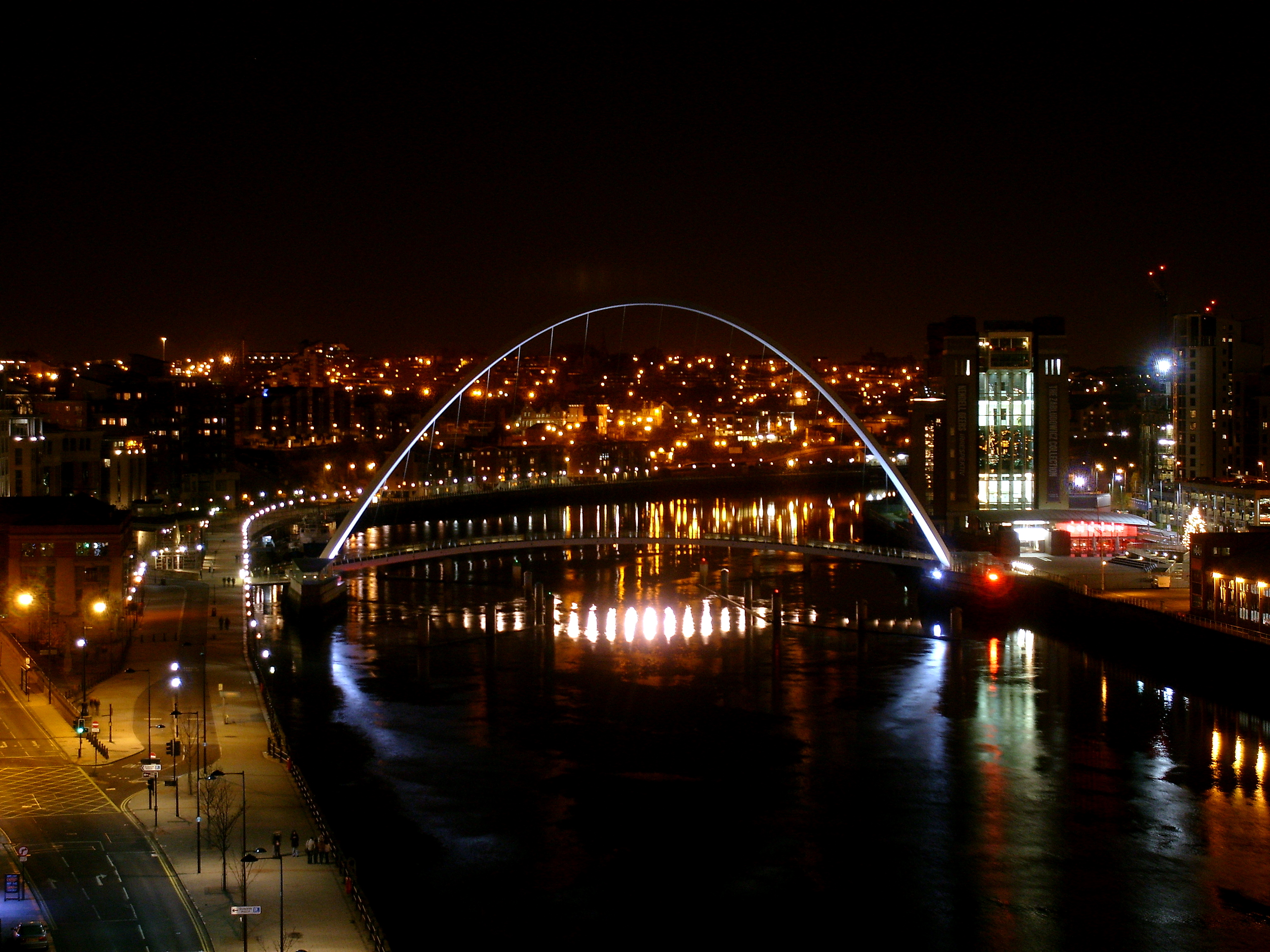
The construction of Gateshead Millennium Bridge provided a link between wider regeneration projects in Newcastle (left) and Gateshead (right).

=== Conception ===
A competition was held by Gateshead Council in 1996 to design a new bridge to link Gateshead to Newcastle, the first opening bridge to be built on the River Tyne in over 100 years. The bridge would form part of the regeneration on both sides of the River Tyne, providing a crossing between new commercial buildings and housing built in Newcastle and cultural and leisure developments in Gateshead. It would also facilitate a 1-mile (1.6 km) circular promenade around the Quayside. Although river-based traffic had decreased by the 21st century, the cities of Gateshead and Newcastle still intended to retain the image of the River Tyne as a working river. The advert for the competition was published in the New Civil Engineer magazine with the brief "We are looking for design teams who can create a stunning, but practical, river level crossing which fits this historic setting, opens for shipping and is good enough to win Millennium Commission funding." There were over 150 entries and Gateshead residents voted for their favourite out of a shortlist of six architectural teams. WilkinsonEyre and Gifford and Partners claimed the prize in February 1997 with Gateshead Councillor Mick Henry remarking that the design was "something very special."

By July 1997, a final design was under preparation for submission to the Millennium Commission in order to secure funding. The bridge, which is the world's first tilting bridge, ultimately cost £22 million, with funding from the Millennium Commission, the European Regional Development Fund, English Partnerships, East Gateshead Single Regeneration Budget, and Gateshead Council. By this point, the name of the bridge was still undecided. The original proposed name of 'Baltic Millennium Bridge' (in reference to the adjacent Baltic Centre for Contemporary Art on the Gateshead side) was objected to by Newcastle City Council. In response, Gateshead Council decided upon the final name of 'Gateshead Millennium Bridge' in 1998, which caused an ongoing feud between the two councils.

=== Opening ===
Gateshead Council originally announced that the bridge would be open in September 2000, but it was not completed until September the following year. The first tilt took place on 28 June 2001 to 36,000 onlookers. It was opened to the public on 17 September 2001 to a crowd of thousands. The barrier lifted at 2 pm to allow the first public crossing, and the first people to cross received a commemorative medal gift from the Council. The bridge was dedicated by Queen Elizabeth II on 7 May 2002, during her Golden Jubilee tour. A commemorative plaque unveiled by the Queen reads: "Gateshead Millennium Bridge. Opened by Her Majesty The Queen on 7th May 2002." Before a formal dinner at the Baltic Centre for Contemporary Art, the Queen said "Today I see the tangible signs of the determination of all those within this region to create a new future. There have been so many personal acts of kindness, especially over the last two months, now I have the chance to express my gratitude to the people of the North East."

== Structure ==
=== Design ===
Animation demonstrating how a tilt bridge operates to either let pedestrians cross or allow water traffic to pass underneath

Gateshead Millennium Bridge was constructed to fulfil the following main design constraints: the bridge must be 4.5 metres (15 ft) above river-level during high spring tides when closed; nothing must be built on the Gateshead Quayside; the deck must have no more than a 1:20 slope to allow disabled access. The bridge consists of two steel arches – a deck which acts as the pedestrian and cycle path, and a supporting arch. The bridge was designed to be as light as possible to allow for easy opening and closing, so the two arches are lighter towards the centre span than at the hinges. The pedestrian and cycle deck is a parabolic shape with a 2.7 metres (8.9 ft) vertical camber. It is divided into two separate paths on different levels for the different modes of transport, separated by a stainless steel "hedge" with seating areas and steps interspersed throughout. The supporting arch is also a parabola, designed in such a way as to match the shape of the Tyne Bridge upstream. The two arches are joined together by 18 suspension cables which provide stability for people crossing the bridge.

Six hydraulic rams (three on each side) tilt the entire 850,000 kg bridge as a single structure, meaning that when the supporting arch lowers, the pedestrian deck rises to create 25 metres (82 ft) of clearance for river traffic to pass underneath. The bridge takes around four minutes to rotate through the full 40° from closed to open, moving as fast as 18 mm (0.71 inches) per second. The design is so energy-efficient that, in April 2017, it cost just £3.96 per opening. The appearance of the bridge during this manoeuvre has led to it being nicknamed the "Blinking Eye Bridge", and has solidified its reputation as being not only a functional piece of infrastructure but a spectacle in and of itself. The rotation of the bridge is also used as a self-cleaning mechanism, as rubbish collected on the deck rolls towards traps built at each end.

A lighting system designed by Jonathan Spiers and Associates is used at night to attractively illuminate the bridge without causing light pollution, as the cables are too thin to be visible or reflect light at night. The lights shine white during the week and a variety of colours over the weekend. Green and red LEDs are used during the day to alert cyclists and pedestrians to the bridge's opening and closing.

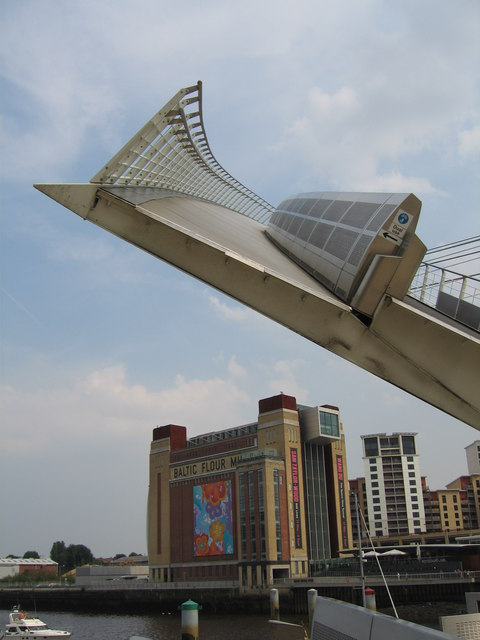
Close-up of the pedestrian and cycle arch while the bridge is tilting.

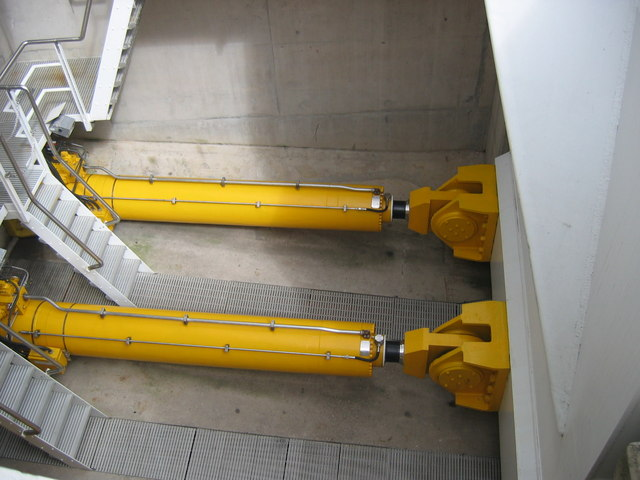
The hydraulic rams allow the bridge to fully tilt open in around 4 minutes.

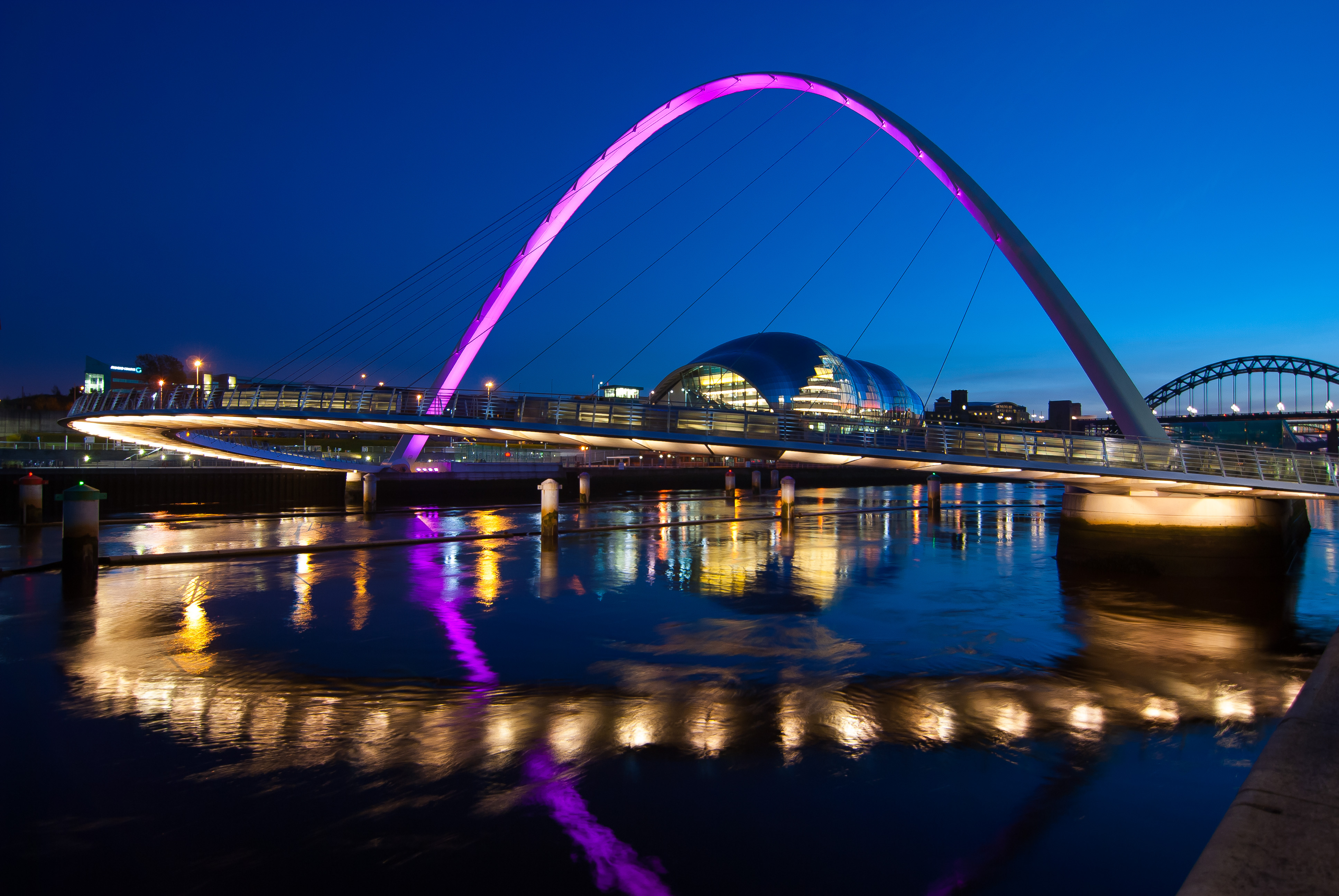
Gateshead Millennium Bridge lit purple at dusk. The lights on the bridge vary in colour over the weekend.

=== Construction and installation ===
Gateshead Council selected Gateshead-based Harbour & General as the main contractor for the construction of the bridge. Harbour and General then selected over 12 sub-contractors to cover elements of construction including control systems, metalwork, lighting, and piling and river work. Consulting engineering group Ramboll provided further engineering, construction, and contract management services. The bridge's structure was modelled in LUSAS using 3D elements. LUSAS modelling allowed a model of the bridge to be built and allowed analysis of buckling forces, wind, and temperature. Another software – Pertmaster Professional – was used for risk and project management and cost analysis.

Watson Steel was appointed as the specialist contractor to prefabricate the bridge, and they subcontracted the design of the hydraulic system to Kvaerner Markham. The pre-fabricated sections of the bridge were shot-blasted and painted in Hadrian's Yard, 6.5 km (4.0 miles) from the bridge's final position. The entire structure was assembled by first welding together the nine arch sections and deck sections, and then attaching the cables to the arch and deck. Protective paintwork (Interzone 505 and Interthane 990 from International Protective Coatings) was applied to the arch before it was erected.

The bridge was lifted into place in one piece by the Asian Hercules II, one of the world's largest floating cranes, on 20 November 2000. Whilst being transported by the crane, the bridge was rotated 90° in order to navigate narrow bends along the river. It was successfully slotted into threaded bolts in the piers with only 3 mm (0.1 inches) of tolerance. Handrails, seating, and the hydraulic systems were installed after the bridge was in place. The transportation of the bridge took only one day and was a spectacle, attracting crowds of onlookers.

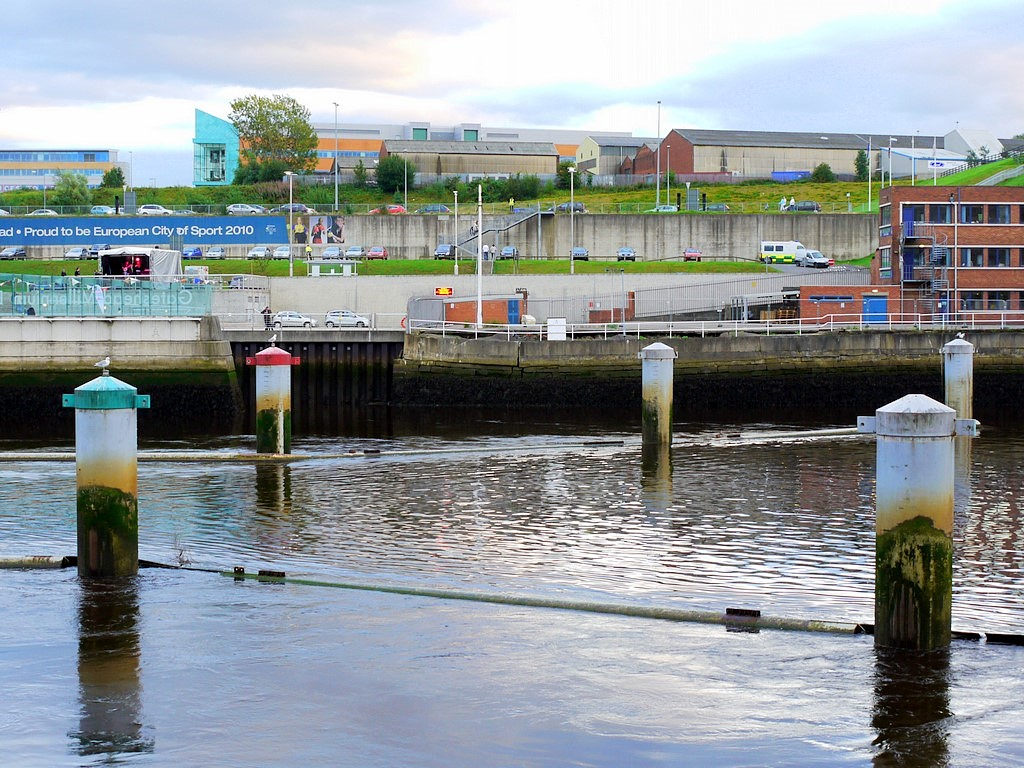
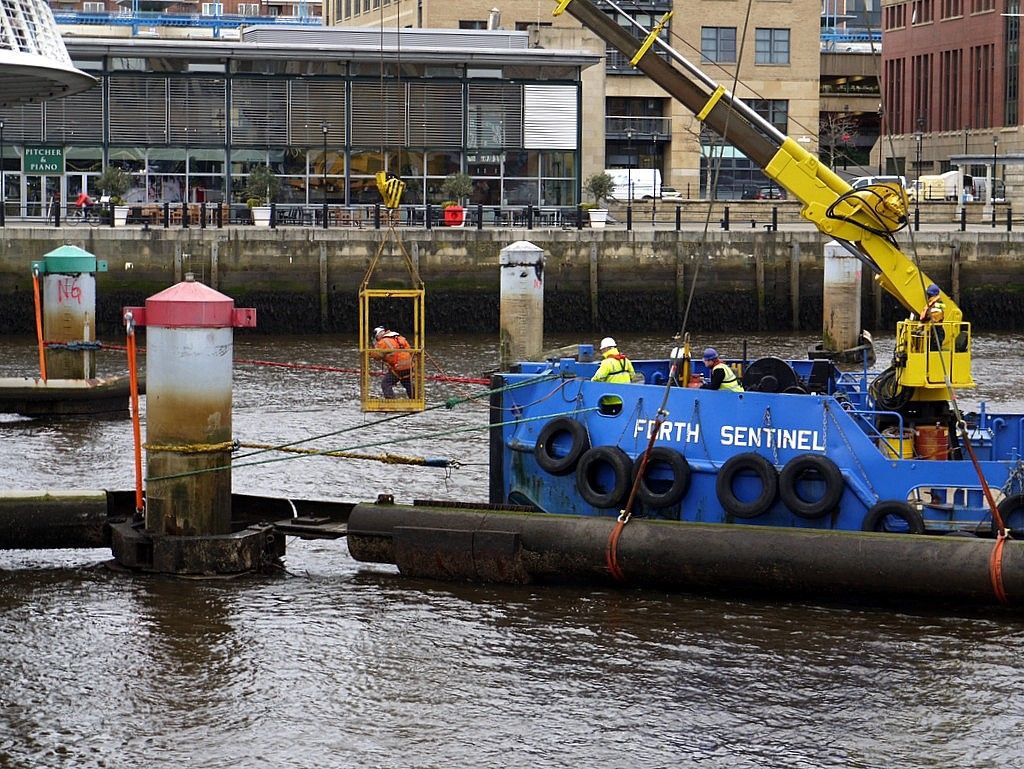
The piles under Gateshead Millennium Bridge (left) were removed in 2012 (right).

The Port of Tyne Authority required the design of the bridge to incorporate a vessel collision protection system. As a result, two rows of parallel fixed piles, splaying out diagonally on each side of the bridge, were installed. However, it became clear to members of the construction project team and WilkinsonEyre that they were unsightly and undermined "the finesse of the bridge". Between February and June 2000, the unsightly nature of the piles also caught the attention of the public, with multiple news articles and letters expressing discontent. Complaints pointed out that the Millennium Bridge in London did not have similar piles, and that a Newcastle University boat race had to be moved specifically to avoid potential collision with the piles. Over time, Gateshead Council and the Harbourmaster noted that the piles were not required and they were removed in 2012 by BAM Nuttall Limited. This decision was ultimately less expensive than maintaining them.

== Regional and cultural significance ==
The bridge depicted on a (rare) 2007 British one pound coin

Gateshead Millennium Bridge has retained its status as a significant local landmark and tourist attraction, not only built to develop the local area but also to establish local pride. It is one of several cultural landmarks on Gateshead Quays, including Baltic Centre for Contemporary Art and Sage Gateshead. It opens periodically for sightseers and for major events such as The Boat Race of the North and the Cutty Sark Tall Ships' Race. The bridge also lights up to mark celebrations or dedications. For example, it was lit blue on 4 July 2020 as part of the 'Light it Blue' campaign celebrating the 72nd anniversary of the NHS and its contributions during the COVID-19 pandemic. It was also lit green in April 2020 in recognition of social care workers.

The bridge has been featured in film and on TV including the BBC TV drama 55 Degrees North and the British 2005 film Goal!. On 17 July 2005, Spencer Tunick used the bridge in an art installation: 1,700 people gathered together nude and were photographed around the Millennium and Tyne Bridges and the Baltic Centre for Contemporary Art. The bridge was pictured on a first-class stamp in 2000, and a pound coin depicting the bridge was produced by the Royal Mint in 2007.

=== Awards ===
Gateshead Millennium Bridge has won a total of 25 awards for design and lighting. For the construction of the bridge, the architect WilkinsonEyre won the 2002 Royal Institute of British Architects (RIBA) Stirling Prize. This was a somewhat controversial decision; although the RIBA judges described the bridge as a "truly heroic piece of engineering and construction", there was debate among the attendees of the awards ceremony as to whether it also counted as architecture, with some claiming that it was not a building. However, Jim Eyre of WilkinsonEyre argued that the feat did cross over into the boundary of architecture. WilkinsonEyre and Gifford also won the 2003 IStructE Supreme Award. The bridge was awarded the British Constructional Steelwork Association's Structural Steel Design Award in 2002. In 2005, the bridge received the Outstanding Structure Award from the International Association for Bridge and Structural Engineering.

| Next crossing upstream | River Tyne | Next crossing downstream |
| Tyne Bridge; A167 and 725 | Gateshead Millennium Bridge; Grid reference NZ256639 | Tyne Pedestrian & Cycle Tunnel |
