= LUSAS =

- Developer(s): LUSAS
- Stable release: 20.0-4 / 12 July 2023
- Operating system: Windows
- Type: Finite Element Analysis Simulation
- License: Proprietary
- Website: www.lusas.com

LUSAS is a UK-based developer and supplier of Finite Element Analysis (FEA) application software products that bear the same name.

== History ==
LUSAS has its origins back in 1970 when a group of research workers at the University of London (now incorporated into Imperial College London) began work on the London University Stress Analysis System, "LUSAS". This team was led by Dr. Paul Lyons, who, in 1982, set up an independent company, Finite Element Analysis Ltd., to further develop, and subsequently market the software as a general purpose structural analysis system. In 1997, following the introduction of a range of specialist application software packages, the company, for awareness reasons, then started to trade under the LUSAS name.

== Software ==
LUSAS software consists of a Windows-based Modeller, used for model building and viewing of results, and a Solver for carrying out an analysis. Four commercial application products cater for the following industries:

- Civil & Structural - for civil, structural, nuclear, seismic, geotechnical and offshore engineering.
- Bridge - for bridge engineering analysis, design, and assessment.
- Analyst - for automotive, aerospace, defence, manufacturing and general engineering analysis.
- Composite - for engineers designing composite products or components.

For Universities, an Academic version which permits the running of any commercial LUSAS software product can be used for teaching and research use.

== Example Applications ==
Civil and structural engineering uses include Anthony Gormley's Quantum Cloud, built alongside the Millennium Dome, (now the O2 Arena), as part of UK's Millennium Commission sponsored celebrations for the year 2000; Spinnaker Tower, the tallest publicly accessible provincial structure in the UK; and Gwangmyeong Velodrome, the largest domed structure built, so far, in South Korea.

Bridges designed with the aid of LUSAS include the Lune Millennium Bridge, and the Gateshead Millennium Bridge both also built, coincidentally, as part of the UK's year 2000 celebrations, and the Vasco da Gama cable stayed bridge and associated viaduct structures in Portugal.

General mechanical engineering uses are extremely varied and include thermal analysis of marine loading arms - used to transfer Liquid Natural Gas (LNG) from shore to ship and vice versa at a temperature of -163 degrees Celsius, nonlinear analysis of nylon polyamide cable ties used to bundle cables together, and contact analysis of titanium and ceramic hip joint components as used in artificial hip replacement

Composites engineering applications involve the analysis of composite material layups for potential delamination, material damage and fatigue modelling of many types of components in the automotive, aviation, and marine industries.
