= Hermod (ship) =

Semi submersile crane vessel

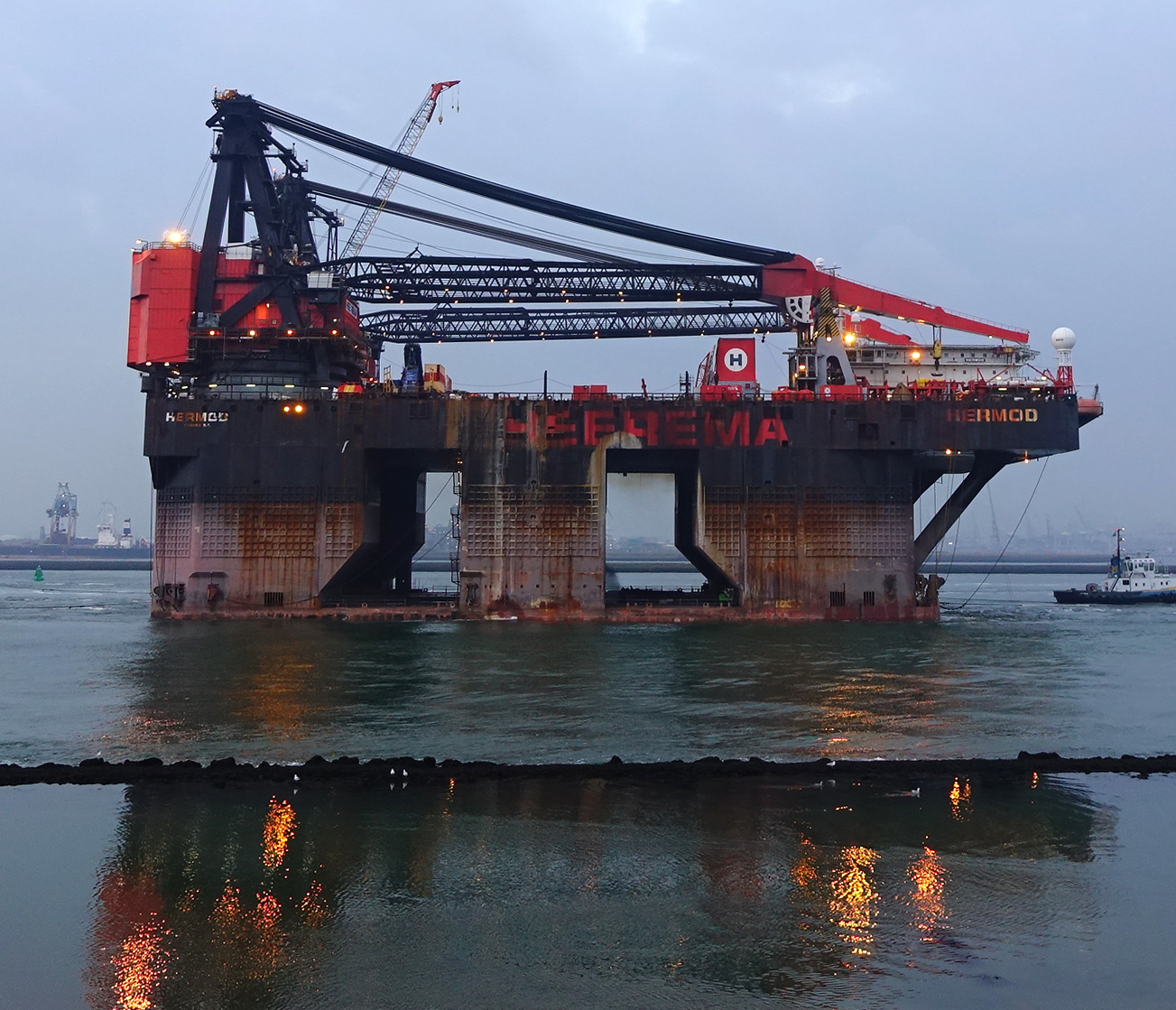
- Hermod in Rotterdam (2014)

History
- Name: Hermod
- Namesake: Hermóðr (figure in Norse mythology)
- Operator: Heerema Marine Contractors
- Builder: Mitsui Engineering & Shipbuilding
- Completed: 1979
- Decommissioned: 2017
- Identification: IMO number: 7710214; MMSI Number: 356707000; Callsign: H3IA
- Fate: Scrapped

General characteristics
- Class & type: semi-submersible crane vessel
- Tonnage: 73,877 GRT; 22,166 NT
- Length: LOA 154 m (505 ft)
- Beam: 86 m (282 ft 2 in)
- Draft: 11.5 to 28.2 m (38 to 93 ft)
- Depth: 42 m (138 ft)
- Installed power: 7 × diesel generators of 2,765 kW each.
- Propulsion: 2 × controllable pitch propellers; 2 × forward thrusters
- Speed: 6 knots (11 km/h; 6.9 mph) loaded at 11.5 m (38 ft) draft
- Complement: 336 berths

SSCV Hermod was a semi-submersible crane vessel operated by Heerema Marine Contractors.

== History ==
Semi submersible crane vessel (SSCV) Hermod was constructed in 1979 by Mitsui Engineering & Shipbuilding Co., Ltd. Hermod and sister vessel, Balder were the world's first semi-submersible crane vessels. In the early 1980s these vessels set several lift records while operating in the North Sea.

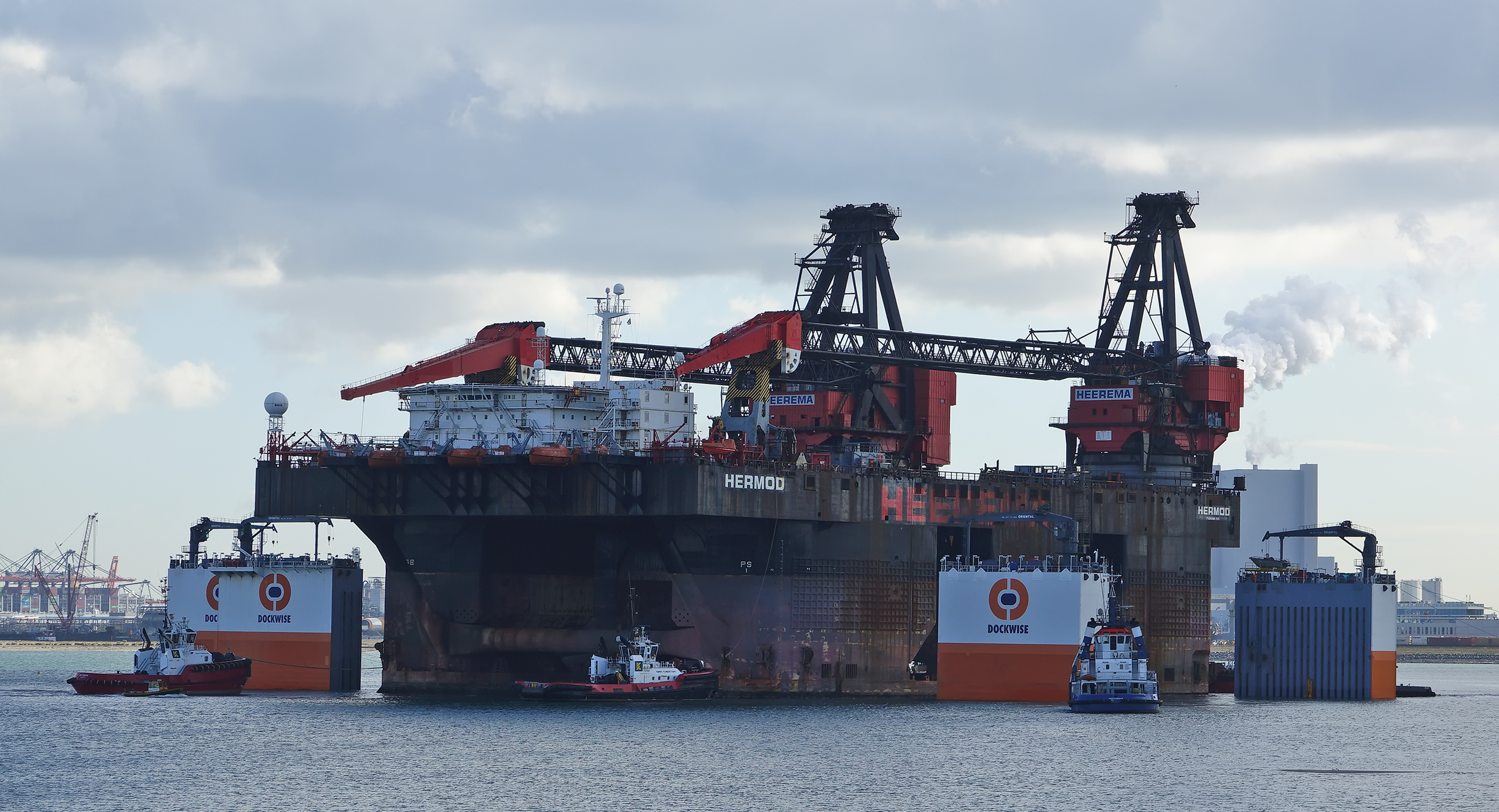
Hermod being loaded on Dockwise Vanguard for transport to scrapyard, 15 September 2017

Hermod was retired at the end of 2017. She was loaded on Dockwise Vanguard and taken to Dinghai District, Zhejiang province for scrapping at Zhoushan Changhong International Ship Recycling. 98% of the ship's materials will be reused.

== Design ==
The hull consisted of two floaters with three columns each. The transit draught of 12 meters was normally ballasted down to 25 meters for lifting operations; at that load, the floaters (with a draught of 12 meters) were well-submerged, reducing the effect of waves and swell.

Propulsion was by two controllable pitch propellers and two forward, retractable, controllable pitch thrusters. The helicopter deck was capable of sustaining a Sikorsky 61-N. Up to 336 people could be supported in the air conditioned living quarters.

=== Cranes ===
The Hermod had two cranes at the stern. Originally the starboard-side crane was rated at 3,000 short tons (2,700 t) and the port-side at 2,000 short tons (1,800 t). In 1984, the lifting capacities were upgraded to 5,000 and 4,000 short tons (4,500 and 3,600 t) respectively. The main hoist could lift 92 m (302 ft) above the work deck. The auxiliary hoists could lower to a depth of 3,000 metres (9,800 ft) below the work deck. A tandem lift using the main hoists could lift 9,000 short tons (8,200 t) at a 39 m (128 ft) radius.
