= Heerema Marine Contractors =

Crane vessel operator based in the Netherlands

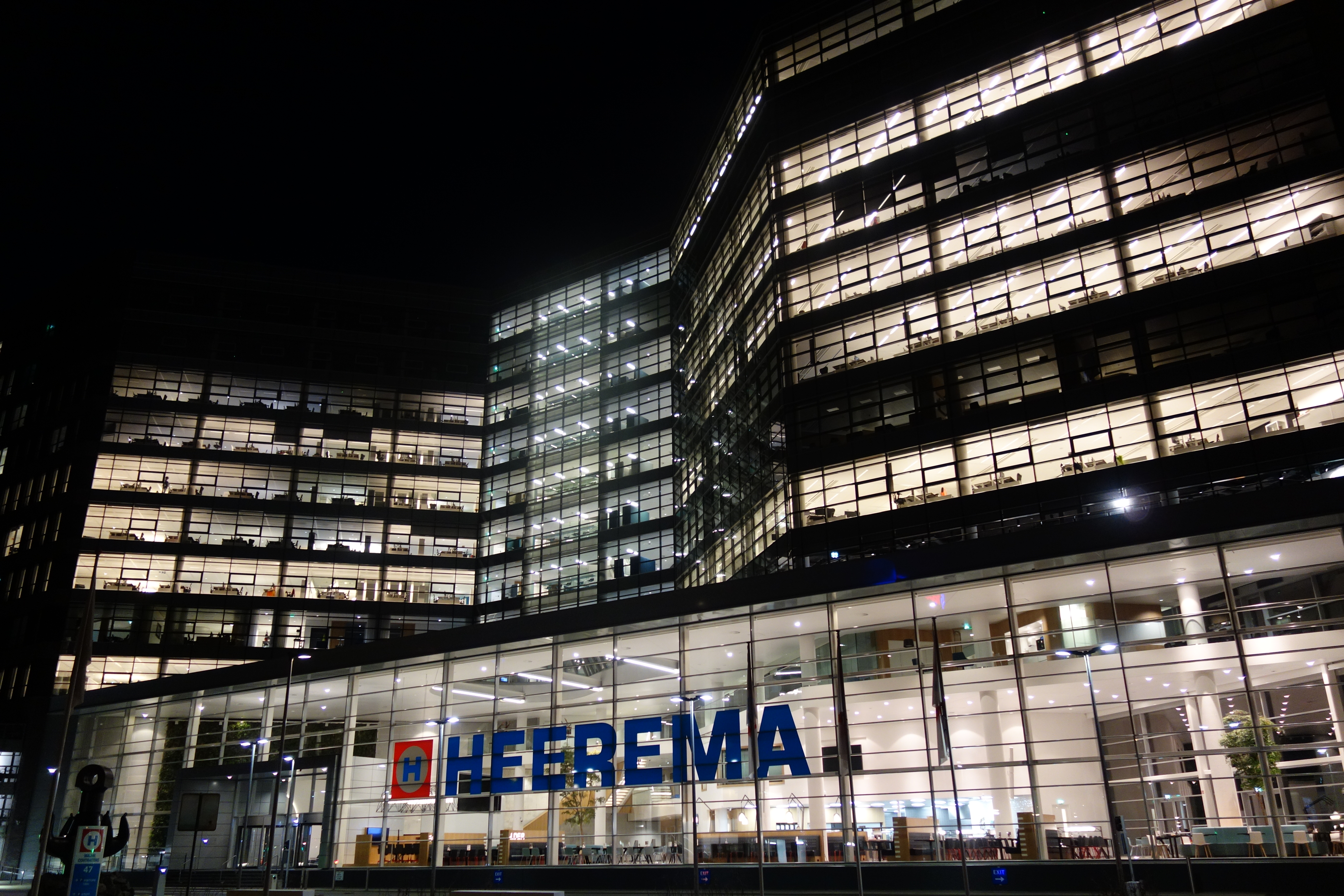
- The current headquarters in Leiden, Netherlands
- Company type: Private
- Industry: Independent contractor; Offshore construction; Offshore engineering
- Founded: 1948
- Founder: Pieter Schelte Heerema
- Headquarters: Vondellaan 47, Leiden, Netherlands
- Key people: Marcel de Nooijer (CEO since 2026); Robbert Sloos (CFO) since 2022); Michel Hendriks (COO) since 2022); Jeroen van Oosten (CCO since 2022))
- Parent: Heerema International Group Services SA
- Website: https://hmc.heerema.com/

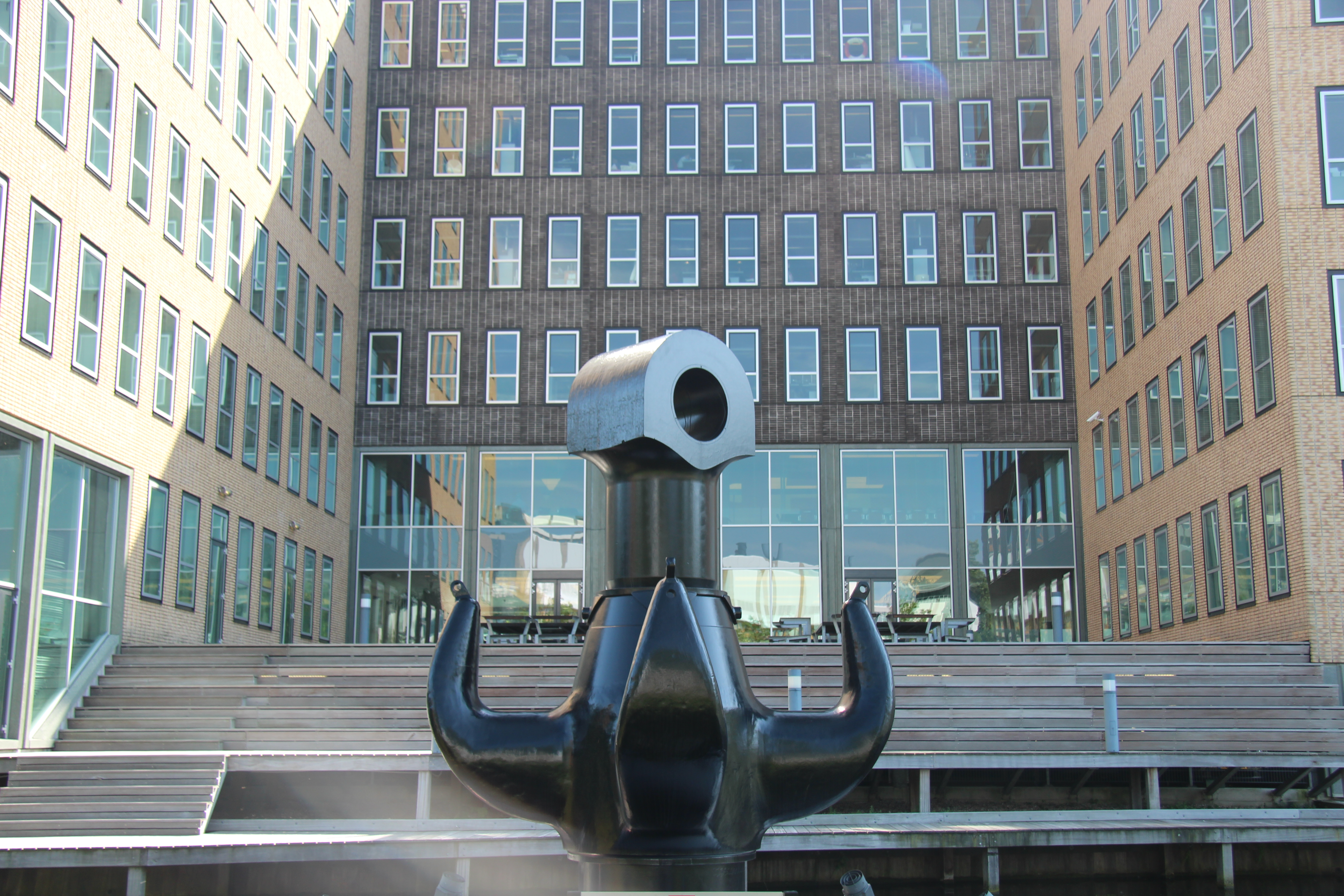
Former Heerema building (Leiden)

Heerema Marine Contractors (HMC) is a contractor headquartered in the Netherlands most notable for operation of three of the largest crane vessels in the offshore industry.

== History ==
Heerema Marine Contractors was formed in 1948 by Pieter Schelte Heerema as a small construction company providing oilfield platforms in Venezuela.

In the 1960s the company focused on the North Sea offshore developments. The company developed crane vessels to lift large offshore platforms and modules. The ship shaped crane vessel Challenger was equipped to lift 800 t.

The need for large stable crane vessels to operate in the North Sea environment lead the company to develop the first large semi-submersible crane vessels. In 1978, HMC commissioned Mitsui to construct the two sister semi-submersible crane vessels, DCV Balder and SSCV Hermod. These vessels could lift 5,400 tonnes with the twin cranes, and were later upgraded to 8,200 tonnes.

In 1988 HMC formed a joint venture with McDermott called HeereMac.

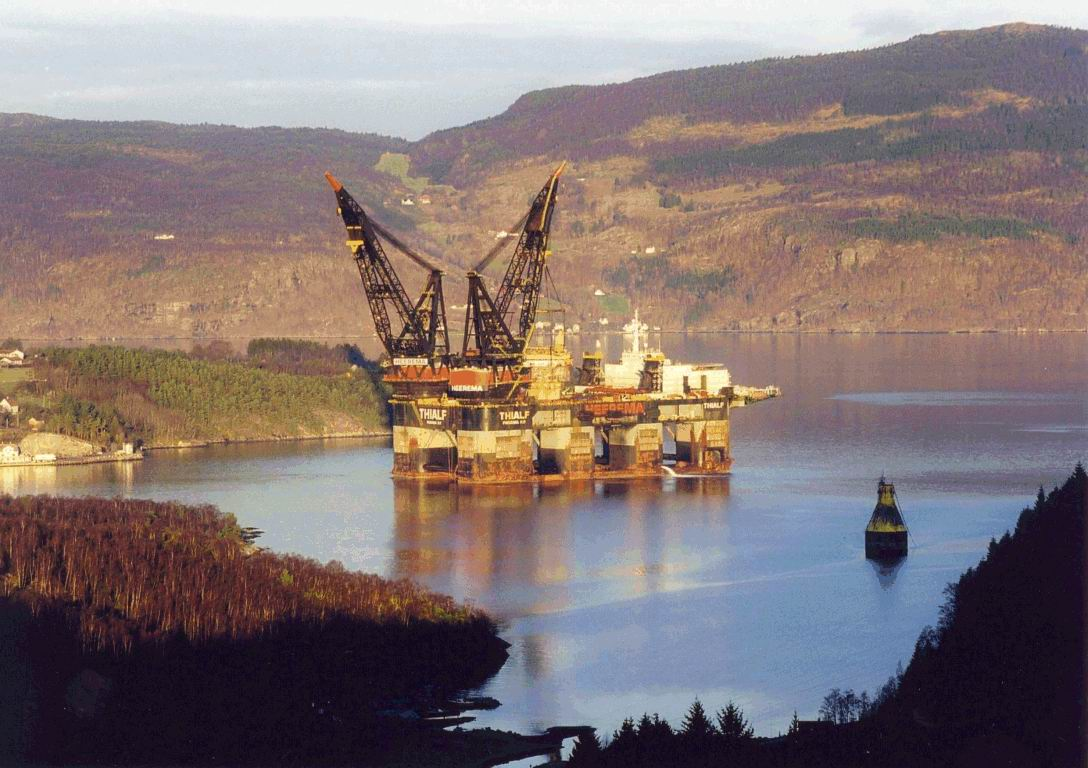
"Thialf" in a Norway fjord

The SSCV Thialf was added to the HeereMac fleet, and upon the split of the companies in December 1997, Heerema took ownership of the Thialf, the largest deep water construction vessel and is capable of a tandem lift of 14,200 t (15,600 short tons)

The DCV Balder was affected by a flooding incident in 2006 and was put out of service for a few months.

== Vessels ==
Heerema presently owns and operates the following crane vessels:

- DCV Balder
- DCV Aegir
- SSCV Thialf
- SSCV Hermod - Decommissioned late 2017
- SSCV Sleipnir
- Kolga tug
- Bylgia tug

Plus a number of barges.

== Significant installations ==
- Bullwinkle
- Perdido
- Thunder Horse PDQ
- Peregrino
- Kaombo
