= DCV Balder =

Deepwater construction vessel built in 1978

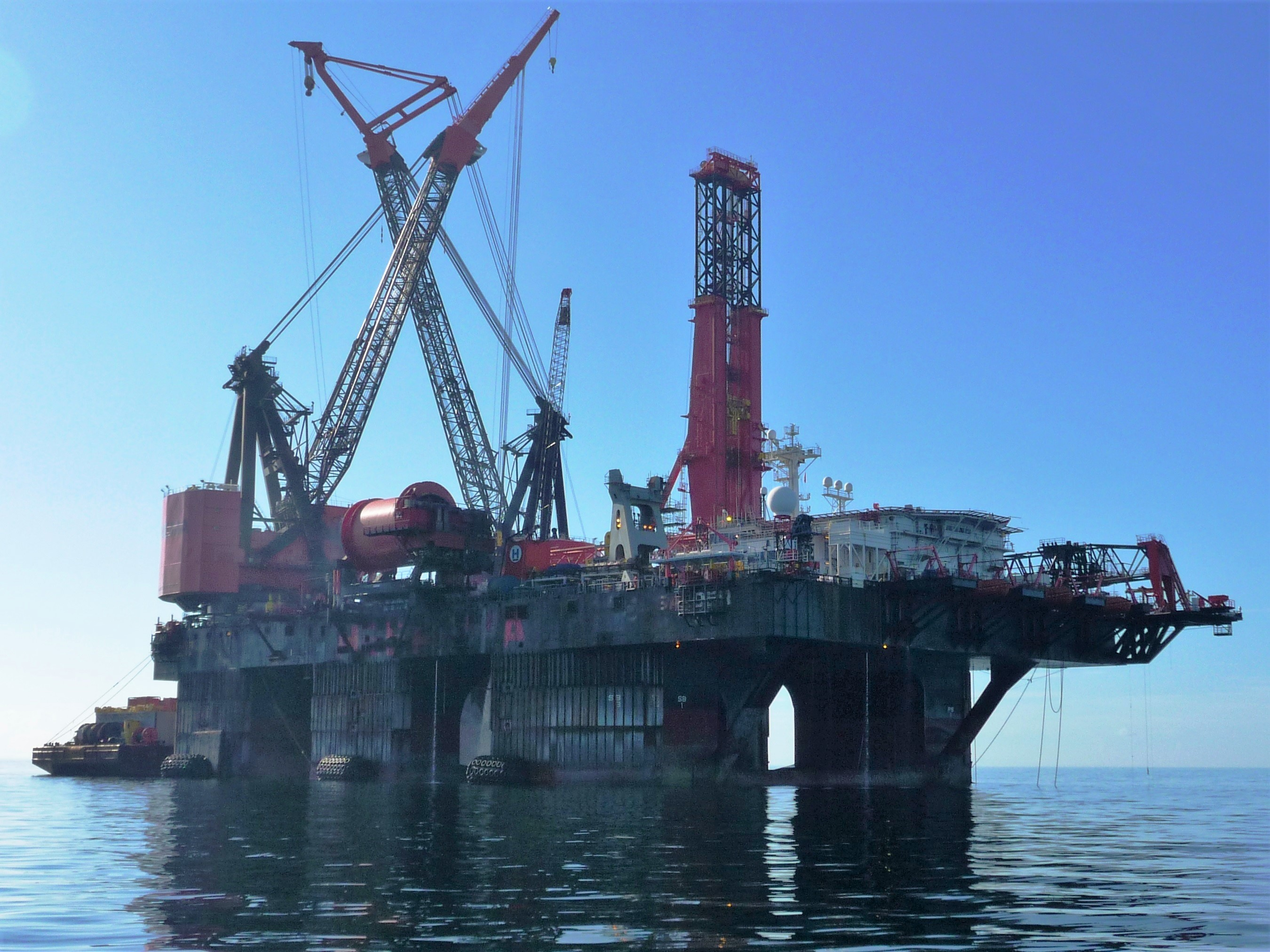

History
- Name: Balder
- Namesake: Baldr (god in Norse mythology)
- Operator: Heerema Marine Contractors
- Port of registry: Panama City, Panama
- Builder: Mitsui Engineering & Shipbuilding; conversion to a DCV by Verolme Botlek
- Completed: 1978
- Identification: Call sign 3EWK; IMO number: 7710226; MMSI number: 354721000
- Status: In service

General characteristics
- Class & type: Deepwater Construction Vessel
- Tonnage: 75,374 GT
- Displacement: 104,355 tonnes
- Length: 154 m (505 ft 3 in)
- Beam: 86 m (282 ft 2 in) (118 m incl. J-Lay)
- Height: 101 m (331 ft) (J-Lay tower to workdeck)
- Draft: 27 m (88 ft 7 in) max
- Depth: 42 m (137 ft 10 in)
- Propulsion: 7 × 3,500 kW azimuth thrusters and two propellers.
- Complement: 350 berths

DCV Balder is a deepwater construction vessel (DCV) operated by Heerema Marine Contractors.

== History ==
The Balder was constructed in 1978 as semi-submersible crane vessel by Mitsui Engineering & Shipbuilding Co., Ltd. Balder and sister vessel, Hermod were the world's first semi-submersible crane vessels. In the early 1980s these vessels set several lift records while operating in the North Sea. Conversion to a DCV was carried out in 2001 by Verolme Botlek BV in the Netherlands.

== Design ==
The hull consists of two floaters with three columns each. The transit draught of 12 meters is normally ballasted down to 25 meters for lifting operations, with the floaters (with a draught of 12 meters) well-submerged, reducing the effect of waves and swell.

It is powered by seven 3,500 kW azimuth thrusters and two propellers. There is accommodation for 350 persons. Lightship weight is 49,631 tonnes.

In the 2001 conversion, it was fitted with seven thrusters and a J-lay system. The 98 m J-Lay tower, designed and constructed by Huisman Itrec, is capable of laying pipe in water depths to 3,000 m (10,000 ft). Balder was also equipped with class III dynamic positioning system and a mooring line deployment winch. The winch is the largest in the world, with a diameter of 10.5 meters and a safe working load (SWL) of 275 t.

=== Cranes ===
The Balder has two cranes (3600 t, 2700 t). Originally the starboard-side crane was rated at 3000 short ton and the port-side at 2000 short ton. In 1984, the lifting capacities were upgraded to 4000 and 3000 short tons respectively in a fixed mode (and 3300 & 2200 in revolving mode). To accommodate the J-Lay tower, the port crane jib was converted to a fly jib in 2001.

== Remarkable projects ==
- In 1978 Occidental’s Piper Alpha was the first platform installation with a Semi Submersible Crane Vessel. It was a British platform that blew out and burned to the water, killing 167 of its crew.
- In 2005 the world's largest semi-submersible platform, BP's Thunder Horse, was installed. Later in the year, Balder assisted in righting Thunder Horse, found listing dramatically after Hurricane Dennis.
- In 2006 it installed BP’s Mardi Gras Atlantis gas export pipeline (0.6 m / 24 in diameter) in a record breaking water depth of 2220 meters (7217 feet).
- in 2007 it moored the Independence Hub Facility in a record breaking water depth of 2438 m (8000 ft), with a world record for the deepest flow line installation of 2743 m (9000 ft).
