= Floating sheerleg =

Floating water vessel with a crane built on shear legs

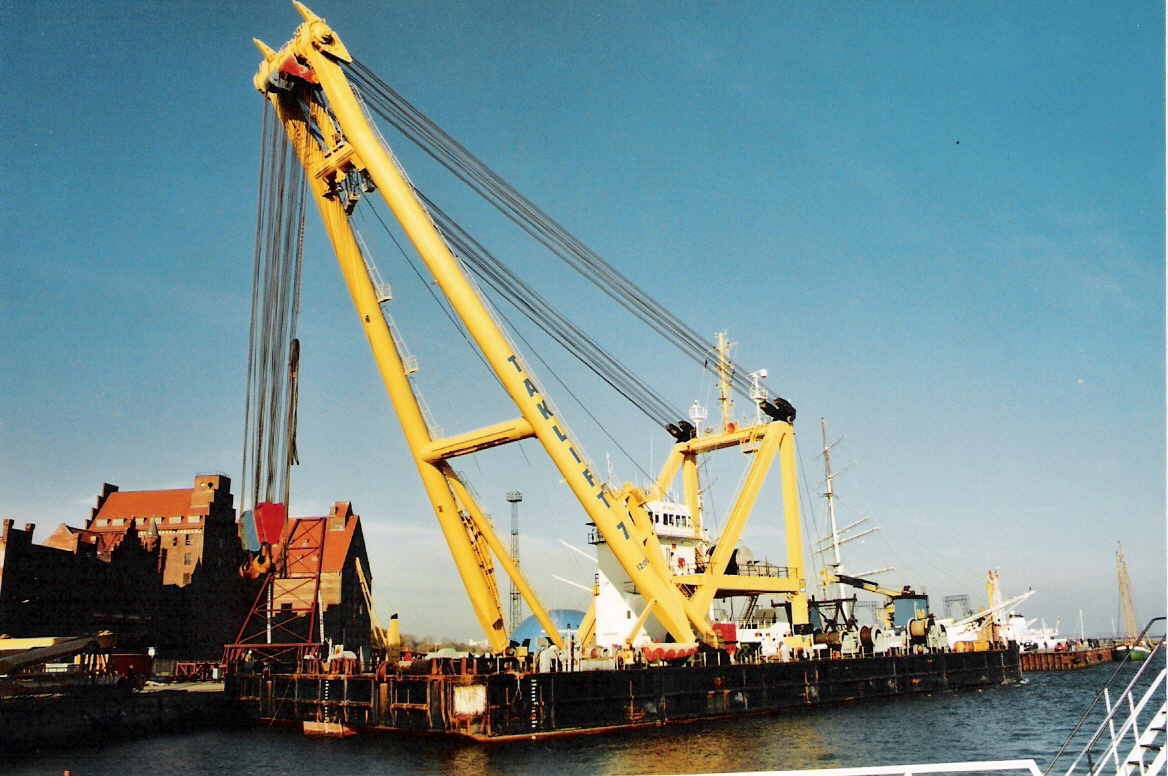
1600 ton maximum lift capacity sheerleg Taklift 7 of Smit International

A floating sheerleg (also: shearleg) is a floating water vessel with a crane built on shear legs. Unlike other types of crane vessel, it is not capable of rotating its crane independently of its hull.

There is a huge variety in sheerleg capacity. The smaller cranes start at around 50 tons in lifting capacity, with the largest being able to lift 20,000 tons. The bigger sheerlegs usually have their own propulsion system and have a large accommodation facility on board, while smaller units are floating pontoons that need to be towed to their workplace by tugboats.

Sheerlegs are commonly used for salvaging ships, assistance in shipbuilding, loading and unloading large cargo into ships, and bridge building. They have grown considerably larger over the last decades due to a marked increase in vessel, cargo, and component size (of ships, offshore oil rigs, and other large fabrications), resulting in heavier lifts both during construction and in salvage operations.

== List of floating sheerlegs by lifting capacity ==
Name	Image	Company	Lifting capacity	Country
Pioneering Spirit		Allseas	20,000 t 22,000 short tons	Switzerland
Hyundai-10000		Hyundai Heavy Industries	10,000 t 11,000 short tons	Korea
Asian Hercules III		Asian Lift (Smit & Keppel FELS)	5,300 t 5,800 short tons	Singapore
HL 5000		Deep Offshore Technology	5,000 t 5,500 short tons	Iran
海翔 Kaisho		Yorigami Maritime Construction Co., Ltd.	4,100 t 4,500 short tons	Japan
Gulliver		Scaldis	4,000 t 4,400 short tons	Luxemburg
洋翔 Yousho		Yorigami Maritime Construction Co., Ltd.	4,000 t 4,400 short tons	Japan
第50吉田号 Yoshida No. 50		Yoshida-Gumi Co., Ltd.	3,700 t 4,100 short tons	Japan
武蔵 Musashi		Fukada Salvage	3,700 t 4,100 short tons	Japan
L-3601		Sembcorp Marine	3,600 t 4,000 short tons	Singapore
Rambiz		Scaldis	3,300 t 3,600 short tons	Belgium
Asian Hercules II		Asian Lift (Smit & Keppel FELS)	3,200 t 3,500 short tons	Singapore
富士 Fuji		Fukada Salvage	3,000 t 3,300 short tons	Japan
SADAF 3000		Darya Fan Qeshm Industries (SADAF)	3,000 t 3,300 short tons	Iran
第28吉田号 Yoshida No. 28		Yoshida-Gumi Co., Ltd.	3,000 t 3,300 short tons	Japan
HEBO-Lift 10 (former Taklift 4)		HEBO Martitiemservice B.V.	2,200 t 2,400 short tons (Note: 1,600 t (1,800 short tons) as delivered in 1981. Capacity upgraded in 2010.)	Netherlands
駿河 Suruga		Fukada Salvage	2,200 t 2,400 short tons	Japan
SB Pelicano		Superbraço Serviços Marítimos Ltda	2,050 t 2,260 short tons	Brazil
金剛 Kongo		Fukada Salvage	2,050 t 2,260 short tons	Japan
Matador 3		Bonn & Mees	1,800 t 2,000 short tons	Netherlands
Left Coast Lifter		Tappan Zee Constructors	1,699 t 1,873 short tons	United States
Asian Hercules		Asian Lift (Smit & Keppel FELS)	1,600 t 1,800 short tons	Singapore
PW L-1501		Pacific Workboats Pte Ltd	1,500 t 1,700 short tons	Singapore
Lifter 1		Saipem	1400 ton	Malta
新建隆 Shin-kenryu		Yorigami Maritime Construction Co., Ltd.	1,400 t 1,500 short tons	Japan
新柏鵬 Shin-hakuho		Yorigami Maritime Construction Co	1,300 t 1,400 short tons	Japan
Taklift 6 (Note: Sold to Turkey for scrap in 2017)		Asian Lift (Smit & Keppel FELS)	1,200 t 1,300 short tons	Singapore
Taklift 7		Smit Internationale	1,200 t 1,300 short tons	Netherlands
BGL1		Superbraço Serviços Marítimos Ltda	1,000 t 1,100 short tons	Brazil
Italia		Fratelli Neri	1,000 t 1,100 short tons	Italy
Smit Cyclone		Asian Lift (Smit & Keppel FELS)	1,000 t 1,100 short tons	Bahamas
Chesapeake 1000		Donjon Marine	910 t 1,000 short tons	United States
HEBO Lift 9 (Note: ex-Samson)			900 t 990 short tons	Denmark
Brabo		Antwerp Port Authority	800 t 880 short tons	Belgium
Zahariy LR-800		Kuznia na rubalskomu ship building	800-850t 900 short tons	Ukraine
Taklift 1		Smit Internationale	800 t 880 short tons	Netherlands
PW L-801		Pacific Workboats Pte Ltd	800 t 880 short tons	Singapore
Uglen		J. J. Ugland	800 t 880 short tons	Norway
伊豆 Izu		Fukada Salvage	700 t 770 short tons	Japan
大和 Yamato		Fukada Salvage	700 t 770 short tons	Japan
宏栄号 Koei-go		Fukada Salvage	600 t 660 short tons	Japan
Enak		LÜHRS Schifffahrt GmbH & Co. KG (Note: Acquired from Bugsier Reederei und Bergungs GmbH & Co KG)	600 t 660 short tons	Germany
Cormorant		Multraship Towage and Salvage B.V.	600 t	Netherlands
RMG 500		Resolve Salvage & Fire	500 t 550 short tons	Singapore
SBG Himmat		Arihant Ship Breakers	450 t 500 short tons	India
Norma		Scaldis	440 t 490 short tons	Belgium
Asian Helping Hand III		Asian Lift (Smit & Keppel FELS)	400 t 440 short tons	Singapore
Consul		Tenwolde Transport en Repair	400 t 440 short tons	Netherlands
Tronds Lift 7		Tronds Marine	400 t 440 short tons	Norway
Tronds Lift 8		Tronds Marine	400 t 440 short tons	Norway
Matador		Bonn & Mees	400 t 440 short tons	Netherlands
Matador 2		Bonn & Mees	400 t 440 short tons	Netherlands
Smit Typhoon		Asian Lift (Smit & Keppel FELS)	400 t 440 short tons	Bahamas
SAMSON		Crofton Diving Corporation, Inc.	350 short tons	United States
HEBO-Lift 7		HEBO Maritiemservice B.V.	300 t 330 short tons	Netherlands
Floating Crane No. 303		Fukada Salvage	300 t 330 short tons	Japan
Triton		Wagenborg Towage	300 t 330 short tons	Netherlands / Germany
Cábrea Pará		Superbraço Serviços Marítimos Ltda	250 t 275 short tons	Brazil
