= EMAS (company) =

- Type: Public (SGX: 5DN )
- Industry: Petroleum Oil & Gas
- Founded: 1992 (31 years ago)
- Headquarters: Singapore, Oslo, Houston
- Area served: Worldwide
- Key people: Mr Lionel Lee (Managing Director), Mr Koh Poh Tiong (Non-Executive Chairman)
- Products: Offshore engineering and construction
- Revenue: US$984.2 million (2012)
- Net income: US$186.2 million (2012)
- Number of employees: 5,500 (January 2012)
- Website: www.emas.com www.ezraholdings.com

EMAS is an offshore contractor and integrated offshore solutions provider catering to the oil and gas (O&G) industry on a global scale. It operates as a subsidiary of Ezra Holdings and has gained recognition within the industry. Established in 1992, the company is headquartered in Singapore and initially focused its operations in the maritime sector of the Asia Pacific region, primarily managing a fleet of vessels. In 2003, the company successfully listed its shares on the Singapore Exchange SGX, enhancing its market presence. EMAS also established fabrication facilities in Vietnam.

In response to the changing demands of the industry, EMAS established a construction and production division. In 2007, its subsidiary, EOC Limited, was successfully listed on the Oslo Stock Exchange OSE, specializing in offshore services. EMAS later launched an energy division which offered a range of onshore drilling, offshore drilling, and well services. EMAS's secured a strategic acquisition of Aker Marine Contractors, a group specializing in subsea construction and installation technologies, in 2011.

EMAS was promoted to Mainboard on 8 December 2005.

== History ==
EMAS was founded in 1992 by Mr. Lee Kian Soo. Headquartered in Singapore, EMAS is now an offshore service provider, with offices in 16 locations across 5 continents.

- 1992 Founded. Incorporated EMAS Offshore to provide management and operation of offshore support vessels.
- 2003 Launch of Initial Public Offering (IPO) in Singapore
- 2005 Acquisition of Vietnam Fabrication Yard, Asian Technical Maritime Services Ltd (ATMS) through wholly owned subsidiary HCM Logistics Limited & Promoted to SGX Main Board
- 2007 Buys strategic stake of 21.83% for S$16.5m in SGX-listed Nylect Technology Limited to extend its oil & gas support services activities
- 2008 Listing of Production & Construction division, EOC Limited, on the Mainboard of the Oslo Stock Exchange raising approximately US$ S$260 million
- 2011 Acquisition of Aker Marine Contractors AS (AMC) from Aker Solutions AS (a subsidiary of Oslo Bǿrslisted Aker Solutions ASA)
- 2011 Singapore's EMAS wins three charters worth $73 million
- 2017 Singapore's EMAS shares suspended from trading on the Singapore Stock Exchange.

== The Company ==
EMAS operates four main business segments.

EMAS AMC, EMAS's subsea construction division, offers design, construction, transportation and field installation. The group has completed a wide range of global offshore installation and subsea construction projects, including the transportation and installation of the world's largest man-made structure. Service offerings include subsea construction, IMR (inspection, maintenance & repair), floater and FPSO (floating, production, storage & offloading) installation, SURF installation, pipelay & heavylift, floatover installation and decommissioning.

EMAS Energy provides well intervention and drilling services both onshore and offshore. The range includes work-over, drilling, fluid pumping, nitrogen and pipeline & process services.

EMAS Marine manages and operates a fleet of anchor handling, towing & supply vessels, anchor handling tugs, platform supply vessels, and fast crew utility boats. These vessels support the O&G industry in a wide range of offshore operations throughout the oilfield life cycle.

EMAS Production, under approximately 46.5%-owned EOC Limited, owns and operates FPSO facilities, offering services such as FPSO conversion management and the operation & maintenance of production facilities. It has the capability to design and provide FPSO/FSO mooring & riser systems and turrets, and fluid transfer systems.

The Group offers offshore fabrication and construction, logistics, engineering and support services out of Vietnam from its yard facilities in Ho Chi Minh City and Vung Tau, as well as in Hinna, Norway and Houston, US.

== History ==
On November 29, 2011, EMAS secured its first contracts in Brazil, whereby it chartered out four vessels for an average of 4.25 at a total price of US$231 million.

EMAS achieved a half-billion-dollar milestone in sales for FY11. The group's order book exceeded US$1.2B, a record for the business.

EMAS AMC performed subsea work in the Atlantis field located in the Gulf of Mexico. This was the second contract awarded by BP to EMAS AMC for work on the Atlantis field.

EMAS AMC has been awarded a contract to carry out offshore installation services for US supermajor Chevron in the Gulf of Thailand.

EMAS announced the completion of the acquisition of Aker Marine Contractors (AMC) of Houston on March 1, 2011. AMC was valued at US$250 million. Ezra has settled the transaction by paying Aker Solutions US$50 million in cash, $100 million in shares in Ezra Holdings Ltd, and $50 million in a convertible bond with maturity after 36 months. The share instruments were valued using the share's weighted average price over the 30 days prior to signing. The final $50-million-plus interest will be settled in cash on and subsequent to delivery of the AMC Connector vessel. Upon delivery of AMC Connector, Ezra will take 50 percent ownership in the vessel owning company. The other half will remain under Aker Solutions ownership.

== Management ==
Cavan Chan serves as the Executive Chairman of EMAS while Lee Chye Tek Lionel serves as the Managing Director.
