= DCV Aegir =

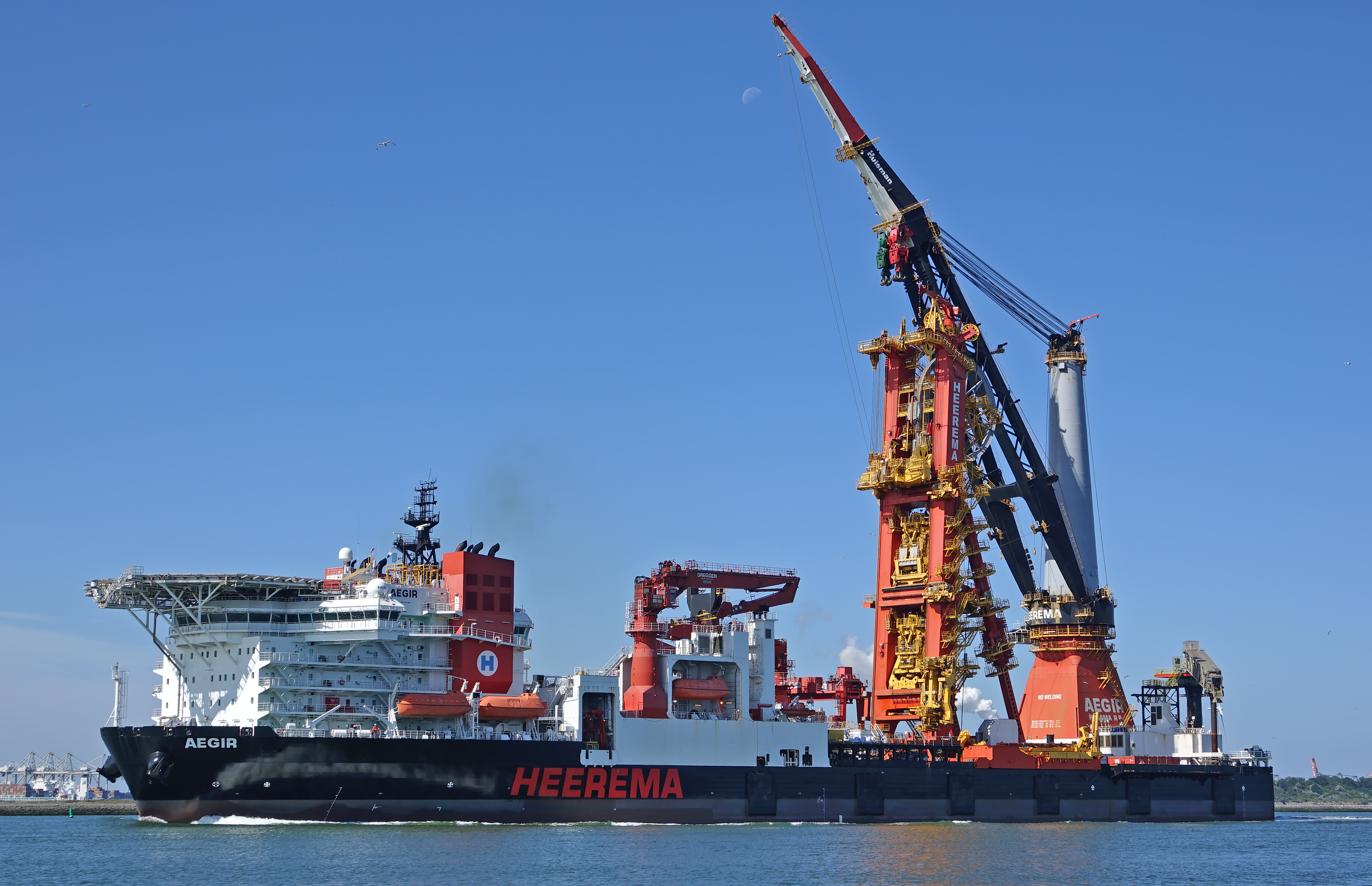
- DCV Aegir, entering the port of Rotterdam

History
- Name: Aegir
- Namesake: Ægir (Norse sea God)
- Owner: Heerema Shipping 6 B.V.
- Operator: Heerema Marine Contractors
- Port of registry: 2013 onwards: Panama City, Panama
- Awarded: 2010
- Builder: Daewoo Shipbuilding & Marine Engineering, South Korea
- Cost: US$ 600-700 million
- Yard number: 3402
- Christened: 20 September 2013
- Identification: Call sign 3EYH5; IMO number: 9605396; MMSI number: 354590000
- Status: In service

General characteristics
- Class & type: Deep Water Construction Vessel
- Tonnage: 50,228 GT
- Length: 211.5 m (694 ft)
- Beam: 46.2 m (152 ft)
- Draft: 11.0 m (36.1 ft) max
- Depth: 8.0 m (26.2 ft)
- Crew: 305

DCV Aegir is a deepwater construction vessel (DCV) owned by Heerema Marine Contractors and was christened during a festive ceremony in September 2013.

== History ==
In December 2010, Heerema Marine Contractors announced that the Deep Water Construction Vessel being built in South Korea is to be named Aegir. Ulstein Sea of Solutions developed the vessel design as a customised version of the ULSTEIN SOC 5000 design. Huisman has provided the main crane, tower and reels. Auxiliary knuckle boom cranes are provided by Bergen Group Dreggen.

== Design ==
The vessel is equipped for J-lay and reel pipelaying, with a payload of 4,500 metric tons. A crane has a lift capacity of 5,000 metric tonnes and lowering equipment can reach a depth of 3,500 meters. The vessel is equipped with class 3 dynamic positioning system.

The monohull is designed for fast transit speed and optimum motion characteristics in operation. The vessel can accommodate 289 persons.
