= Nord Stream 2 =

Natural gas pipeline between Russia and Germany

- Map of the Nord Stream 2 pipeline

Location
- Country: Russia; Germany
- Coordinates: 59°32′46″N 28°09′25″E; 54°8′24″N 13°38′23″E
- Direction: east–west–south
- Start: Ust-Luga, Russia
- Passes through: Gulf of Finland and Baltic Sea
- To: Lubmin near Greifswald, Germany

General information
- Type: Natural gas
- Status: Inoperable (Pipe A); Inactive (Pipe B)
- Partners: Gazprom; Uniper; Wintershall Dea; OMV; Engie; Shell
- Operator: Nord Stream 2 AG
- Pipe manufacturer: EUROPIPE; OMK; Chelyabinsk Pipe-Rolling Plant (Chelpipe)
- Pipe installer: Allseas (until 21 December 2019)
- Pipe layer: Pioneering Spirit; Solitaire; C10; Akademik Cherskiy; Fortuna
- Expected: Unknown

Technical information
- Length: 1,234 km (767 mi)
- Maximum discharge: 55 billion m^{3}/a (1.9 trillion cu ft/a)
- Diameter: 1,220 mm (48 in)
- No. of compressor stations: 1
- Compressor stations: Slavyanskaya, near Ust-Luga
- Website: www.nord-stream2.com

Nord Stream 2 (German–English mixed expression for "North Stream 2"; Russian: Северный поток — 2) is a 1,234-kilometre-long (767 mi) natural gas pipeline from Russia to Germany running through the Baltic Sea, financed by Gazprom and several European energy companies. Feasibility studies began in 2011 to expand the Nord Stream 1 line and double annual capacity to 110 billion cubic metres (3.9 trillion cubic feet), with construction beginning in 2015. It was completed in September 2021, but did not enter service. Planning and construction of the pipeline were mired in political controversy over fears that Russia would use it, one of 23 pipelines between Europe and Russia, for geopolitical advantage over Europe, and more specifically, Ukraine.

German chancellor Olaf Scholz suspended its certification on 22 February 2022, following official recognition of the Donetsk People's Republic and Luhansk People's Republic by the Russian State Duma and President Putin during the prelude to the Russian invasion of Ukraine.

On 26 September 2022, Danish and Swedish authorities reported a number of explosions at pipes A and B of the Nord Stream 1 pipeline and pipe A of the Nord Stream 2 pipeline, with the resulting damage causing significant gas leaks. The European Union considers the incident to be sabotage of key European energy infrastructure. The Nord Stream explosions also resulted in the worst release of methane gas in human history, with estimates ranging from 100,000 to 400,000 tonnes (220 to 880 million pounds) of methane released into the atmosphere. In October 2022, Russia confirmed that Pipe B of the Nord Stream 2 pipeline escaped destruction, and offered to resume gas supply to Europe (which was promptly declined by Berlin).

Nord Stream 2 never delivered any gas, while Russia suspended gas deliveries through Nord Stream 1 from August 31, 2021, quoting "maintenance needs". This situation became permanent after the destruction of three of the pipelines in September 2022 and sanctions linked to the Russian invasion of Ukraine.

Out of the three separate investigations carried out by Germany, Sweden and Denmark, the latter two were closed without publicly assigned responsibility for the damage in February 2024. In June 2024 German authorities issued an arrest warrant for a Ukrainian national suspected of the sabotage, who according to the Polish National Public Prosecutor's Office had since fled to Ukraine. In October 2025 the suspect was arrested in Poland, where a Polish court ruled that the European arrest warrant was without merit after which the suspect was released.

In response to the Russian invasion of Ukraine the EU Commission adopted on 18 July 2025 a sanctions package against Russia that bans the direct and indirect use of the Nord Stream pipelines.

== History ==
In 2011, Nord Stream AG started evaluation of an expansion project consisting of two additional lines (later named Nord Stream 2) to double the annual capacity up to 110 billion m^{3} (3.9 trillion ft^{3}). In August 2012, Nord Stream AG applied to the Finnish and Estonian governments for route studies in their underwater exclusive economic zones for the third and fourth lines. It was considered to route the additional pipelines to the United Kingdom but this plan was abandoned.

In January 2015, Gazprom announced that the expansion project had been put on hold since the existing lines were running at only half capacity due to EU sanctions on Russia over the annexation of Crimea in 2014. In June 2015, an agreement to build Nord Stream 2 was signed between Gazprom, Royal Dutch Shell, E.ON, OMV, and Engie. As the creation of a joint venture was blocked by Poland, in April 2017, Uniper, Wintershall, Engie, OMV and Royal Dutch Shell signed a financing agreement with Nord Stream 2 AG, a subsidiary of Gazprom responsible for the development of the Nord Stream 2 project.

On 31 January 2018, Germany granted Nord Stream 2 a permit for construction and operation in German waters and for landfall areas near Lubmin. In May 2018 construction started at the Greifswald end point. NS2 was expected to reduce gas price in Europe, as LNG has conversion costs.

In January 2019, the US ambassador in Germany, Richard Grenell, sent letters to companies involved in the construction of Nord Stream 2 urging them to stop working on the project and threatening them with the possibility of sanctions. In December 2019, the Republican Senators Ted Cruz and Ron Johnson also urged Allseas owner Edward Heerema to suspend the works on the pipeline, warning him that the United States would otherwise impose sanctions. Cruz formally proposed such a bill to enable sanctions in November 2021.

In December 2019, Allseas announced that the company had suspended its Nord Stream 2 pipelaying activities, anticipating enactment of the US National Defense Authorization Act for Fiscal Year 2020, which contained sanctions. In May 2020, the German energy regulator refused an exception from competition rules that require Nord Stream 2 to separate gas ownership from transmission. In August 2020, Poland fined Gazprom €50 million due to its lack of cooperation with an investigation launched by UOKiK, the Polish anti-monopoly watchdog. UOKiK cited competition rules against Gazprom and companies financing the project, suspecting that they had continued work on the pipeline without permission from the government of Poland.

In December 2020, the Russian pipelaying ship Akademik Cherskiy continued pipe-laying. In January, Fortuna, another pipe-layer, joined forces with the Akademik Cherskiy to complete the pipeline. On 4 June 2021, Vladimir Putin announced that the pipe-laying for first line of the Nord Stream 2 had been fully completed. On 10 June, the sections of the pipeline were connected. The laying of the second line was completed in September 2021.

In June 2021, US Secretary of State Antony Blinken said that Nord Stream 2 completion was inevitable. In July 2021, the US urged Ukraine not to criticise a forthcoming agreement with Germany over the pipeline. On 20 July, Joe Biden and Angela Merkel reached a conclusive deal that the US may trigger sanctions if Russia used Nord Stream as a "political weapon". The deal aims to prevent Poland and Ukraine from being cut off from Russian gas supplies. Ukraine will receive a $50 million loan for green technology until 2024 and Germany will set up a billion-dollar fund to promote Ukraine's transition to green energy to compensate for the loss of the gas transit fees. The contract for transiting Russian gas through Ukraine will be prolonged until 2034 if the Russian government agrees.

On 16 November 2021, European natural gas prices rose by 17% after Germany's energy regulator suspended approval of the Nord Stream 2.

On 9 December 2021, Polish Prime Minister Mateusz Morawiecki called on Germany's newly appointed Chancellor Olaf Scholz to oppose the start-up of Nord Stream 2 and not to give in to pressure from Russia. On a visit to Rome, Morawiecki said: "I will call on Chancellor Scholz not to give in to pressure from Russia and not to allow Nord Stream 2 to be used as an instrument for blackmail against Ukraine, an instrument for blackmail against Poland, an instrument for blackmail against the European Union."

Scholz suspended certification of Nord Stream 2 on 22 February 2022 in consequence of Russia's recognition of the Donetsk and Luhansk republics and the deployment of troops in territory held by the DPR and LPR.

Nord Stream 2 AG filed for bankruptcy on 1 March 2022 and laid off all 106 employees from its headquarters in Zug, Switzerland.

On 26 September 2022, a massive pressure loss and signs of large gas releases near the Danish island Bornholm were reported. Shortly after, gas leaks from the two pipelines were discovered within the Danish and Swedish economic zones. The day after the leaks occurred, Swedish police opened an investigation of the incident, calling it "major sabotage". The investigation is conducted in cooperation with other relevant authorities as well as the Swedish Security Service. A similar investigation was opened in Denmark. The two nations were in close contact, and had also been in contact with other countries in the Baltic region and NATO. These gas leaks were soon considered to be sabotage. On 29 September 2022, the Swedish Coast Guard confirmed a second leak from Nord Stream 2 very close to a larger leak found earlier on Nord Stream 1.

== Development ==
=== Costs and financing ===
For Nord Stream 2, the loan from Uniper, Wintershall Dea, OMV, Engie, and Royal Dutch Shell covers 50 percent of the projected costs of €9.5 billion. The rest is being financed by Gazprom.

=== Project companies ===
Nord Stream 2 was developed and is operated by Nord Stream 2 AG, a subsidiary of the Russian state energy company Gazprom headquartered in Zug, Switzerland.

=== Contractors ===
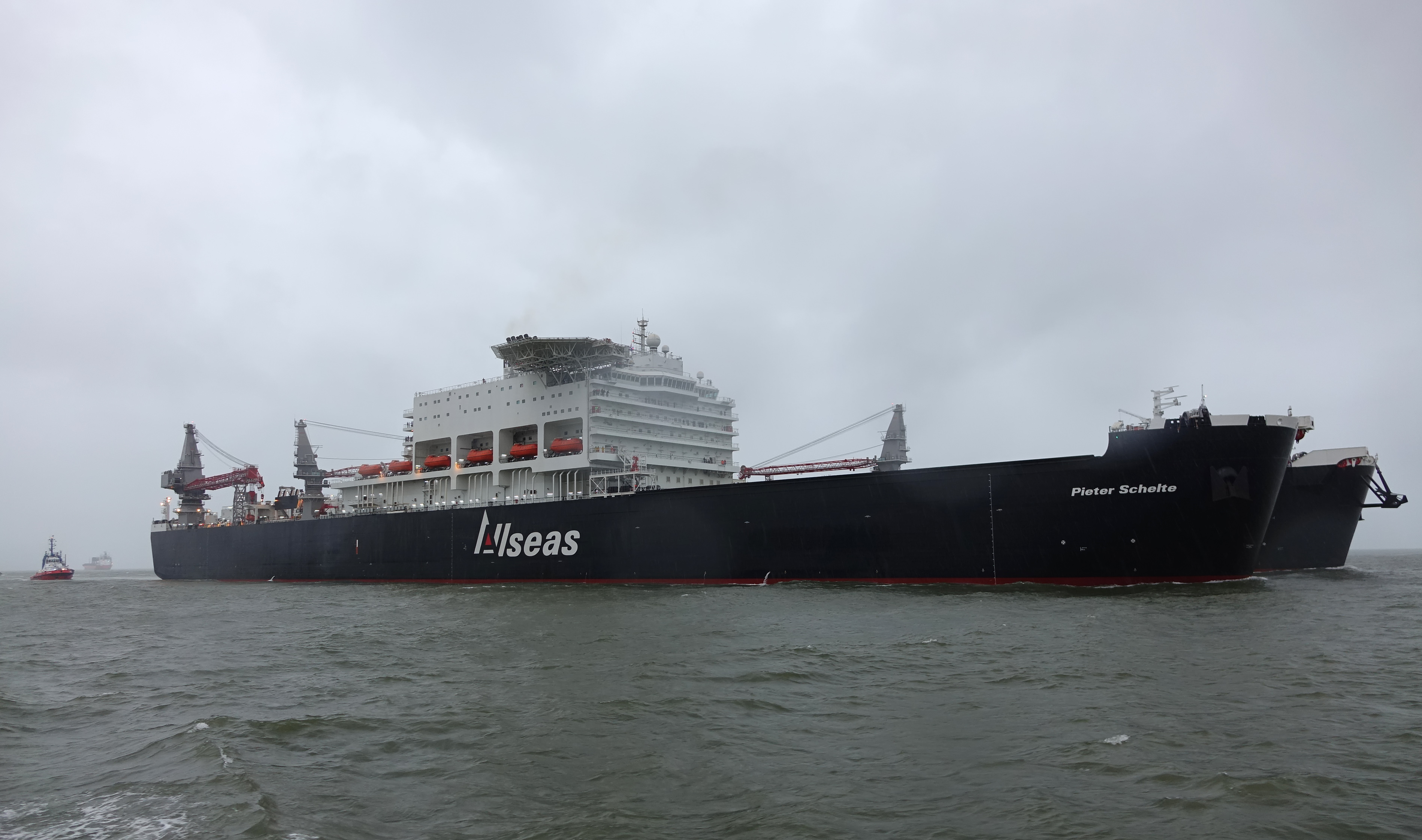
Pioneering Spirit was one of the ships involved in pipelaying.

Nord Stream 2 was laid by Allseas using pipe-laying vessels Pioneering Spirit and Solitaire, except the part of the German offshore section which was laid by Saipem's pipe-laying vessel C10. Pipes were manufactured by EUROPIPE, OMK and the Chelyabinsk Pipe-Rolling Plant (Chelpipe), and were coated by Wasco Coatings Europe. Blue Water Shipping handled the transportation and storage of pipeline segments in Germany, Finland and Sweden for Wasco. A joint venture of Boskalis and Van Oord did rock placement at the preparatory stage of construction. Kvaerner did the civil and mechanical engineering of the onshore facilities in Russia.

== Technical features ==
=== Route ===
| Country | Length | Comment | Permit | Construction |
|---|---|---|---|---|
| Russian Federation | 118 km | landfall, Baltic Sea (territorial waters) | | |
| Finland | 374 km | Baltic Sea (Exclusive Economic Zone) | 2018-04-05 Government Consent for the use of the Finnish EEZ granted, 2018-04-12 permit for pipeline construction and operation according to the Water Act | 2019-08-21 installation completed |
| Sweden | 510 km | Baltic Sea (Exclusive Economic Zone) | 2018-06-07 construction and operation permit for the Swedish section of the route | |
| Denmark | 147 km | Baltic Sea (Exclusive Economic Zone) | 2019-10-30 Danish Energy Agency granted a construction permit for the South-Eastern Route | |
| Germany | 85 km | Baltic Sea (Exclusive Economic Zone and territorial waters), landfall | 2018-01-31 | |

Except for the Russian and Danish section, the route of Nord Stream 2 follows mainly the route of the Nord Stream 1 pipeline.

=== Russian onshore-pipeline ===
To feed Nord Stream 2, 2,866 km (1,781 mi) of new pipeline and three compressor stations were built and five existing compressor stations were expanded. The feeding pipeline starts in Gryazovets and follows the existing route of the Northern Lights pipeline. In Volkhov, the pipeline turns south and continues to the Slavyanskaya compressor station near Ust-Luga.

=== Baltic Sea offshore pipeline ===
Nord Stream 2 starts at the Slavyanskaya compressor station near Ust-Luga port, located 2.8 km (1.7 mi) south-east of the village of Bolshoye Kuzyomkino (Narvusi) in the Kingiseppsky District of the Leningrad Oblast, in the historical Ingria close to the Estonian border. A 3.2 km (2.0 mi) onshore pipeline runs from the compressor station to the landfall at the Kurgalsky Peninsula on the shore of Narva Bay. The landfall point in Kolganpya (Kolkanpää) at the Soikinsky Peninsula was considered as an alternative.

Except for the Russian section, the route of Nord Stream 2 follows mainly the route of Nord Stream 1. From the Russian landfall, a 114 km (71 mi) section runs through Russian territorial waters to the Finnish exclusive economic zone. The Finnish section is 374 km (232 mi) and the following section in the Swedish exclusive economic zone is 510 km (320 mi) long.

The 147 km (91 mi) Danish sections runs on the Danish continental shelf southeast of Bornholm. The German part of the pipeline consists of 85 km (53 mi) of offshore pipeline and 29 km (18 mi) onshore pipeline connecting the landfall with the Nord Stream 2 receiving terminal. Nord Stream 2 has two parallel lines, each with a capacity of 27.5 billion m^{3} (970 billion ft^{3}) of natural gas per year.

=== German onshore pipelines ===
Nord Stream 2 is connected to the NEL pipeline and European Gas Pipeline Link (EUGAL), which runs largely parallel to the OPAL pipeline.

== Legal aspects ==
=== EU gas directive ===
According to the amended EU gas directive, the EU extended its gas market rules to external pipelines entering the EU internal gas market. It applies to all pipelines which were completed after 23 May 2019 when amended directive entered into force. Additional legal concerns relate to international trade law and to the law of the sea in connection with Nord Stream 2's route through the Danish territorial waters around Bornholm.

Nord Stream 2 AG had started legal proceedings in the Court of Justice of the European Union to annul the amended directive and also started arbitration against the EU under the Energy Charter Treaty. Although Russia has not ratified the Energy Charter Treaty and has terminated its provisional application, both the EU and Switzerland — a domicile of Nord Stream 2 AG — are contracting parties of it.

=== US sanctions and subsequent waiver and negotiations ===
In June 2017, new US sanctions against Russia targeting the pipeline were passed by a 98–2 majority in the United States Senate due to concerns that President Trump would ease existing sanctions on Russia. The sanctions were sharply criticized by Germany, France, Austria and the European Commission who stated that the United States was threatening Europe's energy supplies. In a joint statement, Austrian Chancellor Christian Kern and German Foreign Minister Sigmar Gabriel said, "Europe's energy supply is a matter for Europe, and not for the United States of America." They also said: "To threaten companies from Germany, Austria and other European states with penalties on the US market if they participate in natural gas projects such as Nord Stream 2 with Russia or finance them introduces a completely new and very negative quality into European-American relations."

Isabelle Kocher, chief executive officer of Engie, criticised American sanctions targeting the projects, and said they were an attempt to promote American gas in Europe. Olaf Scholz, German Finance Minister at the time, called the sanctions "a severe intervention in German and European internal affairs", while the EU spokesman criticized "the imposition of sanctions against EU companies conducting legitimate business." Heiko Maas, German Foreign Minister at the time, tweeted that "European energy policy is decided in Europe, not in the United States". Russian Foreign Minister Sergey Lavrov also criticized sanctions, saying that United States Congress "is literally overwhelmed with the desire to do everything to destroy" Russia–United States relations.

The German Eastern Business Association said in a statement that "America wants to sell its liquefied gas in Europe, for which Germany is building terminals. Should we arrive at the conclusion that US sanctions are intended to push competitors out of the European market, our enthusiasm for bilateral projects with the US will significantly cool."

In January 2019, the US ambassador in Germany, Richard Grenell, sent letters to companies involved in the construction of Nord Stream 2 urging them to stop working on the project and threatening with the possibility of sanctions. In December 2019, the US Congress approved sanctions on companies and governments working on the pipeline, to which German Foreign Minister Heiko Maas responded, urging the US not to meddle in European energy policy. Following the US Senate's vote to override the Trump administration's veto of the defense bill containing punitive measures on the pipeline, the US State Department alerted companies of sanctions risk they face, urging them to pull out from the project. According to a PolitiFact "fact check", the sanctions did not impede construction of the pipeline.

In December 2019, with overwhelming support from Democrats and Republicans, the US Congress imposed sanctions on any firm aiding in the building of the pipeline as part of the annual defense policy bill. The pipeline's construction was stalled for a year until Russia secured its own vessels to complete the job.

Following incoming President Joe Biden's inauguration in January 2021, the White House reaffirmed long standing US opposition to Nord Stream stating that Biden "continues to believe that Nord Stream 2 is a bad deal for Europe" and that his administration "will be reviewing" new sanctions. According to congressional aides cited in a February report by NBC News, the sanctions enjoyed "strong bipartisan support" on Capitol Hill.

On 19 May 2021, the United States President Joe Biden waived sanctions on Nord Stream 2 AG and its CEO Matthias Warnig, in a move that was opposed by both Republican and Democratic lawmakers, with Republican senator Jim Risch saying it was "a gift to Putin and will only weaken the United States". Russian and German officials welcomed the sanctions waiver, but Yuriy Vitrenko of Naftogaz criticized the move and said Ukraine would press Washington to impose sanctions to stop the pipeline. On 25 May at the White House, President Biden told reporters that he waived the sanctions because the pipeline was nearly completed and because they would have hurt relations with Europe.

In protest against the Biden administration's policies, senator Ted Cruz held up dozens of diplomatic nominations, telling CNN "I look forward to lifting the holds just as soon as they impose the sanctions on Nord Stream 2 that are required by federal law." According to PolitiFact, this positive signal to Germany and Russia was accompanied by sanctions on other areas of Russian industry as part of a changing strategy to reopen negotiations over Ukraine.

On 19 May 2021, the US government waived sanctions against the main company involved in the project, Nord Stream 2 AG, while imposing sanctions on four Russian ships and five other Russian entities. Russian Deputy Foreign Minister Sergei Ryabkov welcomed the move as "a chance for a gradual transition toward the normalisation of our bilateral ties". Ukrainian President Volodymyr Zelenskyy said he was "surprised" and "disappointed" by Biden's decision. Biden also waived sanctions on the Nordstream CEO, Matthias Warnig, an ally of Russian President Vladimir Putin. On 22 November 2021, the US State Department announced that it had imposed further sanctions on a Russian vessel and a "Russian-linked entity".

Washington Post reported that Biden obtained a promise from Angela Merkel in summer 2021 and that Nord Stream 2 would not be sanctioned, but that Germany would support other sanctions and that Germany would scrap Nord Stream 2 if Russia invaded Ukraine. By the time Russia invaded in 2022, Olaf Scholz had replaced Merkel, but Scholz kept the promise.

On 21 July 2021, the US and Germany proposed an agreement to complete the Nord Stream 2 pipeline while shielding Ukraine and other Central and Eastern European countries from any future Russian efforts to use the pipeline as a geopolitical weapon. The deal was immediately opposed by Ukraine and Poland and US lawmakers on both sides of the aisle, with Foreign Policy reporting that it had become a "lightning rod issue" and that "Biden's post-Trump-era honeymoon period with some Eastern European allies has come to a screeching halt." Deutsche Welle reported that the deal promoted "strong condemnation" from Poland, with government spokesman Piotr Müller saying "We have emphasized from the very beginning that Nord Stream 2 is a geopolitical project that destabilizes the political situation in central and eastern Europe." Lithuanian Prime Minister Ingrida Šimonytė called the project a "mistake" saying it was not just for its economic impact on Ukraine, but for the EU's increased dependence on a country where there is no rule of law.

In September 2021, a group of bipartisan lawmakers in the US House of Representatives attempting to undo Biden's decision to waiver sanctions, introduced an amendment to the defense bill. In November 2021, a group of Senate Republicans led by senator Risch renewed efforts to impose sanctions on the pipeline, also as an amendment to the National Defense Authorization Act (NDAA) defense bill. In response, the Biden administration reportedly lobbied Democratic allies to nix the sanctions amendments, and Secretary of State Antony Blinken and top aides reportedly made calls urging senators to kill the sanctions amendments that would remove leeway for a White House waiver. Republicans stalled the bill from passing on 29 November, but it passed the next week on 7 December, omitting the sanctions amendments despite strong support for them in Congress.

On 13 January 2022, US Senator Ted Cruz introduced a bill to reimpose the waived sanctions regardless whether Russia invaded Ukraine. Democrats favored a more extensive version which would impose a wider range of sanctions besides those on Nord Stream 2. The bill was voted on with 55 senators (49 Republicans, 6 Democrats) in favor, and 44 Democrats who opposed the bill with Senate Foreign Relations Chair Bob Menendez arguing that imposing immediate sanctions centered on Nord Stream 2 regardless if Russia invaded Ukraine would give Putin one less reason not to invade and that sanctions would have to go far beyond Nord Stream to be effective. The Cruz bill failed to secure 60 votes needed for passage but Senators continued work towards a bill expanding sanctions far beyond those on Nord Stream.

Following reports of Russian troops massing near the border with Ukraine and fears of an invasion, US Secretary of State Antony Blinken announced new sanctions on 23 November, targeting eight people and 17 vessels as "pursuant to PEESA in connection with Nord Stream 2".

In order to provide strong incentives for Russia not to invade Ukraine, bill sponsor Senator Bob Menendez argued that sanctions would have to be devastating to the entire Russian economy, and that every Russian would have to feel them. The wider set of sanctions in Senate bill 3488, "Defending Ukraine Sovereignty Act of 2022" would impose significant compliance challenges for companies doing business in Russia, not just Nord Stream and its European and Russian backers. Although both parties had reached agreement on central parts of the plan, by mid February Biden and US intelligence agencies were briefing allies and Congressional leaders that Russia would likely invade.

The work on the sanctions bill was paused and replaced with a declaration critical of Russia's provocative and reckless military buildup along Ukraine's border and warning Putin to cease his threats to Ukraine and NATO. Earlier in the month, Menendez and Senate minority leader Mitch McConnell had been personally assured during a visit by German Chancellor Scholz that if Russia invaded, Nord Stream 2 would be halted.

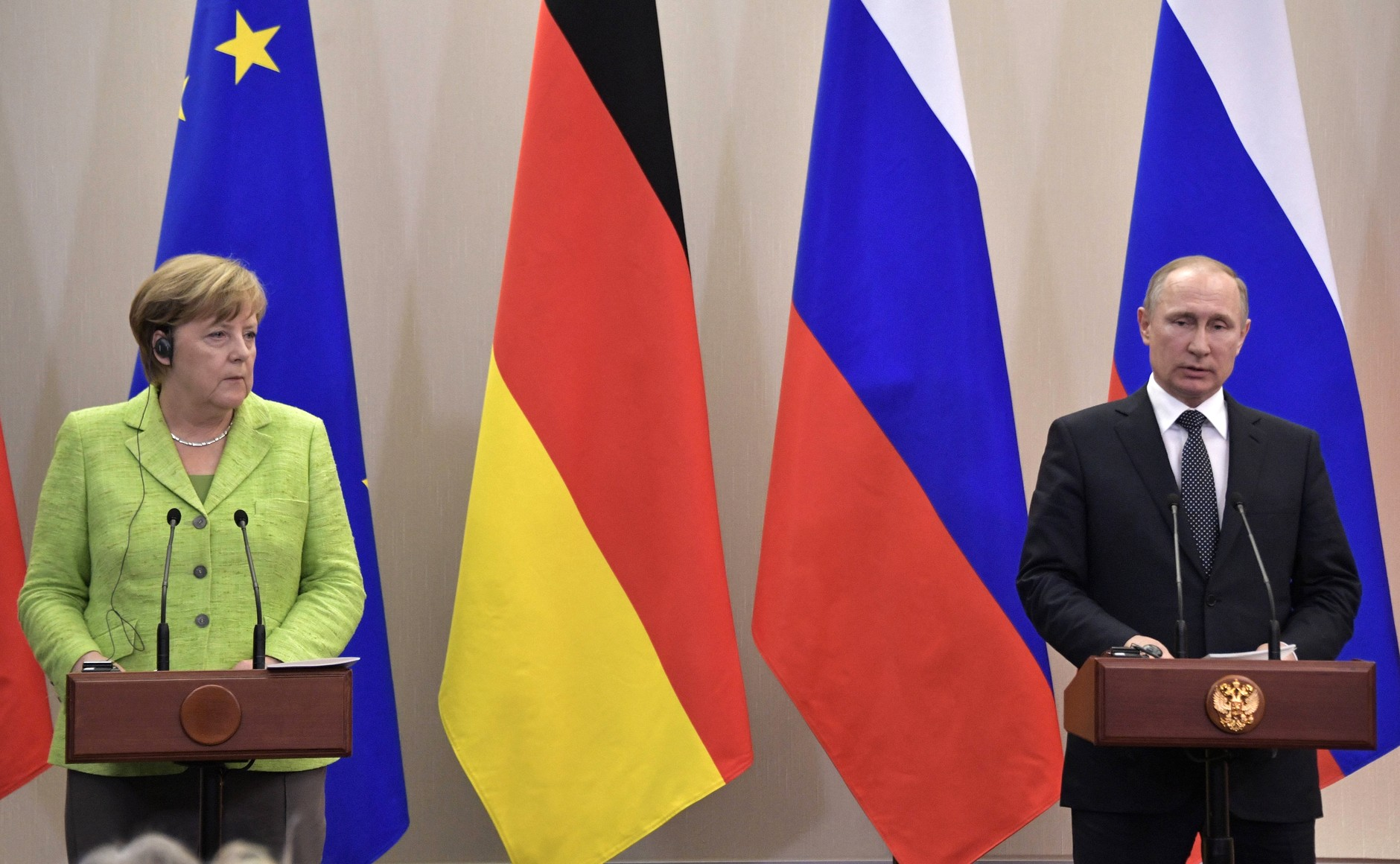
Angela Merkel criticized the United States's sanctions against Russia that target EU–Russia energy projects.

=== Regulatory clearance by Germany ===
In late October 2021, the approval of the pipeline was still in process as permits were expected from the German regulatory Federal Network Agency (Bundesnetzagentur) and finally from the European Commission later that year. The German agency still awaited the processing of applications by the Ukrainian gas company Naftogaz and the Ukraine gas grid company GTSOU. Poland also voiced opposition to the approval of the pipeline as it feared a lack of Russian gas transits through its territory. However, spokesperson for the German Ministry of Economy Beate Baron said on 22 October 2021 "all the available capacities for natural gas supplies from Russia to Europe are used".

Earlier that week, the Swiss-based operator confirmed it had filled the first line of the pipeline with "technical" gas. On 21 October 2021, Russian President Vladimir Putin stated that the pipeline would start gas delivery the day after Germany approved it. Regulatory clearance for Nord Stream 2 would double Russia's gas exports to the Baltic and Germany to 110 billion cubic metres (3.9 trillion cubic feet) per year. Economic pressures for its approval in Germany were mounting, as tight supplies and soaring prices increased costs in transportation and heating fuel markets.

Approvals for gas delivery through the fully constructed pipeline were further delayed in late November 2021, when Germany required that part of the assets of the Switzerland-registered Nord Stream AG including the pipeline itself to be transferred to a Germany-registered business entity. Concurrently, the US Department of State imposed more financial sanctions on Russian companies connected to Nord Stream 2. President Joe Biden earlier waived sanctions on German companies involved in the project. The US and the European Union had accused Russian-owned Gazprom of not having delivered sufficient gas through existing pipelines, while Russia claimed that those pipelines were already delivering natural gas at full capacities. According to energy analysts, the delay of gas deliveries through Nord Stream 2 had significantly exacerbated the 2021 energy crisis.

==== Suspension of certification by Germany ====
In February 2022, Menendez and Senate minority leader Mitch McConnell had been personally assured during a visit by German Chancellor Scholz that if Russia invaded, Nord Stream 2 would be halted.

On 2 March, it was reported that Nord Stream 2 AG, a subsidiary of Russian state-owned gas company Gazprom, had ended business operations and laid off all 106 members of its staff as a result of sanctions imposed as a result of the Russian invasion of Ukraine, though earlier reports that it had filed for bankruptcy were denied.

Royal Dutch Shell, which financed 10% of the project, may have to write off $1 billion if it never opens. On 2 March, Wintershall Dea revealed that it had decided to write off its financing of Nord Stream 2, which it highlighted totals around €1 billion. On 7 March, Uniper announced that it had taken the decision to record a full impairment loss on its loan to Nord Stream 2. The company noted that it will recognize an impairment loss of its loans towards Nord Stream 2 AG in the amount of €987 million.

Nord Stream 2 AG could seek compensation from the German government and international arbitration under the Energy Charter Treaty (ECT).

Dmitry Medvedev, deputy chairman of the Security Council of Russia wrote on online social media service Twitter: "welcome to the new world where Europeans will soon have to pay 2,000 euros per thousand cubic metres!" suggesting prices were set to double.

=== European Commission ===
European Commission President Ursula von der Leyen said the future of the pipeline would depend on Russia's actions in Ukraine. On 19 February 2022 she told the Munich Security Conference that Europe could not be overly dependent on Russia for its energy needs.

== Controversies ==
=== Political aspects ===
President Barack Obama opposed Nord Stream 2, echoing the policy of his predecessor George W. Bush who opposed Nord Stream 1. The US and European nations such as Ukraine, Poland, Estonia, Latvia and Lithuania opposed Nord Stream 2 on the grounds that it increased dependence on Russian energy and posed a security threat to the EU. After 2014, these countries further argued that Europe should not be refilling Russia's coffers after it invaded and annexed Crimea. In January 2018, United States Secretary of State Rex Tillerson reaffirmed the policy, stating US and Poland opposed the Nord Stream 2 pipeline, for the same reasons of European energy security and stability.

The Nord Stream 2 pipeline has been opposed by a wide range of US and European leaders, including Ukrainian President Volodymyr Zelenskyy, (Note: Ukraine has 11 pipelines with Russia and a further 3 with Russia through Belarus, Poland has 4 pipelines with Russia through Belarus and Ukraine, Slovakia has 1 pipeline with Russia through Ukraine, and Estonia has 3 pipelines with Russia.) Polish Prime Minister Mateusz Morawiecki, Slovak President Zuzana Čaputová, US President Donald Trump, former US President Joe Biden, Estonian PM Kaja Kallas, the European Council President Donald Tusk and former British foreign minister Boris Johnson. Tusk has said that Nord Stream 2 is not in the EU's interests. Former Italian Prime Minister Matteo Renzi and Hungarian Prime Minister Viktor Orbán have questioned the different treatment of Nord Stream 2 and South Stream projects.

Some claim that the project violates the long-term declared strategy of the EU to diversify its gas supplies. A letter, signed by the leaders of nine EU countries, was sent to the EC in March 2016, warning that the Nord Stream 2 project contradicts the European energy policy requirements that suppliers to the EU should not control the energy transmission assets, and that access to the energy infrastructure must be secured for non-consortium companies.

An anti-trust investigation against Gazprom started in 2011 revealed a number of "abusive practices" the company applied against various recipients in the EU and Nord Stream 2 was criticized from this angle as strengthening Gazprom's position in the EU even more. European Commission officials expressed the view that "Nord Stream 2 does not enhance [EU] energy security".

Sberbank's investment research division in 2018 voiced concerns from Russian stakeholders' perspective, specifically that the project's goals are exclusively political:

Gazprom's decisions make perfect sense if the company is assumed to be run for the benefit of its contractors, not for commercial profit. The Power of Siberia, Nord Stream 2 and Turkish Stream are all deeply value-destructive projects that will eat up almost half of Gazprom's investments over the next five years. They are commonly perceived as being foisted on the company by the government pursuing a geopolitical agenda. A more important characteristic that they share, however, is the ability to employ a closely knit group of suppliers in Russia, with little outside supervision.

— Sberbank CIB, Russian Oil and Gas - Tickling Giants, 2018

=== Public opinion in Germany ===
A representative Forsa study conducted in May 2021 found that 75% of Germans were in favor of the construction of Nord Stream 2, while only 17% were against it. The survey found that broad support for the completion of the project could be found in all voter groups. This was after Germany's phase out from nuclear power plants.

Public support for Nord Stream 2 by party (May 2021)
| DIE LINKE | 92% |
| AfD | 84% |
| FDP | 82% |
| CDU/CSU | 81% |
| SPD | 75% |
| B'90/GRÜNE | 69% |

=== Criticism of US sanctions and obstruction efforts ===
The Ost-Ausschuss der Deutschen Wirtschaft (Committee on Eastern European Economic Relations) criticised that US sanctions and obstruction efforts were thus threatening democratic processes in Germany and Europe, endangering Germany's interests, and causing damages estimated to be several billion euros at the expense of European taxpayers and businesses.

=== Role of Denmark ===
While Denmark had all the natural gas it needed, it became the centre of the geopolitical conflict due to Bornholm. Denmark has maritime territorial rights in the waters south of Bornholm, where the Nord Stream 2 consortium wanted to build, parallel to the already existing gas line Nord Stream 1. While the US is Denmark's most significant security ally, Germany is arguably the most important EU partner for Denmark, which meant that Denmark was in an undesirable position, where its closest allies had conflicting interests. An official application for the route was received in 2017. After the application, the Danish Parliament added an amendment to the Continental Shelf legislation, so that security and foreign policy considerations could be weighed together with environmental and economic considerations when assessed applications for submarine pipelines in the Danish territorial Sea. Thus the application for the initial route through Danish territorial sea ended on the Danish Minister of Foreign Affairs' table, where it laid for so long that the consortium behind Nord Stream 2 ended up withdrawing its application in 2018. A permit was given in 2019 for an alternative southeastern route in the Danish exclusive economic zone.

=== Opposition ===
Nord Stream 2 faced opposition from Western politicians outside Germany, who saw it as an instrument of Russian influence in German and European politics. Common reasons for the opposition to Nord Stream 2 are negative historical relations with Russia and strongly supporting common and shared EU positions towards Russia.

President of the European Council Donald Tusk said that Nord Stream 2 is not in the EU's interests. Italian Prime Minister Matteo Renzi and Hungarian Prime Minister Viktor Orbán have questioned the different treatment of Nord Stream 2 and South Stream projects. Some claim that the project violates the long-term declared strategy of the EU to diversify its gas supplies.

A letter, signed by the leaders of nine EU countries, was sent to the EC in March 2016, warning that the Nord Stream 2 project contradicts the European energy policy requirements that suppliers to the EU should not control the energy transmission assets, and that access to the energy infrastructure must be secured for non-consortium companies. Isabelle Kocher, chief executive officer of Engie, criticised American sanctions targeting the projects, and said they were an attempt to promote American gas in Europe.

In June 2017, Germany and Austria criticized the United States Senate over new sanctions against Russia that target the planned Nord Stream 2 gas pipeline from Russia to Germany, stating that the United States was threatening Europe's energy supplies. In a joint statement Austria's Chancellor Christian Kern and Germany's Foreign Minister Sigmar Gabriel said that "Europe's energy supply is a matter for Europe, and not for the United States of America." They also said: "to threaten companies from Germany, Austria and other European states with penalties on the U.S. market if they participate in natural gas projects such as Nord Stream 2 with Russia or finance them introduces a completely new and very negative quality into European-American relations."

In January 2018, United States Secretary of State Rex Tillerson said that the U.S. and Poland oppose the Nord Stream 2 pipeline, saying they see it as undermining Europe's overall energy security and stability. The Nord Stream 2 pipeline was also opposed by Ukrainian President Petro Poroshenko, Polish Prime Minister Mateusz Morawiecki, U.S. President Donald Trump, the European Council President Donald Tusk and British Foreign Secretary Boris Johnson.

=== Stance of Germany and role of the SPD ===
Questions have mounted about the links between the pipeline project, leaders of Germany's Social Democratic Party (SPD), and Moscow. One of the last acts of former Chancellor Gerhard Schröder in office was to sign the deal creating the Nord Stream 1 project in 2005. Schröder subsequently became chairman of the company behind it and took several directorial positions in Russian energy companies in the following years. In more recent years, opposition to his lobbying became more heated across Germany.

The project was supported by the northeastern German state of Mecklenburg-Vorpommern, the landfall site for the line, and where former Chancellor Angela Merkel had her constituency. In 2019 the US sanctioned German companies and individuals helping to build the line. In January 2021, state premier Manuela Schwesig set up the Climate and Environmental Protection Foundation of Mecklenburg-Vorpommern to "acquire, manage, own, provide or let land, tools and machines to help the completion" of the pipeline. In 2022, questions mounted about the foundation, its association with Gazprom and its activities that helped companies helping to build the project evade US sanctions. On 24 February 2022, the German Court of Auditors expressed concern about the foundation, which said it would stop helping the pipeline project, declining to say what it had done so far. Public records showed it purchased a ship to complete the laying of pipeline in the Baltic.

In January 2022, the new German Chancellor Olaf Scholz, who long supported the project, came under pressure to block the project at the 2022 EU summit. Amid reported misgivings of many in the Biden administration about Berlin's stance on Russia, Chancellor Scholz visited the US for what Foreign Policy called a "salvage mission". After avoiding the pipeline issue at a press conference at the White House on 7 February, Scholz responded to repeated questions from reporters saying the US and Germany were "absolutely united", while Biden went further and said that the Nord Stream 2 project would end if Russia invaded Ukraine.

An evaluation ordered by German government on 18 October 2022 concluded that "certification of Nord Stream 2 threatens the security of gas supplies in Germany and the entire European Union". Among the main reasons the report indicated Russia's deliberate failure to fill gas storage facilities (2021), demanding payment in rubles, arbitrary manipulation and suspension of gas flows in Nord Stream 1 and Russian government sanctions against Gazprom Germania and EuRoPol Gaz, operators of alternative European pipelines. All of these facts indicated that Russia is determined to use the gas supplies as a weapon rather than regular trade relationship.

Following the meeting with Biden and ahead of a meeting scheduled with Russian President Vladimir Putin for 15 February, Scholz faced criticism in the media for refusing to say openly that Germany would cancel the pipeline in the event of a Russian invasion of Ukraine, though others said it was due to diplomatic tactics or legal concern. Following the Scholz and Putin meeting in Moscow, Putin said the pipeline would cement European energy security, and that it is "purely commercial". Scholz then visited Kyiv to meet Ukrainian president Zelenskyy and avoided answering questions about the pipeline at a joint press conference.

In February 2023 internal audit of tax authorities in Mecklenburg-Western Pomerania revealed that tax declarations by a Gazprom-funded climate foundation were missing, initially declared as lost, then ultimately found at home of one of the tax office employees who subsequently burned it in her fireplace.

In 2024 German media released documents which indicated that top politicians from SPD lobbied for the project and supported its investors in spite of official stance being that the German state considers it exclusively as a "private business project". German Greens demanded a parliamentary commission to investigate this involvement. Mecklenburg-Vorpommern state representative Christian Pegel (SPD) responsible for the Energy sector in the state from 2014 to 2021, repeatedly took Russian positions on Nord Stream 2 and allegedly had the statute for the Nord Stream 2 foundation written by a law firm commissioned by the Nord Stream 2 AG, instead of writing it himself, like he claimed. He is also accused of having deleted important messages on the project.

=== Alternative gas import mechanisms ===
As a result of the Russian invasion of Ukraine and the global natural gas supply crises, on 27 February, German Chancellor Olaf Scholz announced that Germany would build two LNG terminals for seaborne LNG imports quickly, one at Brunsbüttel and another at Wilhelmshaven. The Wilhelmshaven LNG terminal opened and became operational in December 2022. By August 2022, this had expanded to plans to open facilities at five floating LNG facilities in Germany as soon as practicable.

Unusually, environmental impact assessments are being explicitly skipped according to Robert Habeck, a Green party politician and the economic affairs minister in the current German government, saying "ensuring Germany was no longer blackmailable by Putin had to take priority."

The Wilhemshaven terminal alone is sized to receive approximately 80 LNG tankers each year, which could substitute for up to half of the gas imports that the German energy company Uniper formerly imported from Russia, and could supply approximately eight percent of early-2022 German gas demand.

=== Others ===
The Economist warned that Europe was becoming more dependent on Russia while its own reserves decline. Vincent Roberti of Roberti Global and Walker Roberts of BGR Group have received more than $5 million and $1.3 million respectively to lobby the US Congress for the gas project.

In 2024 German FAZ published results of investigation indicating that the certification for Nord Stream 2 construction was issued in conflict on interest and involving political pressure and various personal-business connections, and it likely should have never been granted.

=== 2022 sabotage ===
On 26 September 2022, Denmark and Sweden almost simultaneously reported four gas leaks from Nord Stream 1 and 2 in the Baltic Sea; two leaks in the economic zone of each country. Despite the fact that Nord Stream 1 was shut down and Nord Stream 2 had not commenced transporting gas, there was gas under pressure in each of the four pipes, most of it methane. More than half of the gas had already leaked out at the time of reporting, and there were no containment mechanisms in the pipelines – the rest of the gas was expected to leak out before 1 October. By 10 October, some gas was still seeped out of Nord Stream 2, with a surface plume 15 metres (49 ft) wide.

Andrew Baxter, director of energy strategy for the Environmental Defense Fund, said he estimated that about 115,000 tonnes (250 million pounds) of methane had been released into the environment. To date, this may be the largest gas leak in human history. According to German estimates, about 300,000 tonnes (660 million pounds) of methane, which is one of the most potent greenhouse gases (more potent than CO_{2}), was emitted into the atmosphere. This amount of gas is enough to affect the environment for another 20 years, with an annual gas emission capacity of 5.48 million combustion-engined cars.

On 29 September, Russian President Vladimir Putin said the "unprecedented sabotage" against the Nord Stream gas pipelines was "an act of international terrorism" carried out by the West, US forces specifically, claiming the United States would have "much to gain from sabotaging the pipelines" even offering to keep supplying the EU by the only Nord Stream 2 gas pipeline that remained operable. The charge was denied by both US and its NATO allies. While not directly pointing fingers at Russia, European leaders have suggested a foreign attempt to "energy blackmail" NATO citizens into withdrawing their support in Ukraine while noting that it is Russia, not Europe, that benefits from chaos in the energy markets and the war.

Two artificial craters, 248 metres (814 ft) apart, each with a depth of 3 to 5 metres (9.8 to 16.4 ft) were found on the seabed with pipeline debris scattered up to 250 metres (820 ft) away.

Denmark, Germany and Sweden each initiated separate investigations, describing the explosions as sabotage. The Swedish and Danish investigations were closed in February 2024 without identifying those responsible, however the German public prosecutor affirmed in July 2026 that the man responsible for the sabotage was following orders from Ukraine.

== See also ==
- Blue Stream
- Russia–Ukraine gas disputes
- TurkStream
- Yamal–Europe pipeline
