= YME =

YME can refer to:

== Businesses and organisations ==
- Yahoo! Music Engine
- Yamaha Motor Company Europe
- Young Money Entertainment, a record label
- Y-ME National Breast Cancer Organization, a non-profit

== Places ==
- Matane Airport, Quebec, Canada
- Yellow Medicine County, Minnesota, United States
  - Yellow Medicine East High School, in Granite Falls
- Yme field, a small Norwegian oil field in the North Sea

== Other uses ==
- Ymir (or Yme), a giant/jotun in Norse mythology
- Yme (name), a Dutch given name
  - Yme Drost
