= Akademik Cherskiy (ship) =

Pipe layer ship

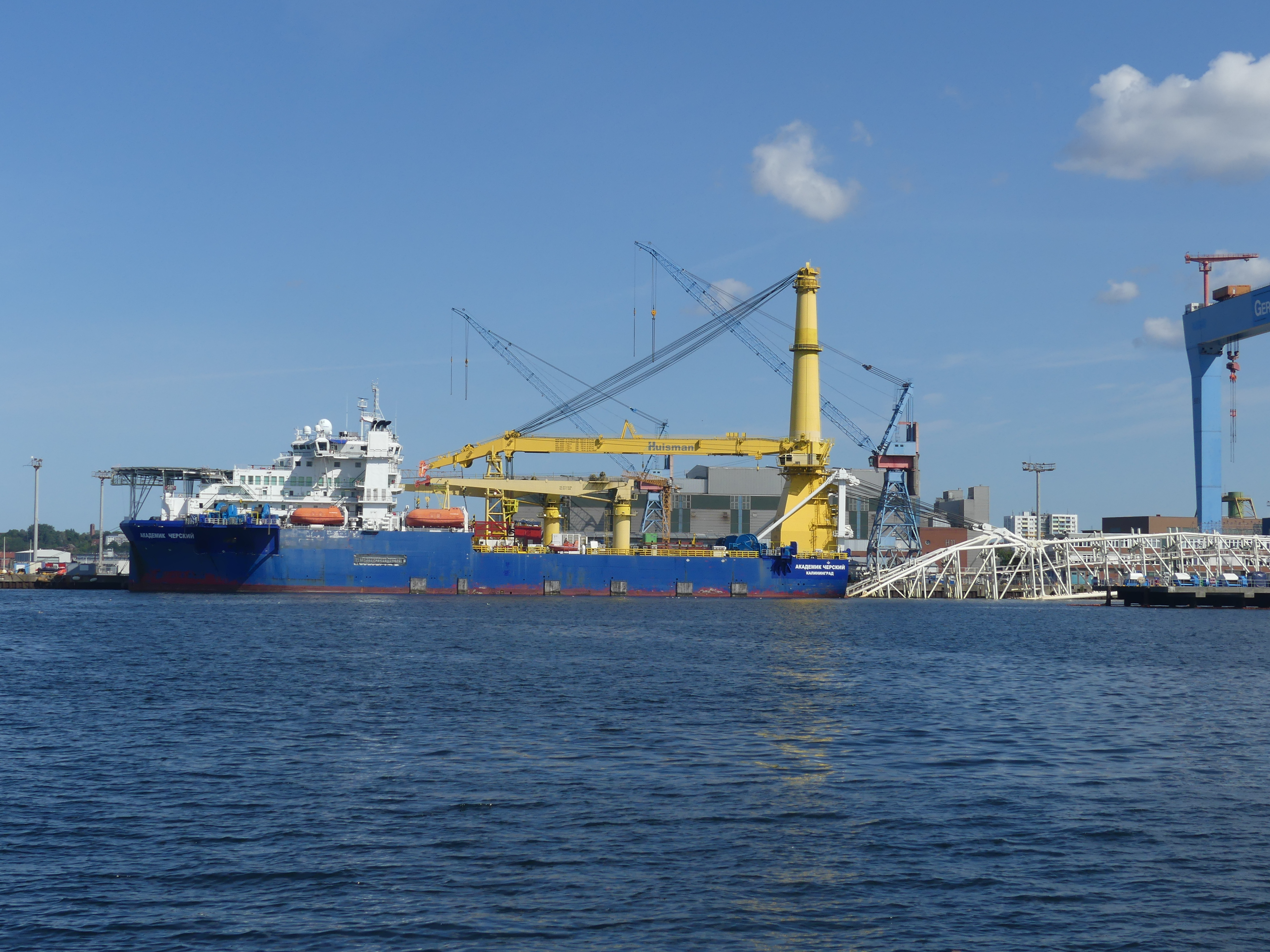
Akademik Cherskiy at Kiel

Akademik Cherskiy (Russian: Академик Черский) is a pipe-layer vessel formerly involved in the construction of the Nord Stream II pipeline in the Baltic Sea.

== History ==
The construction of the ship had two different phases. The initial works began in 2007 and were done by Jiangsu Hantong Heavy Industries near Shanghai in China. The second phase was completed in 2015 in a shipyard in Singapore on orders of a then unknown company. It was originally christened Jascon 18. Sea Trucks Group (STG), a Dutch-Nigerian joint venture and the Nigerian Walvis International were at times linked to the vessel but these ownerships were not corroborated. In 2016 it was known that the owner of the ship was MRTS, a company linked to Gazprom and completed in Singapore in 2015. MRTS later sold the ship to Gazprom Flot and Russian newspapers appear to confirm that Gazprom has sold the ship since. In December 2019, after the United States threatened to sanction Allseas, the pipe layer involved in the construction in the Nord Stream pipe-line up to this time would not finish its construction and Akademik Cherskiy was taken into consideration to finish the job the pipe layers of Allseas have begun. In February 2020, starting in Nachodka in far-east Russia, it began its journey over the Cape of Good Hope to Sassnitz, the Baltic Sea where it arrived in June 2020. In Sassnitz, the vessel underwent an extensive upgrade which would prepare the ship for the works at the Nord Stream II pipe-line. In December 2020, it was announced that the vessel has been deployed to take up the work to complete Nord Stream II where it joined another Russian pipe-layer Fortuna in April.
