= Yme field =

Norwegian oil field in the North Sea

- Location within North Sea
- Country: Norway
- Location: Central North Sea
- Block: 9/2-3, 9/2-6 S, 9/2-7 S, 9/2-9 S
- Offshore/onshore: Offshore
- Coordinates: 57°48′57.91″N 4°32′07.69″E
- Operator: Statoil (1996–2001); Talisman Energy (2010–2015); Repsol (2015–...)
- Partners: Repsol; Grupa Lotos; OKEA; KUFPEC

Field history
- Discovery: 1987
- Start of production: 1996

Production
- Recoverable oil: 56 million barrels (~7.6×10^{6} t)

Yme is an oil field in the Egersund basin area in the central part of the North Sea. It is located 160 kilometres (99 mi) northeast of the Ekofisk oil field. The water depth is 93 metres (305 ft). The field was discovered in 1987 and developed by Statoil with production from 1996 to 2001. In 2001, low oil prices led to the abandonment of the field. After the production license was relinquished by Statoil, a new license group led by Talisman Energy was formed to redevelop the field. In 2007 Talisman was granted permission to redevelop the field. The redevelopment was unsuccessful and the newly installed Yme MOPU STOR was abandoned and decommissioned without having entered production. A new attempt called the Yme New Development was launched by the new operator Repsol, which involved reusing the subsea installations already in place. The Yme field began producing again in 2021, marking the first time that a previously abandoned Norwegian oil field has been restarted.

== Original development by Statoil ==
The field was produced by Statoil from February 1996 until it was closed down in 2001. The field was produced using the jackup rig Maersk Giant equipped with oil producing facilities. The produced oil was transferred to the tanker Polysaga, which had a storage capacity of up to 160,000 cu meters of oil. Polysaga was moored and loaded by the subsea turret loading system (STL). The oil from Polysaga was offloaded to a shuttle tanker and transported to the Statoil Mongstad terminal near Bergen for final processing and fiscal metering. Mongstad had to upgrade its desalters in order to be able to handle the Yme crude. The field was abandoned in a time of low oil prices after having produced 56 million barrels (8.9×10^{6} m^{3}) of oil (15% recovery of original oil in place).

== Redevelopment by Talisman Energy ==
Talisman began redevelopment of the field in 2008. The redevelopment project was intended to include the installation of 12 production and injection wells and a subsea storage tank. Talisman Energy initially hoped to recover a further 56 million barrels (8.9×10^{6} m^{3}) of oil over a period of 10 years. The Talisman-led redevelopment suffered from large cost overruns and extended delays in bringing the field onstream. As of January 2017, first production from the field is not expected until 2019.

Talisman selected to develop the field using a production jackup platform with a subsea storage tank (MOPU STOR). Drilling will be completed by a separate drilling rig that will leave the field once drilling is completed. The MOPU STOR platform was designed and constructed by SBM Offshore who previously developed the concept for the Siri field. In July 2011 SBM announced the successful installation of the Yme platform, stating that the remaining commissioning activities were expected to be complete before the end of 2011. Subsequently, poor weather conditions led to the delay of the commissioning work and in May 2011 Talisman announced a writedown of $250 million on the project and delayed expected first production for an unspecified amount of time.

=== MOPU STOR platform structural issues ===
In July 2012 Talisman evacuated 140 construction workers from the YME platform as a safety precaution after the discovery of cracks in the cement grouting surrounding the legs of the platform. In a letter to Norway's Petroleum Safety Authority (PSA) dated 26 July Talisman warned that without repair there is a high probability that the cracks in the cement grouting could lead to the collapse of the platform during winter storms. Talisman was subsequently given until a deadline of 31 December by the Norwegian Petroleum Directorate to deliver a new development plan for Yme which addresses its safety issues. On 26 October 2012 Talisman announced that it had agreed a plan with SBM to repair the faulty grouting by the end of the 2012.

Subsequently, the platform was abandoned, and the decision was subsequently made to remove and scrap the platform. A specialized lifting vessel called Pioneering Spirit removed the platform in August 2016.

== Yme New Development by Repsol ==
Following the takeover of Talisman by Repsol in 2015 the possibility of redeveloping Yme was considered. The decision was made to scrap the existing Yme MOPU STOR and redevelop the field with a jack-up rig fitted with production facilities while reusing the subsea crude oil storage tank and existing wells and infrastructure. The Maersk Inspirer jack-up rig was contracted from Maersk Drilling and following modifications was successfully installed on site in late 2020. In 2021 the Yme field started producing again, 20 years after the field had originally been abandoned.

== Crude oil quality ==
The crude oil produced had an API gravity of 38-39 and a sulfur content of 0.17% mass. The formation water had a high salt content with dissolved NaCl of 190.000 ppm. And there was a high asphaltene content in the crude oil.

The Yme reservoirs also had challenges such as low reservoir pressure and low dissolved gas content.
