= Pioneering Spirit =

Large crane vessel built 2013

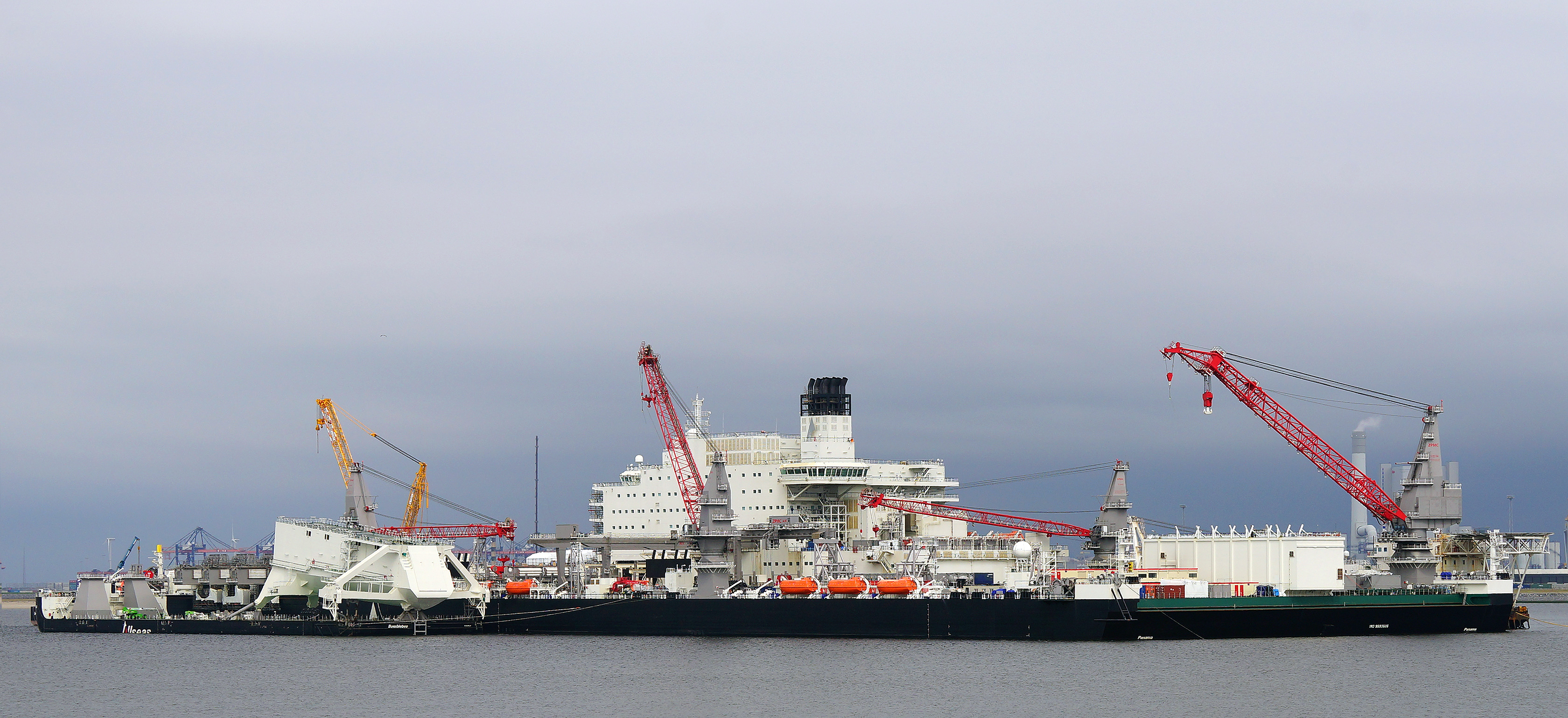
- Crane ship Pioneering Spirit, Maasvlakte 2, Rotterdam

History
- Name: 2014–2015: Pieter Schelte; 2015 onwards: Pioneering Spirit
- Owner: Societe d'Exploitation Pieter Schelte NV
- Operator: Allseas
- Port of registry: 2014–2015: Panama City, Panama; 2015 onwards: Valletta, Malta
- Builder: Daewoo Shipbuilding & Marine Engineering, Geoje, South Korea
- Yard number: 3401
- Launched: 26 January 2013
- Identification: Call sign 9HA4112; IMO number: 9593505; MMSI number: 249110000
- Status: In service

General characteristics
- Tonnage: 403,342 GT
- Displacement: 365,000 tonnes (transit); 932,000 tonnes (maximum); 1,000,000 tonnes (at maximum draft)
- Length: 382 m (1,253 ft) (hull); 477 m (1,565 ft) (maximum, including stinger and tilting lifting beams)
- Beam: 124 m (407 ft)
- Draft: 10–27 m (33–89 ft)
- Depth: 30 m (98 ft)
- Installed power: 8 x 11,200 kW MAN 20V32/44CR diesel generator sets plus one 5040 kW 9L32/44CR generator set
- Propulsion: 12 x Rolls-Royce diesel-electric azimuth thrusters (each 6,050 kW) 12 x Vulkan RATO R R 321YR couplings
- Speed: 14 knots (26 km/h; 16 mph)
- Capacity: 48,000 tonnes (topsides lift capacity); 25,000 tonnes (jacket lift capacity); 2,000 tonnes (pipelay tensioner capacity)
- Crew: Accommodation for 571

Pioneering Spirit, formerly Pieter Schelte, is a split hull crane vessel owned by Allseas designed for the single-lift installation and removal of large oil and gas platforms, and pipelines. The 382-metre-long (1,253 ft), 124-metre-wide (407 ft) vessel is the world's largest vessel by gross tonnage, the heaviest vehicle ever made and since September 2021 also the largest floating sheerleg in the world. It was built in South Korea by Daewoo Shipbuilding & Marine Engineering in 2013 at a cost of €2.6 billion. It commenced offshore operations in August 2016.

== Development ==
The initial concept, by Allseas technical director W.P. Kaldenbach, was of a vessel capable of lifting entire platforms, and in 1987 Allseas declared its intention to build it. The initial idea featured two rigidly connected, self-propelled supertankers, with a large slot at the bows enabling it to install platform topsides in one piece. Early designs featured a flotation and ballasting system and active motion compensation system to facilitate a controlled transfer of a topsides' weight from the vessel to a platform substructure. Allseas developed the original idea to include steel jacket installation, jackets and topsides removal, and rigid pipelay capabilities.

The emphasis switched from the conversion of two existing tankers to a new-build hull in 2004, though retaining the catamaran concept. The decision was prompted by a lack of suitable vessels to convert, the lower costs associated with a new-build, and the need to house sophisticated equipment – such as a dynamic positioning system – in the hull.

In 2007, twenty years after the idea was first conceived, Allseas announced plans to build the Pieter Schelte, a twin-hulled platform installation / decommissioning and pipelay vessel. Named after the offshore pioneer Pieter Schelte Heerema, the father of Allseas' owner Edward Heerema, the design featured a lifting system at its bows for lifting platform topsides up to 48,000 tonnes (53,000 short tons) and a lifting system at its stern for lifting steel jackets up to 25,000 tonnes (28,000 short tons). The design also included pipelay equipment to handle pipe diameters ranging from 15–175 cm (6–68 inches) at water depths exceeding 4,000 m (13,000 ft).

=== Construction ===
Allseas placed orders for machinery, including generators and thrusters, in 2007, and for the high-tensile steel for the lifting systems in 2008. After funding became scarce during the 2008 financial crisis, the company postponed the building schedule and delayed awarding the hull construction contract. Finnish engineering company Deltamarin performed detail engineering in 2009.

Allseas eventually was able to sign the main construction contract in June 2010 with South Korean shipyard Daewoo Shipbuilding & Marine Engineering. Midway through the build, Allseas decided to widen the ship by 6.75 m (22.1 ft) in order to increase the clearance between the bows and the legs of large platforms. As a result, the overall width increased from 117 to 124 m (384 to 407 ft), and the slot width from 52 to 59 m (171 to 194 ft).

Pioneering Spirit departed Daewoo in November 2014 and arrived at the Maasvlakte 2, Port of Rotterdam, for completion and commissioning, on January 8, 2015. After the topside lifting system was installed, she left Rotterdam on 6 August 2016.

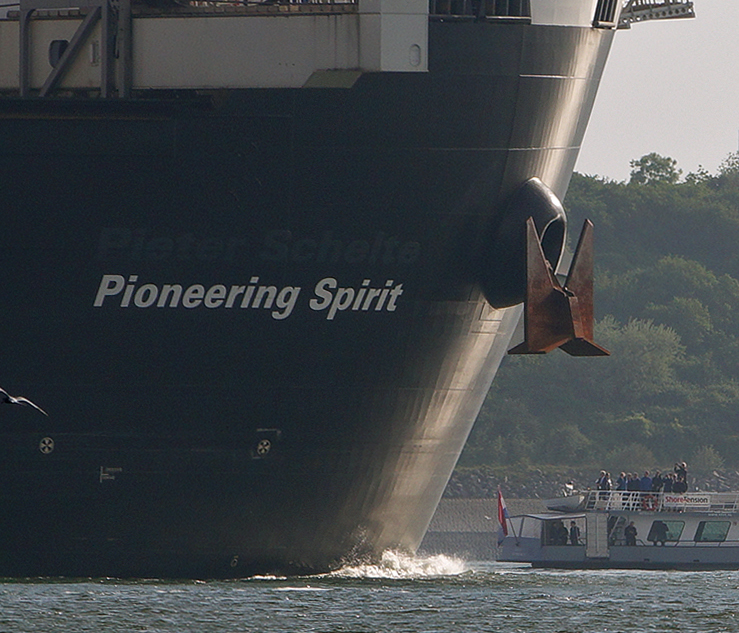
Detail at bow, showing new name Pioneering Spirit just below obscured original name Pieter Schelte

The original name caused controversy due to Pieter Schelte Heerema's service in the Waffen-SS during World War II. As a result, in February 2015, Allseas announced that the vessel's name would be changed to Pioneering Spirit.

=== Upgrades ===
In July 2019, Allseas announced a plan to upgrade the lift capacity from 48,000 tonnes to 60,000 tonnes to enable the removal of Statfjord A platform in the North Sea.

In September 2021, a set of shear legs with a lifting capacity of 20,000 tonnes was installed on the stern deck of the ship, permitting it to also hoist platform jackets. This also made it the largest floating sheerleg in the world.

== Design ==
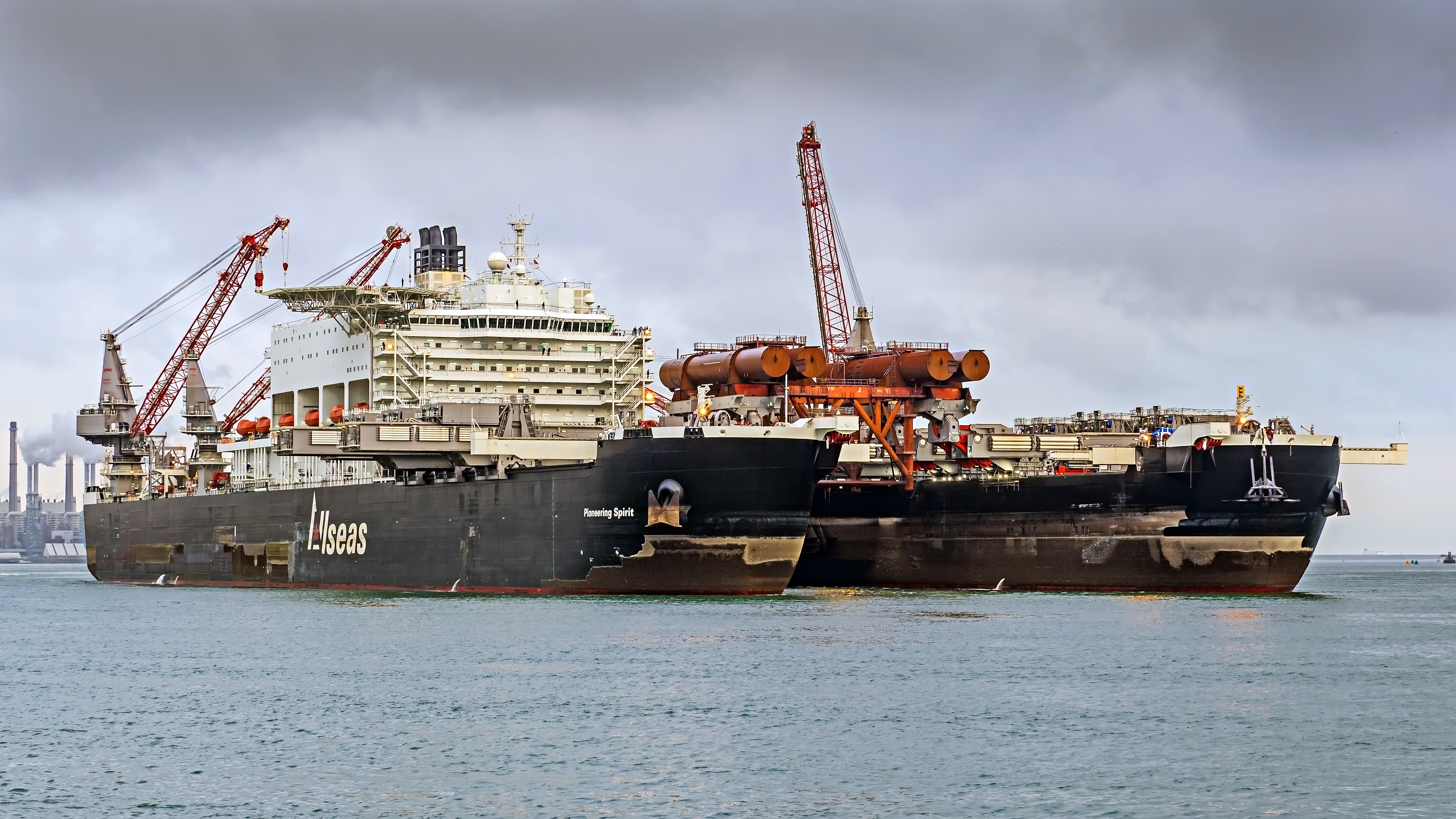
Carrying a 5,500 t (6,100-short-ton) test platform in the bow slot (Aug 2016)

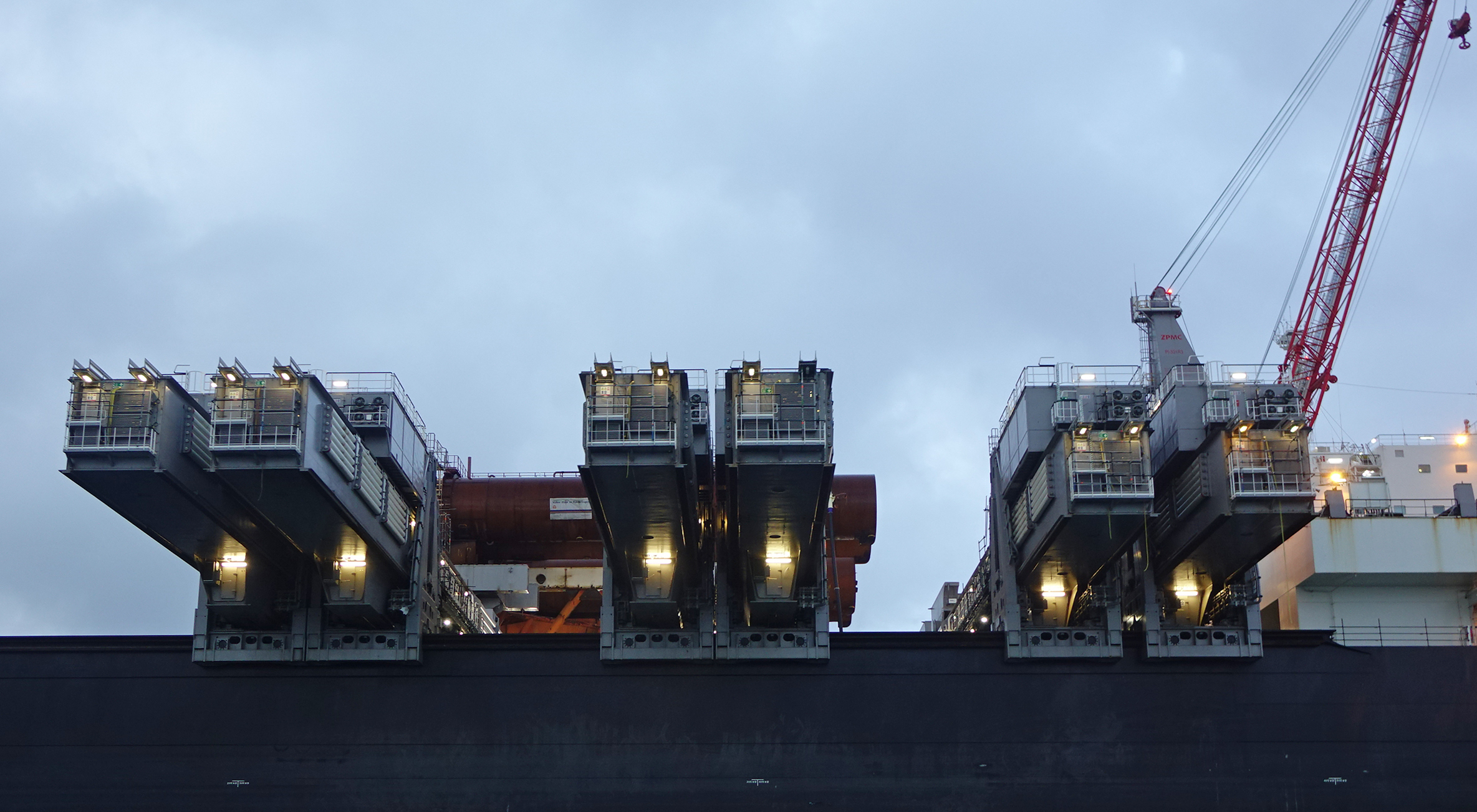
Six lifting beams, retracted (Jun 2016)

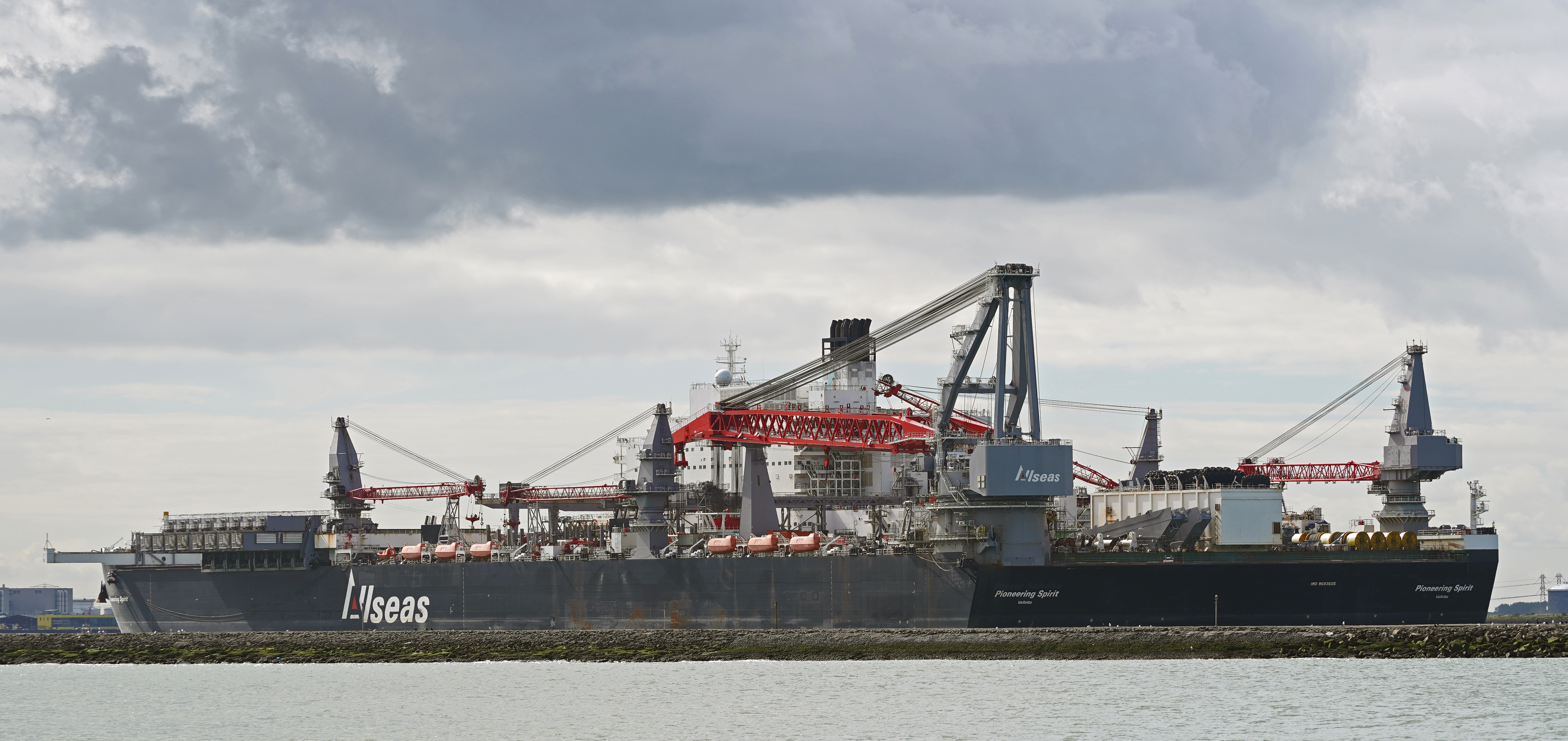
The 5,000 t (5,500-short-ton) Huisman crane is mounted in a tub on the port side of the stern (Aug 2020)

Pioneering Spirit is the world's largest vessel, in terms of her gross tonnage (403,342 gt), breadth (123.75 m or 406 ft), and displacement (1,000,000 tonnes or 980,000 long tons). The maximum 48,000-tonne (53,000-short-ton) topside lift capacity is achieved by operating as a semi-submersible. For removal of topsides, the vessel straddles the intended payload with the slot formed by the twin bows. The slot measures 122 m × 59 m (400 ft × 194 ft) (L×W). After straddling the payload, Pioneering Spirit takes on ballast to lower, and two sets of eight (one set per bow) retractable motion-compensated horizontal lifting beams are extended under the payload. Once the load is secure, the vessel offloads the ballast, rising in the water and partially transferring the load to the beams. In the final stage a fast lift system is used that lifts the payload up to 2.5 m (8.2 ft) in 15 s. Topside installation and decommissioning operations on Pioneering Spirit rely on advanced structural engineering and heavy‑lift engineering practices to manage extreme loads, motion‑compensated lifting, and precision during single‑lift activities.

Aside from the ballast lifting system, Pioneering Spirit is equipped with large conventional cranes, including a sheerleg and rotating cranes. Two tilting lift beams for the installation or removal of the steel jackets used for fixed platforms, up to 25,000 tonnes (28,000 short tons) in weight, will be located at the vessel's stern. The lift beams for the jacket lifting system were installed in 2021. A 5,000 tonnes (5,500 short tons) special purpose crane built by Huisman is scheduled for delivery in the second half of 2018. The tub mounted crane will be available for additional lifts for jacket and topsides installation such as pile handling and bridge installation. The first major lifts with the new Huisman crane were performed in August 2020.

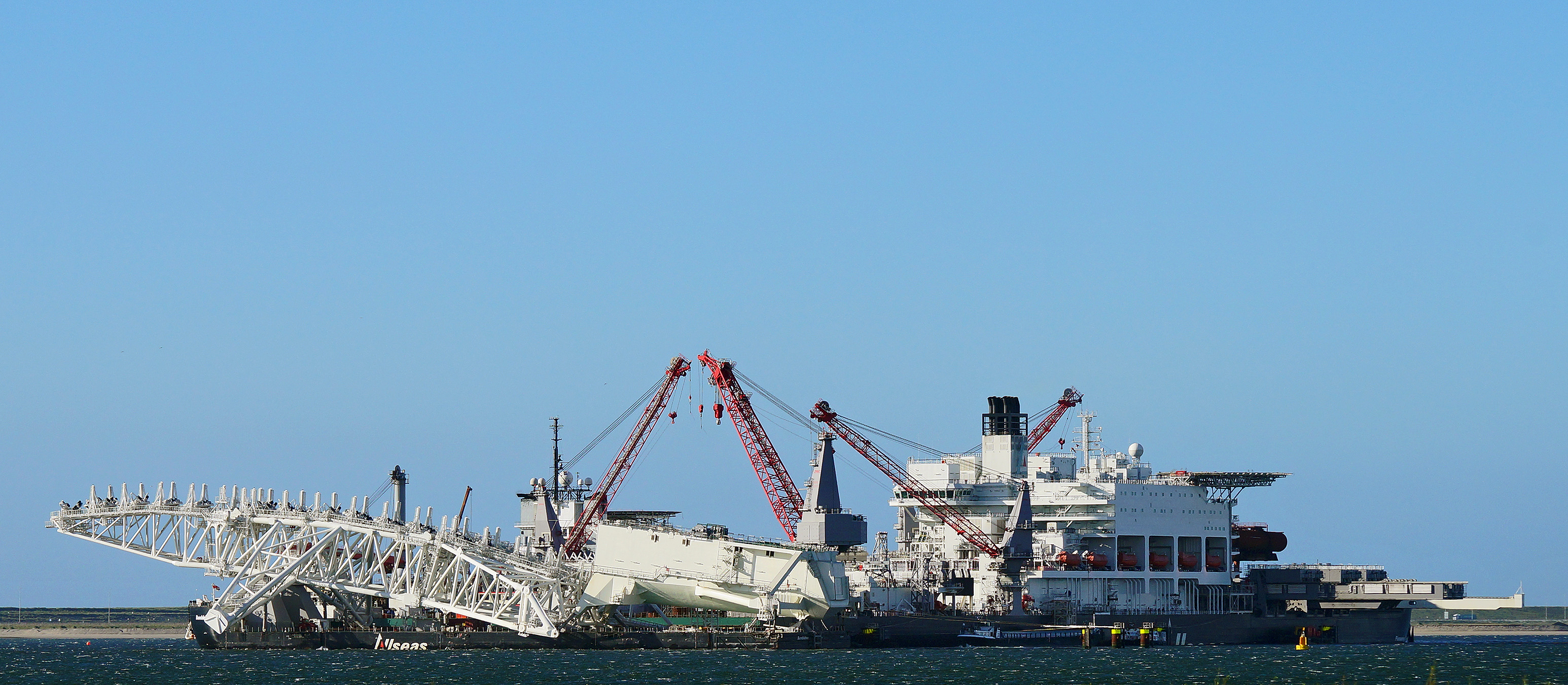
Stinger (left) and STF (centre) aboard Bumblebee; Pioneering Spirit in background on right

When equipped with the stinger, Pioneering Spirit can be used to lay pipe. Pipe segments are welded together on board the vessel, then are placed on the stinger, where they roll into the water. The stinger is curved to guide the pipe to the bottom of the ocean. The stinger itself weighs 4,200 tonnes (4,600 short tons) and measures 150 m (490 ft) long and 65 m (213 ft) wide. It is attached to the stinger transition frame (STF), which provides an interface between the stinger and the vessel; the STF is installed in the bow slot when attached to the vessel. The stinger transition frame weighs more than 1,600 tonnes (1,800 short tons) by itself.

The vessel is equipped with eight, 20-cylinder (20V32/44CR) MAN 11,200 kW diesel generators providing a total installed power of 95 MW, driving 12 Rolls-Royce azimuth thrusters which provide dynamic positioning (DP3) and propulsion. The vessel's maximum speed is 14 knots (26 km/h; 16 mph). The accommodation has room for 571 persons in two-berth cabins.

=== Iron Lady, Braveheart and Bumblebee ===
Allseas also constructed three barges to assist Pioneering Spirit. If the water depth is not sufficient to allow the vessel to approach the dock, Pioneering Spirit can unload structures to Iron Lady or Braveheart, two 200 m × 57 m (656 ft × 187 ft) (L×W) barges with shallower draft. The barges fit precisely within Pioneering Spirit's bow slot. Bumblebee was built specifically to store the stinger and STF when they are not in use.

== Projects ==
Pioneering Spirit performed her first commercial lift, removal of Repsol's 13,500-tonne (14,900-short-ton) Yme mobile offshore production unit (MOPU), on 22 August 2016. Located in the Yme field in the Norwegian sector of the North Sea, approximately 100 km (54 nautical miles) west of Stavanger, the MOPU was a jack-up type platform standing on three, 3.5-metre (11 ft) diameter steel legs. The decision to remove the platform was made in 2013, and the contract for the removal of the topsides was subsequently awarded to Allseas. Pioneering Spirit collided with the caisson of the Yme platform during the removal.

On 28 April 2017 Pioneering Spirit performed the single-lift removal of Shell's 24,200-tonne (26,700-short-ton) Brent Delta topsides. Located in the Brent field, approximately 186 km (100 nautical miles) off the northeast coast of Shetland, the iconic platform sat on a three-legged gravity-based structure in 140 m (460 ft) of water. The vessel delivered the topsides to Able UK's Seaton Port yard, Teesside, for disposal.

Pioneering Spirit installed the offshore section of SouthStream Transport's dual 930-kilometre (580 mi) Turkish Stream pipeline in the Black Sea. The pipeline construction started in May 2017 and was completed in November 2018.

Starting from the Russian coast near the town of Anapa, the 930-kilometre (580 mi), 80-centimetre (32 in) diameter twin-pipeline will traverse the Black Sea at depths up to 2,200 m (7,200 ft) and emerge onshore in Turkey's Thrace region.

She has installed three out of four platform topsides for phase one of the Johan Sverdrup development in offshore Norway. The drilling platform (DP) topside was installed in June 2018. The other two topsides named P1 and LQ were installed in March 2019. With P1 topside weighing 26,000 tons, this is one of the heaviest single-lift executed offshore to date, after Wheatstone of 36,000 ton and Arkutun Dagi of 42,380 ton, both with the H 851. The vessel is expected to return in 2022 to install P2 topside weighing 27,000 tons for phase two of the Johan Sverdrup development.

It removed Valhall QP topside for Aker BP in June 2019. This structure was an accommodation platform in the Valhall oil field, located in the southern part of the North Sea about 280 km off the Norwegian coast. Weighing 3800 ton, it is the lightest lift operation performed by the vessel.

In June 2019, Pioneering Spirit also removed the Brent Bravo 25,000-tonne topside located 186 km off the coast of Scotland on the way to Norway. By 2024 the vessel had removed all of the Brent topsides, culminating with a world-record offshore lift of 31,000 tonnes at Brent Charlie in July of that year.

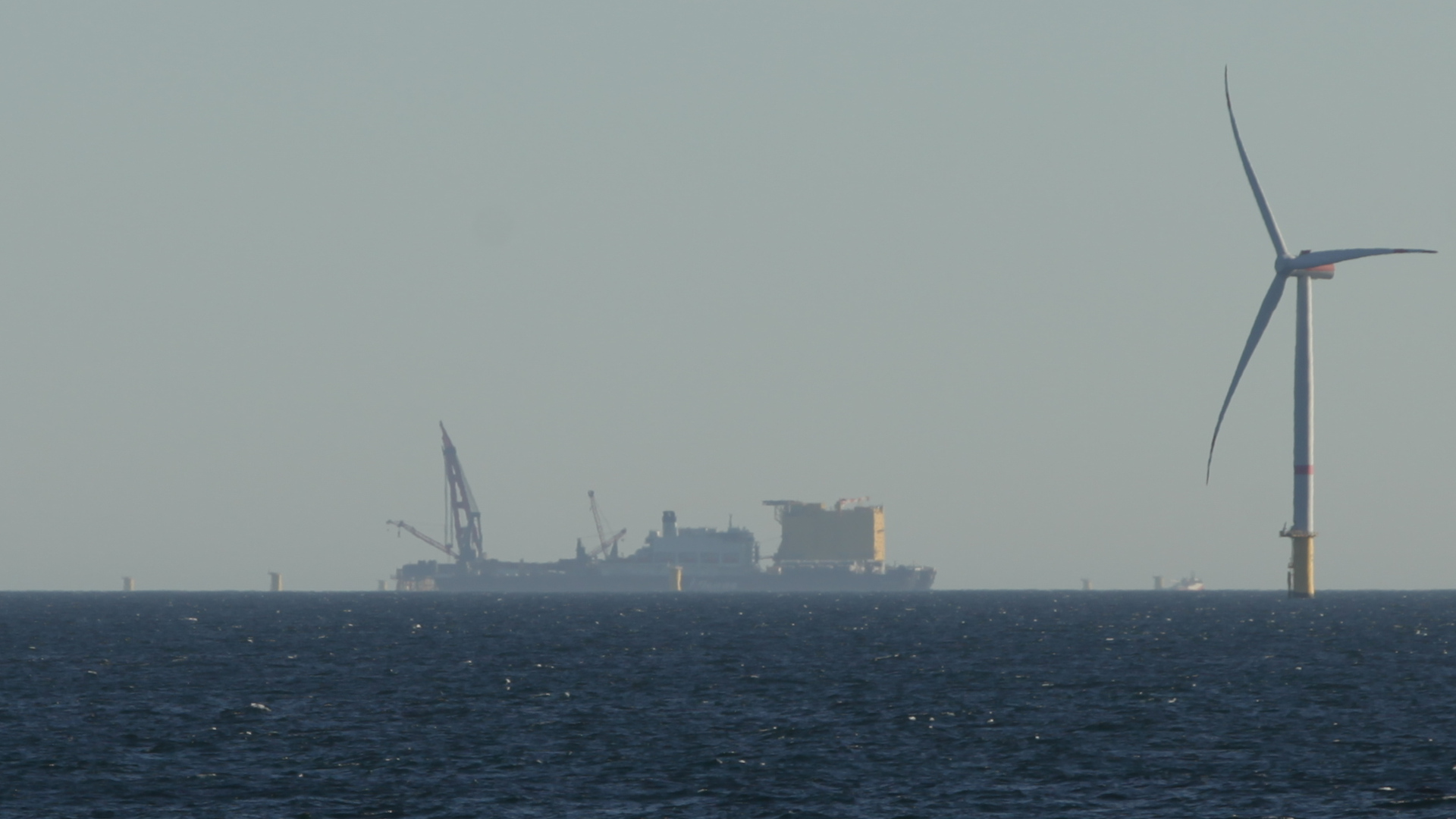
Pioneering Spirit delivering the converter platform BorWin Epsilon to windfarm He Dreiht

In 2025 Pioneering Spirit delivered the converter platform BorWin Epsilon to the windfarm He Dreiht in the north sea.

== Future designs ==
In 2018, Allseas announced its intention to build an even larger version of Pioneering Spirit, named Amazing Grace, which was scheduled to be delivered in 2025. However, in July 2020, Allseas announced that it would suspend the project indefinitely.
