= Edward Heerema =

Dutch engineer and businessman

Edward Heerema (born 1947) is a Dutch engineer, businessman and he was the sole owner of Allseas, a major offshore oil business company. The company is now run by his son Pieter. Through Allseas, he was the owner of the largest ship in the world, the pipe-layer Pioneering Spirit.

== Early life ==
Edward Heerema was born in 1947 to Pieter Schelte Heerema and Erna Heerema. He has four brothers and one sister. He spent his childhood in Venezuela where his father, after service in the Waffen-SS, had exiled himself after World War II and worked as an engineer in Maracaibo. He had a close relationship to his father, with whom he worked at his father's company Heerema Marine Contractors (HMC) for eight years. During his stay at the HMC company, he was put in charge of the research and development department. After his father died in 1981, he and his brothers took care of HMC for some years, until in 1985 he decided to found Allseas.

== Allseas ==
Allseas would become the first owner of a dynamically positioned pipe-laying ship by 1986, the Lorelay. Heerema is the sole owner of Allseas and lays importance to the independence of the company's engineering projects. The company has its own engineering department, and doesn't outsource its engineering projects. Heerema was responsible for several engineering breakthroughs during his career and expanded the number of ships at Allseas considerably. The project of an off shore platform decommissioning ship like Pioneering Spirit has been developed since 1987 and its building was initiated in 2011. The Pioneering Spirit finally took up work in 2016. In 2018, he unveiled plans to build an even larger ship called by now Amazing Grace which would be able to also decommission large off shore oil platforms with a tonnage of up to 72'000 metric tons.

=== Allseas scam trial ===
Edward Heerema was also targeted by the fraudster Paul Sultana, who persuaded him to agree to deliver £88m through Allseas, which would be placed in an investment which promised very high returns. Heerema initiated a private prosecution after the British courts initially refused to condemn Paul Sultana due to lack of evidence. Paul Sultana was sentenced to 8 years’ imprisonment in June 2018.

=== Controversies ===
He was the target of repeated criticism for naming the largest ship in the off shore oil business in memory of his father Pieter Schelte, offshore oil industry pioneer and member of the Waffen-SS during World War II At first he defended his decision as it was his company who developed and built the ship and he seemed to be convinced his father should be remembered in this way. But as he became aware what an impact it had for the victims of nazi actions, he agreed to rename it Pioneering Spirit.

== Awards ==
On April 12, 2016, he was awarded a Fellow Chartership of Engineer by the Royal Netherlands Society of Engineers (KIVI). Heerema was the first and only one at the time to have received this title in the Netherlands.
