= Allseas =

Subsea construction company

Allseas Group S.A.
- Type: Private
- Industry: offshore pipelaying subsea construction
- Founded: 1985; 41 years ago
- Founder: Edward Heerema
- Headquarters: Châtel-Saint-Denis, canton of Fribourg, Switzerland
- Number of employees: 5,000
- Website: www.allseas.com

Allseas Group S.A. is a Swiss offshore contractor specialising in pipelay, heavy lift and subsea construction. It was founded in 1985 by owner and chairman Edward Heerema, employs 5,000 people and operates worldwide.

The company is headquartered in Châtel-Saint-Denis, Switzerland. It also owns a subsidiary, Allseas Engineering B.V., based in the Netherlands with offices in Delft, Eindhoven and Enschede, which provide project management and engineering services to the group. The company also operates project and engineering offices out of Australia, Malaysia, Qatar, Brazil and the United States.

Allseas operates a versatile fleet of specialised heavy-lift, pipelay and subsea installation and construction vessels. The company has installed over 30,000 km of subsea pipeline worldwide using S-lay technology, with diameters ranging from 2 to 48 inches. Allseas launched its first vessel Lorelay, the world's first pipelay vessel to operate on full dynamic positioning, in 1986. It also owns Pioneering Spirit, the world's largest construction vessel, designed for the single-lift installation and removal of large oil and gas platforms and the installation of record-weight pipelines.

== History ==
Allseas was founded in January 1985 by Edward Heerema, son of the late Pieter Schelte Heerema, founder of the Dutch offshore construction and installation company Heerema Marine Contractors. Offices subsequently opened in The Hague, Netherlands and Châtel-Saint-Denis, Switzerland.

The company spent its early days developing the concept of dynamically positioned (DP) subsea pipelay. Allseas acquired the former bulk carrier Natalie Bolten in 1985 and converted it for DP pipelay at the Boele shipyard in Bolnes, the Netherlands. The vessel was christened Lorelay in Rotterdam on 26 April 1986. Lorelay immediately entered service and successfully executed her first pipelay contract, the 8-inch, 1.8-km Helder A-B pipeline, for Unocal in the Dutch sector of the North Sea.

In 2007, Allseas announced plans to build a twin-hulled platform installation/decommissioning and pipelay vessel. At 382 m long and 124 m wide, the vessel would be the largest ever built. It was to be named Pieter Schelte after the offshore pioneer Pieter Schelte Heerema, father of Allseas’ owner and founder Edward Heerema, however this naming caused controversy with some politicians and Jewish groups due to Pieter's previous service in the Waffen-SS during World War II, for which he was jailed for three years after the war. In February 2015, Allseas stated that the ship would be renamed Pioneering Spirit.

A criminal trial in the UK in 2016 revealed that Allseas was the victim of a multi-million-pound fraud. In 2011, they invested £73 million with investors led by Luis Nobre claiming to have links to the Vatican and Spanish nobility.

In 2018, Allseas announced its intention to build an even larger version of Pioneering Spirit, named Amazing Grace, which is scheduled to be delivered in 2022. However, in July 2020, Allseas announced that it would suspend the project indefinitely.

Allseas is developing systems to recover polymetallic nodules from the ocean floor. In 2022, the company conducted a pilot in which 4,500 tonnes of nodules were collected at a water depth of 4,500 meters.

In 2025, Allseas launched a plan for the development of a Small Modular Reactor (SMR) tailored for offshore vessels and onshore industrial clusters. The company aims to start production of the first SMR in 2030.

== Fleet ==
The company owns several vessels which are used for its offshore construction activities.

Ship	Notes
Alegria	An offshore supply vessel. It has dynamic positioning capabilities.
Audacia	A versatile pipelay vessel designed for the installation of small to large-diameter subsea pipelines. It is equipped with Dynamic Positioning System. Built-in 2005, it has been operational since 2007. It is registered and currently sailing under the flag of Malta. It has a length overall of 225 m and a gross tonnage of 56172.
Felicity	An offshore supply vessel. It has dynamic positioning capabilities.
Fortitude	A multipurpose offshore construction vessel. The vessel was built in 2015 at Hyundai yard in Korea for Toisa Group which had named in Toisa Patroklos. Allseas acquired it in 2018 and renamed the vessel Fortitude. It is expected that Fortitude will primarily work as an offshore support vessel for Pioneering Spirit.
Fortress	An offshore supply vessel. It has dynamic positioning capabilities.
Hidden Gem	A deep-sea mineral production vessel with seabed-to-surface nodule collection and transport systems.
Lorelay	A pipelay vessel designed for the installation of small to medium-diameter subsea pipelines. It was the first offshore pipelay vessel to be equipped with a full Dynamic Positioning System (DPS). It is registered and currently sailing under the flag of Malta. It has a length overall of 179 m and a gross tonnage of 21143 tons.
Oceanic	Designed for deep water construction and support activities. It can also operate in severe weather conditions such as arctic waters. It was acquired by Allseas from Volstad Shipping in December 2016.
Pioneering Spirit	The largest construction vessel in the world. It specializes in single lift installation or removal of offshore Oil & Gas platforms. It is also capable of installation of subsea pipelines with extremely high weight. It holds offshore lift record for the topside installation in Johan Sverdrup field, offshore Norway.
Sandpiper	Fully automated anchor-positioned pipelay barge for high-performance shallow water construction operations.
Solitaire	One of the largest construction vessels in the world focused on subsea pipeline installation. Its holding force of 1050 tons is catered towards medium and large diameter pipelines. In 2007, it set a record for ultra-deep water installation at a depth of 2775m in the Gulf of Mexico.
Tog Mor	A shallow water construction barge. It navigates using anchors with 10 point mooring system. Recently grounded in Mexico after tow wire broke. Considered total economic loss. Now sold to Hebo.
