= Offshore oil and gas in the United States =

Large portion of oil and gas supply

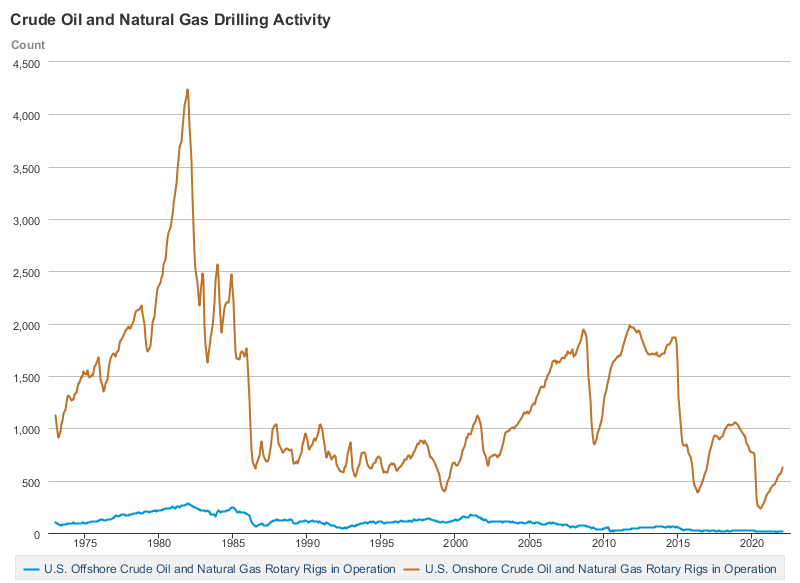
Number of onshore and offshore oil and natural gas drilling rigs from the 1970s to present Onshore oil rigs Offshore oil rigs

Offshore oil and gas in the United States provides a large portion of the nation’s oil and gas supply. Large oil and gas reservoirs are found under the sea offshore from Louisiana, Texas, California, and Alaska. Environmental concerns have prevented or restricted offshore drilling in some areas, and the issue has been hotly debated at the local and national levels.

== Production ==
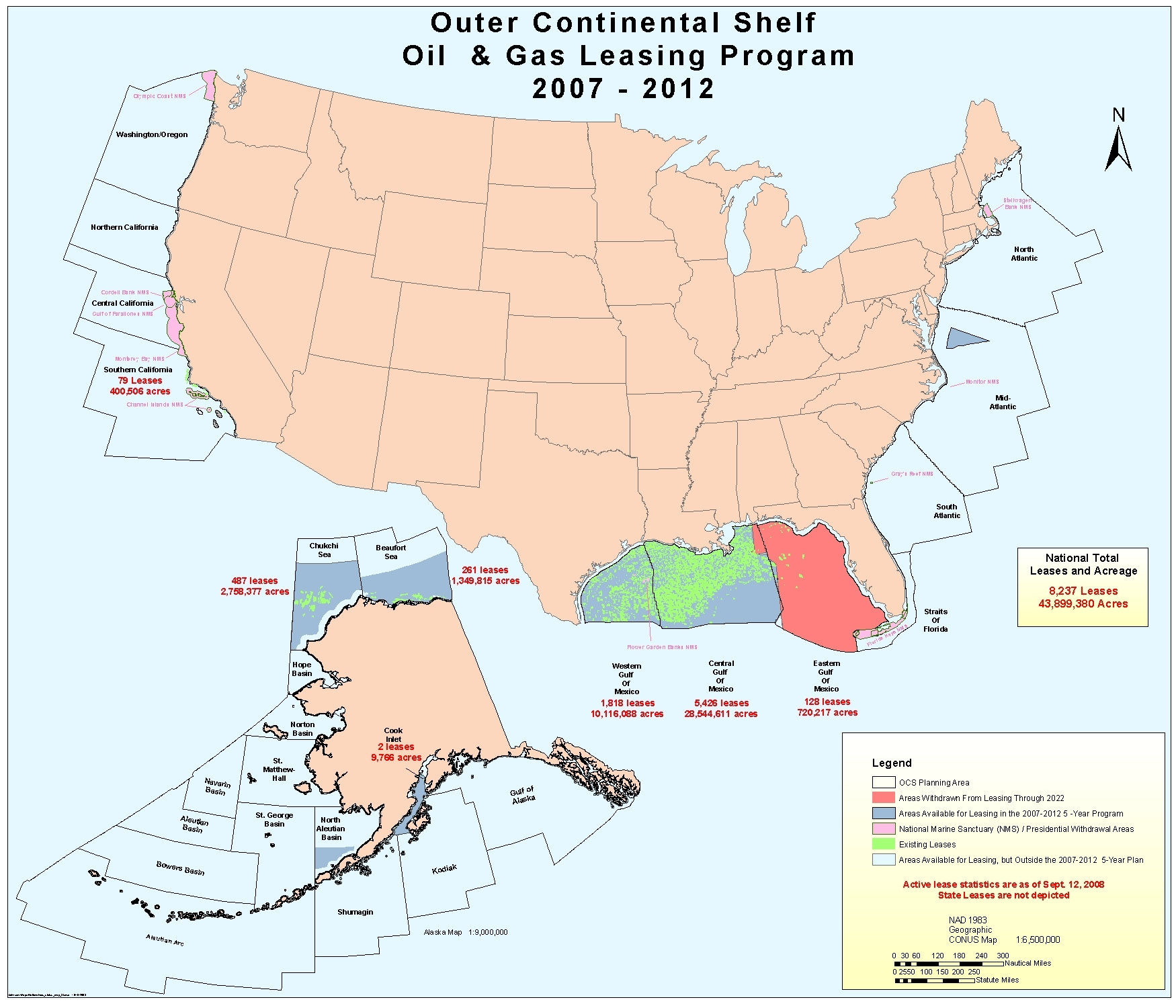
Federal leases in green; areas proposed open for leasing 2007-2012 in grey (Minerals Management Service)

From 1954 to 2023, federal offshore tracts produced 21.4 billion barrels (3.4×10^{9} m^{3}) of oil and 195 trillion cubic feet (5.5×10^{12} m^{3}) of natural gas.

In recent years, the Gulf of Mexico alone accounted for about 15% of all domestic oil production (14.5% in 2022) and 2% of domestic natural gas production. Despite some fluctuations due to new deep-water discoveries and technological advancements, offshore production continues to play a crucial role in the U.S. energy landscape.

In 2023, federal offshore tracts produced approximately 15% of the oil and 2% of the natural gas in the United States. The Gulf of Mexico remains a critical area for offshore production, housing several of the nation's largest oil fields. Notable fields include Mars-Ursa, Thunder Horse, and Atlantis, which continue to contribute significantly to the country's oil reserves.

The oil production in the offshore area owned by the federal government reached approximately 602 million barrels (96,000,000 m^{3}) in 2023, reflecting a significant recovery and surpassing previous records.

== Ownership of offshore oil and gas ==
The issue of state versus federal ownership has a long and contentious history (see Tidelands). The US Supreme Court ruled in 1947 that the federal government owned all the seabed off the California coast; the court applied the same doctrine against Louisiana and Texas in 1950. The court ruling invalidated existing state leases over producing offshore oil fields in the three states. However, the US Congress passed the Submerged Land Act in 1953, which recognized state ownership of the seabed within 3 nautical miles (5.6 km) of the shore. That same year Congress also passed the Outer Continental Shelf Act, which gave the federal government jurisdiction over minerals on and under the seabed farther offshore from state waters.

The first federal offshore lease sale was held in 1954, to offer oil production rights under federal seabed in offshore Louisiana.

=== State ownership ===
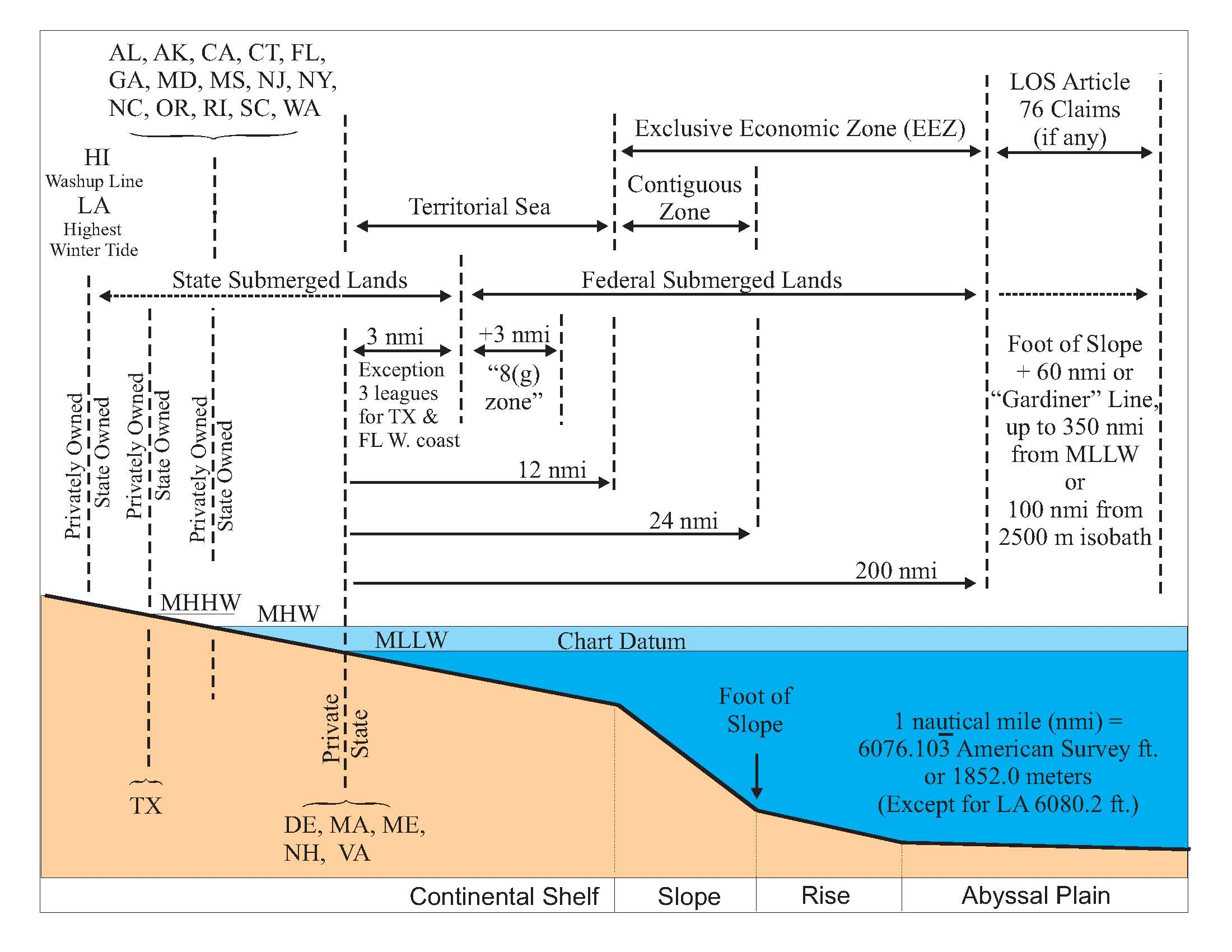
Diagram showing limits of state and federal ownership of the sea bed (Minerals Management Service)

Each coastal state owns the territory extending 3 nautical miles (5.6 km) from the shore at mean low tide, and has jurisdiction to decide whether or not, and under what terms, to lease the territory for oil and gas. Exceptions include Texas and the west coast of Florida, which for historical reasons own the seabed out to 9 nautical miles (16.7 km) from the shore. Louisiana is included in the 3 nautical mile rule, but because it had active offshore leases defined before 1950 (and before most other states), its territory is measured using the Admiralty Nautical Mile, while other states use the International Nautical Mile, adopted by the United States in 1954.

The exact definition of the shoreline, dividing state waters offshore and potential private land onshore, depends on state law. Shifting shorelines in the vicinity of oil fields have been a thorny issue. In the Goose Creek field along the coast in Harris County, Texas, so much oil was produced that the ground elevation sank ten or more feet, putting some privately owned oil-producing lands below sea level. The state of Texas then declared that the newly submerged land, along with its oil revenue, was state property.

=== Federal ownership ===
Traditionally, nations owned the territory extending 12 nautical miles (22 km) from shore. In 1945, President Harry Truman issued a proclamation extending US jurisdiction over mineral resources to the edge of the continental shelf; the proclamation was codified by Outer Continental Shelf Lands Act of 1953. The Geneva Convention on the continental shelf in 1958 recognized the right of each nation to the mineral resources on its adjacent continental shelf, out to a water depth of 200 meters. In 1983, President Ronald Reagan issued a proclamation extending the US Exclusive Economic Zone to 200 nautical miles (370 km) from the shore.

By virtue of the Law of the Sea, which the U.S. has signed but not ratified, each nation controls an Exclusive Economic Zone (EEZ) that extends 200 nautical miles (370 km) from its shore. The EEZ confers exclusive rights to a nation to explore and produce minerals, including oil and gas. In areas within 200 nautical miles of two or more nations, the territorial line is drawn equidistant from the shores of the two nations. The US and Canada referred a dispute over the EEZ boundary in the Atlantic Ocean to the International Court of Justice, which decided the matter (see Georges Bank). Article 76 of the Law of the Sea provides that nations may under certain circumstances extend their EEZs beyond the 200 nautical mile limit, to up to 350 nautical miles (648 km) from shore.

The 200 nautical mile EEZ left a small area in the western Gulf of Mexico enclosed by the EEZs of the United States and Mexico, but outside the EEZ of either nation (the "doughnut hole"). The US and Mexico concluded a treaty to divide the area between them. A second, and as yet unresolved "doughnut hole" exists in the eastern Gulf of Mexico, bordered by the EEZs of the US, Mexico, and Cuba.

Leasing and drilling on federal offshore seabed is controlled by the Bureau of Ocean Energy Management (BOEM), and the Bureau of Safety and Environmental Enforcement (BSEE), formerly named the Minerals Management Service (MMS). The BOEM issues leases through competitive bidding by sealed bids. The oil and gas company offering the highest up-front payment to the government (called a bonus) wins the lease. The government also receives a fixed annual rental based on the area for non-producing leases, and a percentage of the market value of any oil or gas produced and sold (royalty). The leases expire after a set number of years, or continue however long afterward that oil and gas are continually produced from the lease. Individual tracts are generally 9 square miles (23 km^{2}). Current leases being offered in the Gulf of Mexico have 5-year terms for tracts in water depths of less than 400 m, and 8 years for tracts in water greater than 400 m. Royalty rates are 18.75% regardless of water depth. From 1954 through 2004, the federal government received $64 billion in bonuses, $3 billion in rentals, $89 billion in royalties, and $3 billion in taken-in-kind oil deliveries in lieu of royalties.

=== International ownership ===
Some potential petroleum deposits underlie areas outside the EEZ. For example, the North Chuckchi Basin in the Arctic Ocean is partly inside and partly outside the US EEZ.

== Offshore drilling by area ==
Historically, offshore drilling began by extending known coastal oil- and gas-producing trends out into the ocean. For this reason, most US offshore drilling has taken place offshore Louisiana, Texas, California, and Alaska, areas with coastal onshore oil and gas fields.

"Possibly in some future age, when all known petroleum fields shall have been drained of their richness, oil men may seek refuge in King Neptune's realm."

- Oil & Gas Journal, 24 June 1915

=== Alaska ===
The first federal lease sale offshore Alaska was held in 1976. Alaska produces oil and gas from offshore areas in the Cook Inlet and the Arctic Ocean. Endicott Island is an artificial island built to produce oil from beneath the Beaufort Sea. There are currently four artificial islands being used for drilling.

By Executive Order dated April 28, 2017, the Bureau of Ocean Energy Management will begin selling offshore leases in 2019.

=== California ===
Offshore drilling began in California in 1896, when operators in the Summerland Oil Field in Santa Barbara County followed the field into the ocean by drilling from piers built out over the ocean.

Leasing California state seabed is controlled by the State Lands Commission, which halted further leasing of state offshore tracts after the Santa Barbara oil spill in 1969. In 1994 the California legislature codified the ban on new leases by passing the California Coastal Sanctuary Act, which prohibited new leasing of state offshore tracts. The federal government has had no new lease sales for offshore California since 1982. Offshore drilling has continued from existing platforms in state and federal waters.

State offshore seabed in California produced 37,400 barrels (5,950 m^{3}) of oil per day, and federal offshore tracts produced 66,400 barrels (10,560 m^{3}) of oil per day in November 2008. State and federal offshore tracts together made up 16% of the state's oil production. Notable offshore fields include the Ellwood Oil Field, which is partially onshore and partially offshore, and the Dos Cuadras Field, source of the 1969 spill, which is entirely within the federal zone.

=== Gulf of Mexico ===
See Offshore oil and gas in the US Gulf of Mexico

The western and central Gulf of Mexico, which includes offshore Texas, Louisiana, Mississippi, and Alabama, is one of the major petroleum-producing areas of the United States. In 2007, federal leases in the western and central Gulf of Mexico produced 25% of the nation's oil and 14% of the nation's natural gas. In 2008, federal leases in the Gulf of Mexico produced 418 million barrels (66,500,000 m^{3}) of oil, down from 568 million barrels (90,300,000 m^{3}) in 2002; however, due to new deep-water discoveries, the MMS projects that oil production from the Gulf of Mexico will increase to 686 million barrels (109,100,000 m^{3}) per year by 2013.

Major fields include Atlantis Oil Field, and the Tiber oilfield (discovered 2009) and others in the Keathley Canyon protraction area. Notable oil platforms include Baldpate, Bullwinkle, Mad Dog, Magnolia, Mars, Petronius, and Thunder Horse. Notable individual wells include Jack 2 and Knotty Head.

The eastern Gulf of Mexico, which includes offshore Gulf Coast Florida, has never been a petroleum-producing area due to federal and state restrictions on exploration. Offshore platforms currently exist as far east as to near the Florida-Alabama border.

=== East Coast ===
In the late 1970s and early 1980s oil companies drilled 51 exploratory wells on federal leases on the outer continental shelf of the Atlantic coast. All the leases have now reverted to the government. A 1996 study by the MMS estimated undiscovered conventionally recoverable resources in Atlantic federal waters to be 7.2 billion barrels (1.1×10^{9} m^{3}) of oil and 27.5 trillion cubic feet (7.8×10^{11} m^{3}) gas.

=== Pacific Northwest Coast ===
The Sunshine Mining Co. made Washington state’s first oil discovery in July 1957, at a location 1.4 miles south down the coast from Ocean City. The discovery was on a state lease, and was below mean high tide, which made it an offshore well. Additional wells were drilled in the area, but none produced any oil. The discovery well made 11,032 barrels of oil before it was plugged in 1959.

In 1964, the federal government leased tracts totaling 581,000 acres (2,400 km^{2}) in offshore Oregon and Washington. Oil companies drilled six tests offshore Washington (three in state waters and three in federal waters) and seven tests in federal waters offshore Oregon. The OCS P-0130 well drilled offshore Oregon by Union Oil in 1966 was described as having "potential for commercial gas production", but none of the wells were completed as producers, and the federal leases expired in 1969.

Farther north, in Canadian waters, Shell Canada drilled 14 wells offshore from Vancouver Island from 1967-1969. None were successful. Canada has had a federal moratorium on offshore drilling on its west coast since 1972.

=== Great Lakes ===
The lakebeds under the US portion of the Great Lakes are owned by the adjacent states. The only state that has allowed oil and gas drilling beneath the Great Lakes in recent years has been Michigan, and that only by directional drilling from onshore surface locations. All oil and gas drilling, either on or directionally beneath the Great Lakes, has been banned by federal law since 2002.

The Canadian side of Lake Erie has 480 producing gas wells in the lake. Gas production in Canadian Lake Erie waters dates back to 1913; more than 2000 wells have been drilled to the Clinton Sand, up to a few miles from the US side of the lake; the same formation produces gas from many onshore wells on the US side, but there are no wells in the US portion of the lake. The province of Ontario, where the offshore wells are located, allows gas wells, but not oil wells, in offshore Lake Erie. Ontario allows oil production from below the lake only from wells drilled directionally from onshore surface locations; a number of such directional wells are producing oil from beneath Lake Erie in the Goldsmith/Lakeshore Field.

A gas well to the Medina Group was drilled in 1958 in Pennsylvania state waters in Lake Erie.

The only state that has current oil and gas production from beneath the Great Lakes is Michigan. Michigan has 13 oil and gas wells that produce from below Lake Michigan, all drilled directionally from surface locations on shore. Directional drilling beneath the Great Lakes is now banned.

The US Geological Survey has estimated that 430 million barrels (68,000,000 m^{3}) of recoverable petroleum liquids and 5.2 trillion cubic feet (1.5×10^{11} m^{3}) of recoverable natural gas underlie the US portion of the Great Lakes. Petroleum potential was given to all of the lakes except Lake Superior. The majority of the natural gas (3.0 TCF) is thought to underlie Lake Erie.

== Restrictions on offshore drilling ==
=== State restrictions ===
A number of states, including California and Florida, have banned leasing of state waters for oil and gas drilling. In 2009 a bill that would have partially rescinded a ban on oil and gas leasing of Florida state waters failed in the Florida statehouse (see Offshore oil and gas in Florida).

In 2018, New Jersey enacted a law to ban oil and gas drilling in state waters and prohibit any constructions of oil and gas drilling infrastructure and facilities including pipelines and docks in New Jersey and its waters. This is an effort to cut off infrastructure to make it harder to drill in federal waters. New York, California, South Carolina and Rhode Island introduced similar bills in their states.

=== Federal restrictions ===
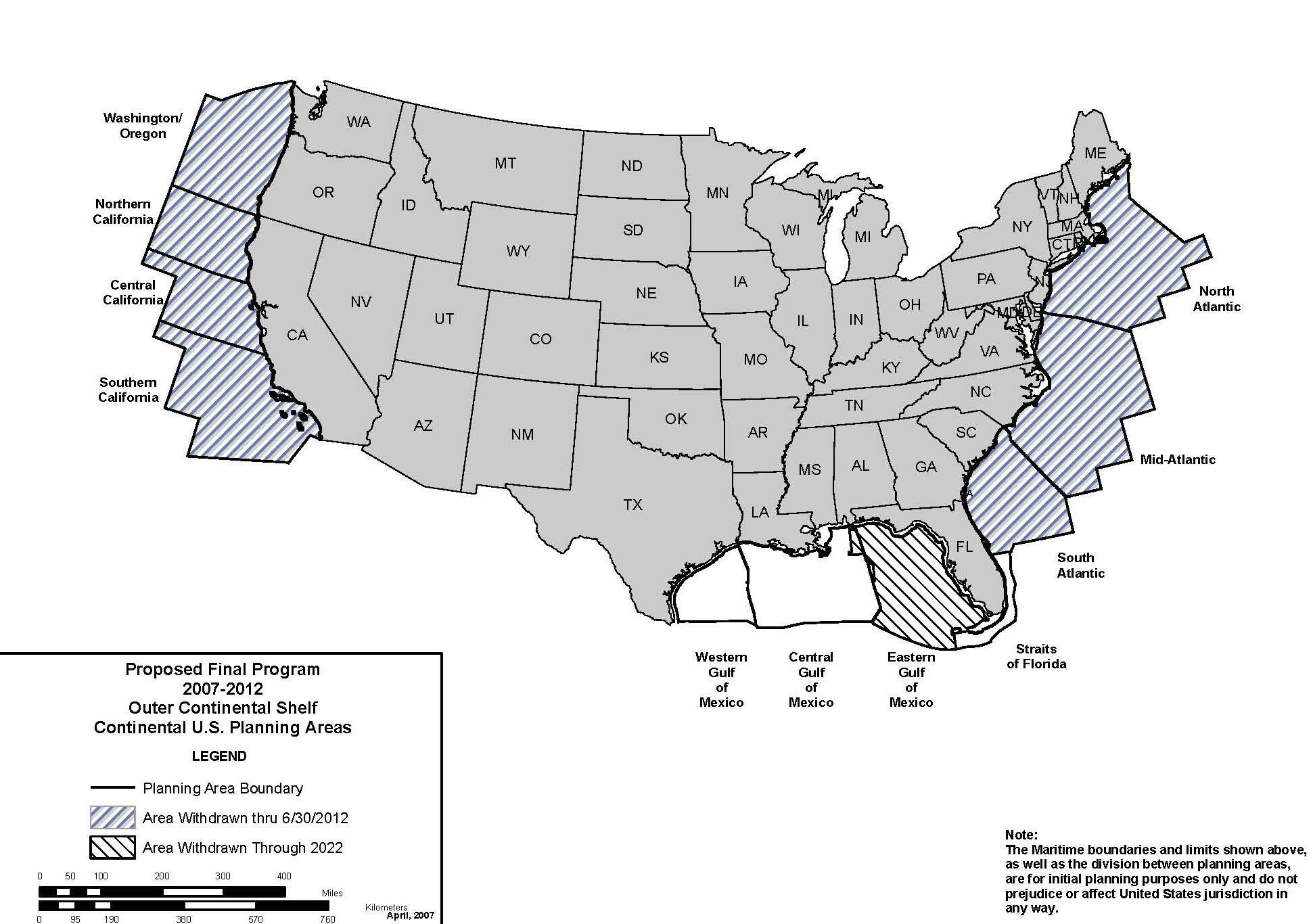
Areas withdrawn from oil and gas leasing as of 2007

Congress passed the Marine Protection, Research, and Sanctuaries Act of 1972, which provided for the establishment of National Marine Sanctuaries, in which certain activities, including oil and gas drilling, are prohibited. To date, 13 sanctuaries with a combined area of 150,000 square miles (390,000 km^{2}) have been so designated.

In 1982, the US Congress directed that no federal funds be used to lease federal tracts off the coasts of Washington, Oregon, or central and northern California. Over the years Congress added other areas until the prohibited area included all the east and west coasts, and the eastern Gulf of Mexico. Congress repeated the effective ban on offshore drilling in these areas every year until September 2008, when an appropriations bill passed the House and Senate without the ban.

In 1990, Congress passed the North Carolina Outer Banks Protection Act, prohibiting leasing and drilling on federal seabed offshore from North Carolina.

In 1990, President George H. W. Bush issued an executive moratorium restricting federal offshore leasing to Texas, Louisiana, Mississippi, Alabama, and parts of Alaska. The moratorium banned federal leasing through the year 2000 off the East Coast, West Coast, the eastern Gulf of Mexico (offshore Florida Gulf Coast), and the Northern Aleutian Basin of Alaska. In 1998, President Bill Clinton extended the moratorium through 2012. In July 2008, President George W. Bush rescinded the executive order.

In 2002, Congress imposed a moratorium on drilling on or directionally beneath the Great Lakes. The ban was made permanent by the Energy Policy Act of 2005.

Part of the central and most of the eastern Gulf of Mexico was declared off-limits to oil and gas leasing until 2022 by the Gulf of Mexico Energy Security Act of 2006.

In 2020, President Donald Trump signed an executive order extending the moratorium on oil and gas leasing off Florida's Gulf and east coasts through 2032. However, in late 2025, Interior Secretary Doug Burgum announced a five-year offshore drilling plan that included new oil drilling off the Florida and California coasts. In response, Florida's entire congressional delegation, led by Senators Rick Scott and Ashley Moody along with all 28 House members from the state, sent a letter to Trump urging him to uphold the existing moratorium, citing risks to the state's tourism industry and military operations.

== Other mineral resources ==
Offshore areas of the US may contain resources of sulfur, salt, sand and gravel, phosphate rock, manganese nodules, and heavy-mineral placer deposits. To date, none of these has been produced for commercial purposes except sulfur and salt in the Gulf of Mexico, and gold in Alaskan state waters near Nome. The MMS has allowed sand dredging in federal waters to restore damaged beaches in Maryland, Virginia, South Carolina, and Florida. Formerly, very large gold dredges existed for many years, mining off of Nome, Alaska. The state lease auctions for up to the three mile limit are still held infrequently.

From 1960 to 2000, sulfur was mined by the Frasch process from the caprock of a salt dome at the Main Pass 299 mine, offshore Louisiana. A total of 34 million short tons of sulfur were recovered before the mine was closed; salt was also recovered.

== See also ==
- Off shore oil drilling
- Oil platform
- US offshore drilling debate
