= Atlantis PQ =

Oil platform

History
- Name: Atlantis
- Owner: BP
- Operator: BP (56%); BHP (44%)
- Port of registry: United States
- Builder: Daewoo Shipbuilding & Marine Engineering; Okpo, South Korea
- Laid down: 21 June 2004
- Launched: 17 August 2007
- Acquired: 17 August 2007
- Maiden voyage: August 2006
- In service: October 2007
- Identification: ABS class no: 07113220; Call sign: WPYW299; IMO number: 9265768
- Status: Operational at 27.195278°N 90.026944°W

General characteristics
- Class & type: ABS: A1, floating offshore installation
- Tonnage: 35,663 GT 88,826 DWT
- Length: 129.07 m (423.5 ft)
- Beam: 116.1 m (381 ft)
- Draught: 26 m (85 ft)
- Depth: 52 m (171 ft)
- Capacity: Diesel oil: 48.3 m^{3} (1,710 cu ft); Freshwater: 12.6 m^{3} (440 cu ft); Fuel oil: 2,046.2 m^{3} (72,260 cu ft); Ballast tank: 38,219 m^{3} (1,349,700 cu ft); Other: 377.9 m^{3} (13,350 cu ft)
- Crew: 60 berths

Atlantis PQ is a BP and BHP joint venture semi-submersible oil platform on permanent location over the Green Canyon Atlantis Oil Field in deepwater Gulf of Mexico, 190 mi (310 km) south of New Orleans. The "PQ" identifies the platform as being a production facility with crew quarters.

The vessel's hull was designed by GVA and built by Daewoo Shipbuilding & Marine Engineering (DSME) in Okpo, South Korea. Its topsides modules were built in Morgan City, Louisiana with hull integration in Ingleside, Texas.

Operating in depths of more than 2,100 metres (6,900 ft), Atlantis was the deepest moored semi-submersible platform in the world when it was installed.

== Food & Water Watch lawsuit ==
As a result of the 2010 explosion of the semi-submersible Deepwater Horizon drilling rig and the subsequent oil spill, informants within BP came forward with allegations that safety practices at Atlantis PQ were flawed. Specifically, allegations have been laid against the plans and specs used in its construction, maintenance, and operation. Kenneth Abbott, a former BP contractor, reported that up to 89 percent of the engineering plans used to build and operate the installations were never authenticated by even BP engineers for safety and stability, and that over 95 percent of the plans for the underwater welds were never verified. Food & Water Watch, a US-based consumer interest group, filed a complaint with the US district court requesting an injunction to stop production on Atlantis PQ until these matters have been investigated.

In August 2014, the case against BP Atlantis was dismissed by a U.S. circuit court. U.S. District Judge Lynn N. Hughes stated "BP never misrepresented -- much less knowingly distorted what it was doing", finding that the case was ultimately about "paperwork wrinkles" instead of engineering shortcuts, adding [Abbott and the environmentalists] "have not blown a whistle," he said. "They have blown their own horn."

== See also ==
- Offshore oil and gas in the US Gulf of Mexico
- Oil fields operated by BP
