= Offshore drilling on the Atlantic coast of the United States =

Offshore drilling for oil and gas on the Atlantic coast of the United States took place from 1947 to the early 1980s. Oil companies drilled five wells in Atlantic Florida state waters and 51 exploratory wells on federal leases on the outer continental shelf of the Atlantic coast. None of the wells were completed as producing wells. All the leases have now reverted to the government.

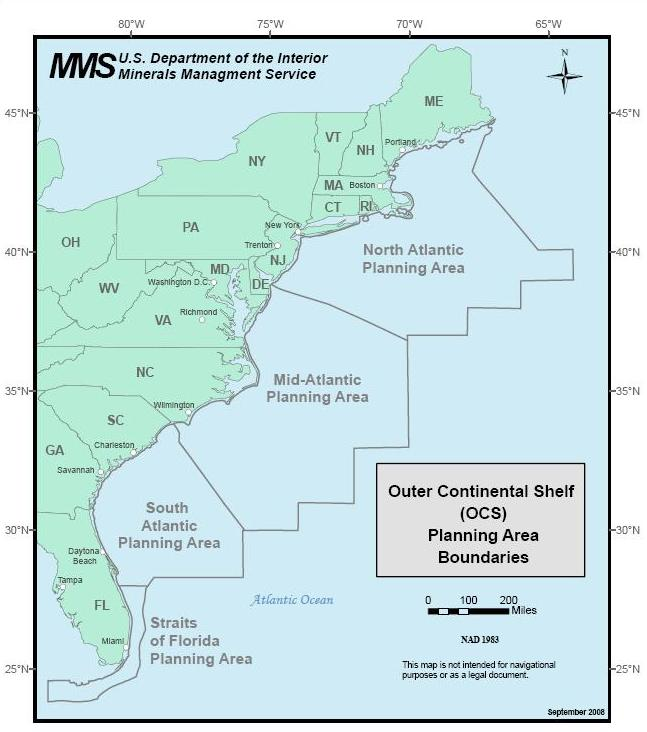
U.S. Atlantic coast federal offshore areas (Minerals Management Service)

Although no oil or gas have been produced from beneath U.S. Atlantic waters, there are active offshore fields to the south in offshore Cuba and to the north in offshore Canada.

Each US state along the Atlantic coast owns as territorial waters out to three nautical miles (3.45 statute, or land miles) from the shore at mean low tide, and has jurisdiction to decide whether or not, and under what terms, to lease the territory for oil and gas. The federal government owns and controls the minerals between three and 200 nautical miles (370 km) from the shore.

In accordance with congressional restrictions and presidential orders, no federal leasing has taken place on the offshore Atlantic coast of the United States since the early 1980s. The federal government had scheduled a lease sale for offshore Virginia, to take place in 2011, and in March 2010, President Barack Obama announced his intention to open the Mid-Atlantic and South Atlantic planning areas to oil and gas exploration. However, lease sale plans were canceled in May 2010 following the Deepwater Horizon oil spill in the Gulf of Mexico. In December 2010, Interior Secretary Ken Salazar announced a ban on drilling in federal waters off the Atlantic coast through 2017. In 2017 President Trump issued an executive order aimed to open and streamline oil exploration on the Atlantic coast and elsewhere, stating that "It shall be the policy of the United States to encourage energy exploration and production".

== Reserves ==
No oil or gas has been produced from the U.S. Atlantic continental shelf. Some gas discoveries were made by Tenneco, Texaco, and Exxon in shallow waters off New Jersey, but these were judged uneconomic at the time, and were never produced.

A 2012 study by the Bureau of Ocean Energy Management (BOEM) (part of the U.S. Department of the Interior) estimated undiscovered technically recoverable oil and gas resources in Atlantic federal waters to be 3.30 billion barrels of oil (Bbo) and 31.28 trillion cubic feet (Tcf) of gas. This represents approximately 4% of the total estimated recoverable oil resources and 8% of the total estimated recoverable gas resources in U.S. federal waters.

== Straits of Florida ==
Five wells were drilled in Florida state waters in the Straits of Florida (in waters off the Florida Keys) from 1946 to 1962. Gulf Oil operated three wells in state waters south of the Florida Keys in 1959, 1960 and 1961, while Chevron (Calco) and Sinclair each operated one. The wells were considered to be dry holes, however, oil shows were found in all the wells and live oil was tested in the State Lease 826Y-1.

The boundary between the Exclusive Economic Zones of the U.S. and Cuba is halfway between Cuba and Florida, as determined by a 1977 Modus vivendi between the U.S. and Cuba.

=== Offshore Cuba ===
Cuba has three producing offshore oil fields within 5 km of its north coast opposite Florida. The US Geological Survey estimates that the North Cuba Basin contains 5.5 billion barrels (870,000,000 m^{3}) of undiscovered petroleum liquids and 9.8 trillion cubic feet of natural gas, almost all in the offshore part of the basin.

The issue of allowing oil and gas exploration offshore Florida became a hotly contested topic in the 2008 US elections. In a column published 5 June 2008, syndicated columnist George Will wrote that a Chinese oil company was then drilling in Cuban waters 60 miles (97 km) from the Florida coast, a claim that was repeated by candidates in favor of offshore drilling. George Will later acknowledged that no drilling was then taking place in that part of Cuban waters.

In 2004 the Spanish oil company Repsol-YPF drilled in deep Cuban waters between Cuba and the Florida Keys, and found an oil deposit; the deposit was judged noncommercial, and the hole was plugged. Repsol returned in 2012 to drill three more dry holes in deepwater locations in partnership with the Norwegian company Statoil, then halted further attempts.

In October 2008, Cuba signed an agreement with the Brazilian state oil company Petrobras, which provides for Petrobras to drill for oil and gas in deep waters off the north shore of Cuba. Petrobras obtained poor drilling results, and pulled out in March 2011.

In July 2009, Cuba signed an agreement with the Russian government giving the Russian oil company Zarubezhneft oil exploration rights in shallower waters closer to the north shore of Cuba. Zarubezhneft secured a shallow waster drilling rig and moved it to Cuba in late 2012. Zarubezhneft also failed to find new oil deposits, and announced in May 2013 that they were halting further drilling and releasing the rig. Cuban officials said that they expected Zarubezhneft to return to drilling in 2014.

=== Offshore Bahamas ===
In 2009 the Falkland Islands-registered company BPC Limited and Norwegian company Statoil announced a joint venture to drill for oil in Bahamian waters north of Cuba and southeast of Florida. The government of the Bahamas has indicated that applications for offshore drilling are on hold pending negotiations with Cuba, the United States, and the Turks and Caicos Islands on the exact boundaries between their respective Exclusive Economic Zones.

== Southern Atlantic coast ==
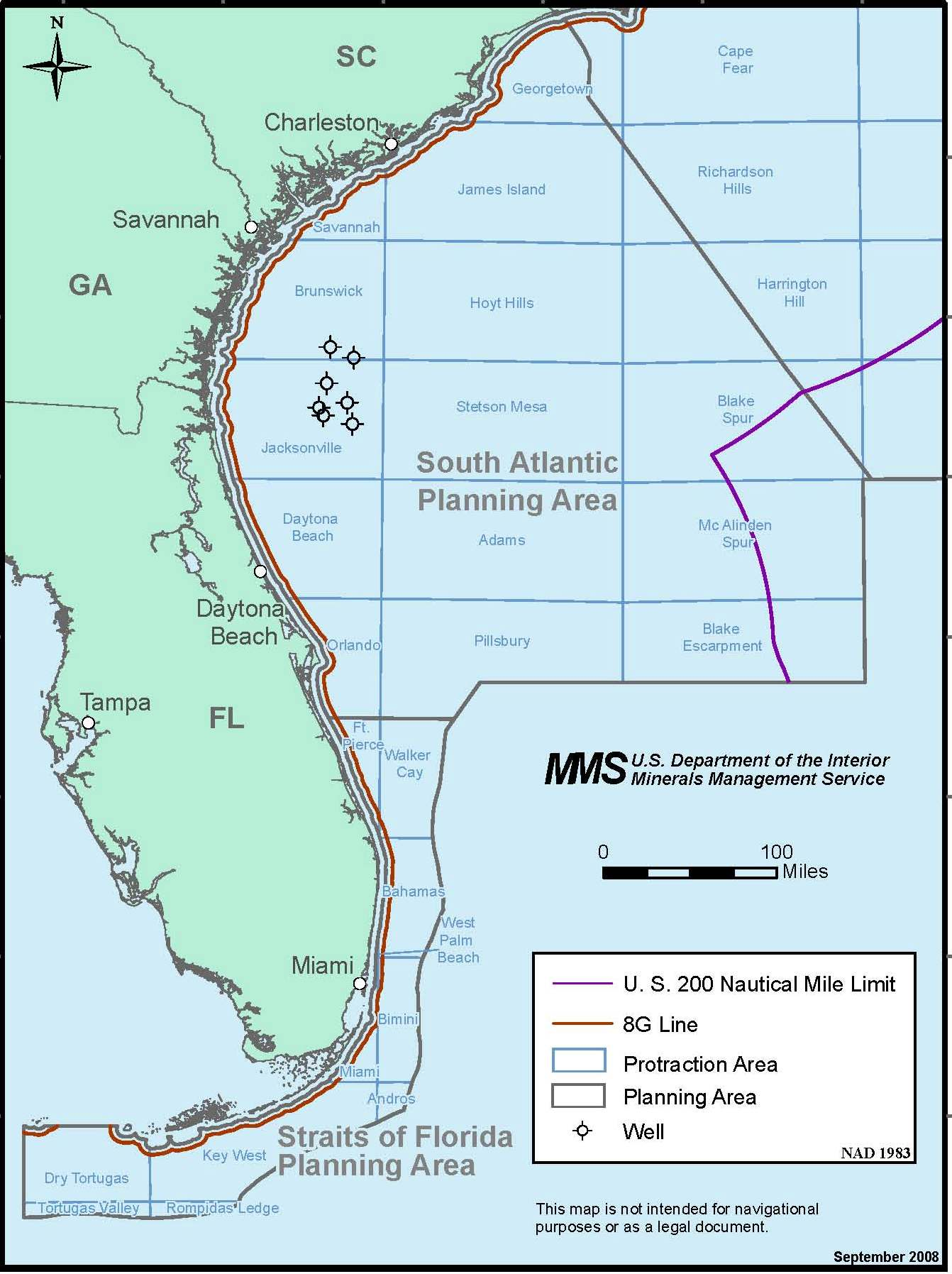
Wells drilled off the south Atlantic coast (Minerals Management Service)

The first lease sale in the Southeast Georgia Embayment off the coast of Georgia and Florida was held in 1978. Oil companies drilled seven wells, all dry holes.

When President Biden took office in January 2021, he issued an executive order halting new oil and gas leases across federal lands and waters, but a federal judge in Louisiana immediately struck it down. The government then put up over 80 million acres of the Gulf of Mexico at auction, and companies bid on the right to drill in over 1.7 million offshore acres. In January 2022, however, a federal judge ruled that the Department of the Interior had underestimated the effects on climate and that the drilling could not proceed.

== Middle Atlantic coast ==
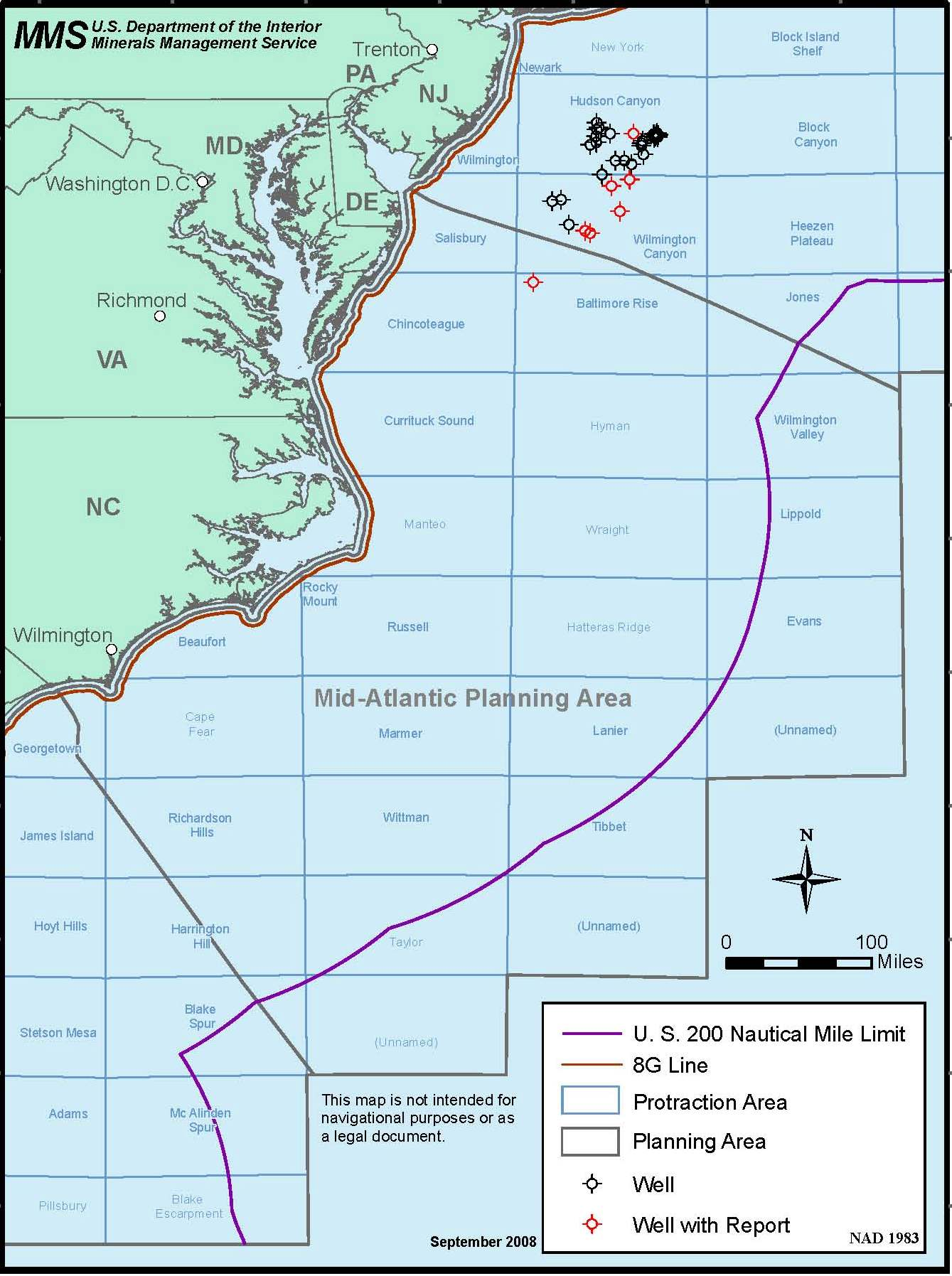
Wells drilled off the middle Atlantic coast (Minerals Management Service)

A number of oil companies bought federal leases offshore North Carolina, but in 1990 the U.S. Secretary of Commerce denied Mobil Oil permission to drill after Congress passed the federal North Carolina Outer Banks Protection Act, prohibiting leasing and drilling on federal seabed offshore from North Carolina. Mobil and Marathon Oil sued the federal government to recover money paid for the leases.

In June 2000, the U.S. Supreme Court ruled for the oil companies in the Mobil Oil Exploration & Producing Southeast, Inc. v. United States, 530 U.S. 604 (2000), and ordered the federal government to repay $158 million. The government paid, and the companies relinquished the leases.

== North Atlantic coast ==
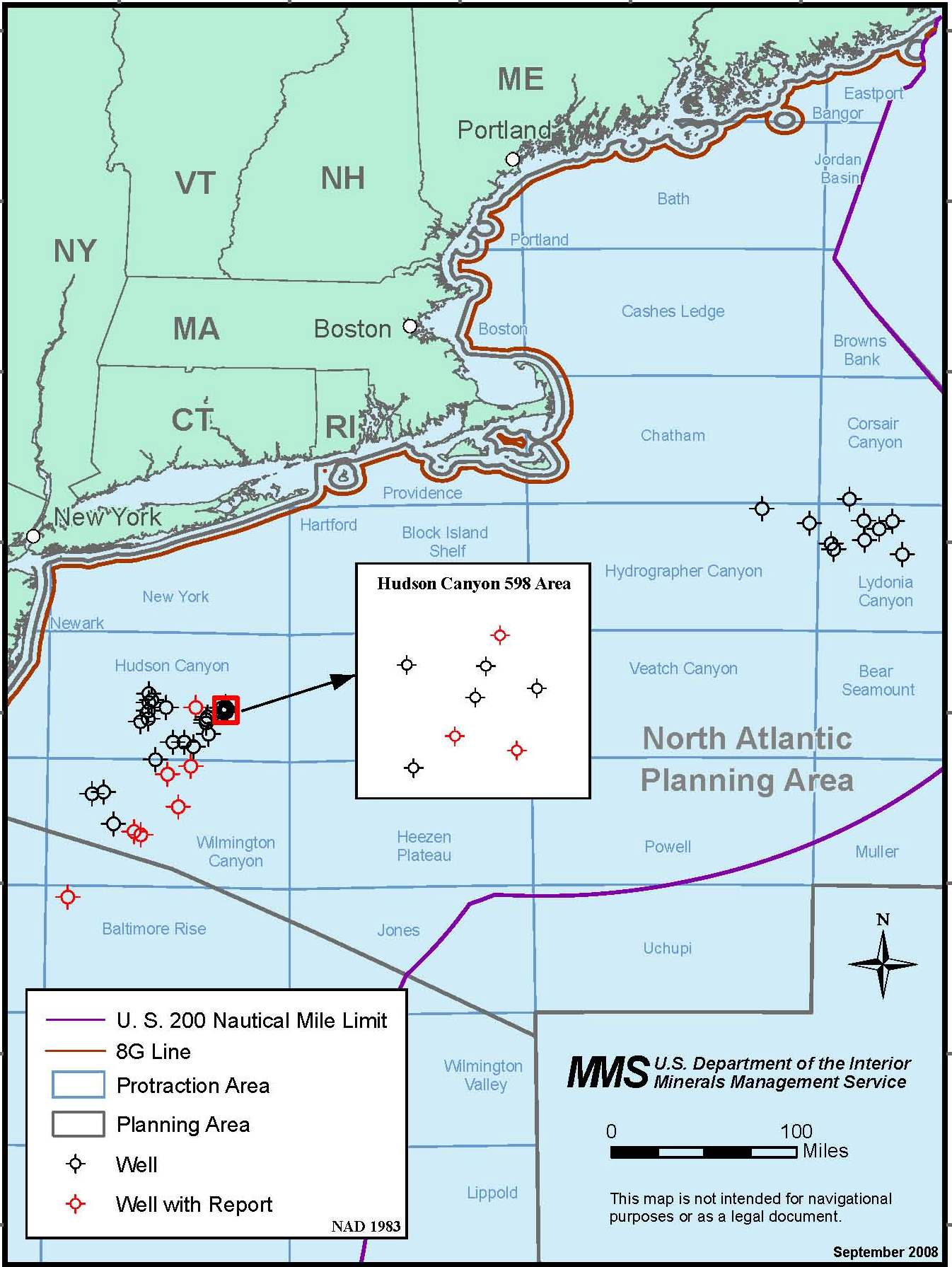
Wells drilled off the north Atlantic coast (Minerals Management Service)

About 30 wells explored the Baltimore Canyon Trough, about 100 miles (160 km) off the coast of New Jersey, Maryland, and Virginia. In one area, five wells tested significant flows of gas from Jurassic rocks, at rates as high as 18.9 million cubic feet per day. A 3-dimensional seismic survey was made over the area, but, in part due to falling gas prices in the 1980s, the lessee oil companies concluded that the tracts were uneconomic. The last leases were relinquished in 1984. In 2022, the Baltimore Canyon Offshore area was identified by researchers as a "carbon bomb," with the potential to produce 1.2 gigatons of CO_{2} emissions if its reserves were extracted and burnt.

From 1976 though 1982, oil companies drilled ten exploratory wells in the U.S. portion of the Georges Bank Basin, about 120 miles (190 km) off the coast of Massachusetts. The deepest well had a total depth of 21,874 feet (6,667 m). None were successful.

=== Offshore Atlantic Canada ===
The Canadian federal government and the province of Nova Scotia have jointly imposed a moratorium until 2015 on drilling in the Canadian portion of the Georges Bank.

Drilling has taken place in offshore Atlantic Canada since 1967. Gas was discovered on the Sable Offshore Energy Project (SOEP) offshore Nova Scotia in 1971, began producing natural gas in 2000, and is still producing. A second natural gas field offshore Nova Scotia is expected to start delivering gas in 2010. Gas production required the construction of an undersea, offshore pipeline to link the production wells with gas markets. SOEP is owned by ExxonMobil Canada Limited (50.8%), Shell Canada Limited (31.3%), Imperial Oil Limited (9.0%), Pengrowth (8.4%) and Moshbacher Operating Limited (0.5%). The Sable Project produces between 400 and 500 million cubic feet of natural gas and 20,000 barrels (3,200 m^{3}) of natural gas liquids every day.

Farther northeast, major oil deposits have been discovered and are being produced in the Jeanne d'Arc Basin, offshore Newfoundland. Offshore Newfoundland held 38% of Canada's conventional petroleum reserves (excluding oil sands) at the end of 2011.

== Future lease sales ==
The Obama administration announced in March 2010 that it intended to open oil and gas leasing in the Mid-Atlantic and South Atlantic planning areas. However, in May 2010, following the Deepwater Horizon oil spill, the administration cancelled the only scheduled Atlantic lease sale, for an area offshore Virginia. On December 1, 2010, the Obama Administration closed Atlantic and eastern Gulf areas to drilling.

=== Offshore Virginia ===
Commercial oil and gas drilling has never occurred offshore Virginia. Unlike the offshore drilling in the Gulf of Mexico, which occurs in both state and federal waters, the proposed offshore Virginia drilling would be exclusively in Federal waters more than 50 miles (80 km) from the coast, and the state has not leased its state waters for drilling. A second difference is that although federal law has been amended to share royalties in federal waters in the Gulf between the federal government and the adjacent state, all royalty revenues from any offshore drilling in federal Atlantic waters is not shared with the states.

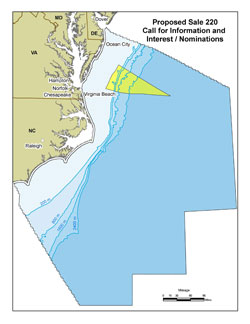
Federal lease sale proposed for 2011 for offshore Virginia (Minerals Management Service)

Under the 5-year offshore leasing plan for 2007–2012, the MMS scheduled a lease sale for tracts 50 miles (80 km) or more off the coast of Virginia, to take place in 2011. Five companies applied to the MMS to conduct seismic exploration surveys off the U.S. Atlantic coast. The MMS requested funding for an Environmental Impact Statement to decide whether of not to allow the proposed seismic surveys.

The possible offshore lease sale became an issue in the 2009 race for governor of Virginia. The winner, Bob McDonnell, urged during his tenure that the sale take place.

In May 2010, President Obama announced his decision to cancel the offshore Virginia lease sale, in response to the Deepwater Horizon oil spill in the Gulf of Mexico. Obama had previously supported the lease sale.

== See also ==
- Offshore oil and gas in the United States
- United States offshore drilling debate
- Offshore Energy and Jobs Act - bill introduced in Congress to expand offshore drilling in the Atlantic
