= Automsoft =

- Type: Privately held company
- Industry: Software
- Founded: 1997; 29 years ago
- Founders: Paraic O’Toole and Tony Prylowski
- Headquarters: Dublin, Ireland
- Area served: Worldwide
- Products: Process data platform, data visualization, process data capture
- Number of employees: 44 (2024)
- Website: www.automsoft.com

Automsoft is an Irish company that provides database historian and data visualization software for the process industries. Founded in 1997, Automsoft has headquarters in Dublin, Ireland and the UK and US.

Automsoft's primary focus is on database scalability based on object database technology and open standards. The company is privately owned, with no external investors.

== History ==
Founded in 1997, Automsoft sought to address a gap in the market process data historian market by writing a product using object database technology OODBMS. Automsoft joins the OPC Foundation as a charter member.

2000 Automsoft adds FDA 21 CFR Part 11 compliance to their suite of products.

In 2001, Automsoft achieves ISO 9001 quality management certification.

In 2002, Automsoft secured €6 million in funding from IDG Ventures Europe with Pentech Ventures and also won technical innovation award at Ireland's leading technology event for its RAPID Pharma product for the pharmaceutical market.

In 2003, Automsoft secured a contract with US biotech giant Genzyme Corporation and ex-Elan Corporation CEO Donal Geaney to chair Automsoft.

In 2005, Automsoft rapidHistorian software was used to find out what happened to oil platform Thunder Horse after Hurricane Dennis hit.

In 2005 and 2006, Automsoft secured patents on its database technology.

In 2009, Automsoft showcased their green innovations in clean-tech in Palo Alto California and also achieved OPC Unified Architecture compliance.

In 2011, Automsoft and Power Analytics announce a partnership to provide solutions for the smart grid environment.

In 2013, Automsoft was chosen as a 2013 Red Herring Top 100 Europe Winner.
