= Offshore Energy and Jobs Act =

- Long title: To amend the Outer Continental Shelf Lands Act to increase energy exploration and production on the Outer Continental Shelf, provide for equitable revenue sharing for all coastal States, implement the reorganization of the functions of the former Minerals Management Service into distinct and separate agencies, and for other purposes.
- Announced in: the 113th United States Congress
- Sponsored by: Rep. Doc Hastings (R, WA-4)
- Number of co-sponsors: 6

Codification
- Acts affected: Ethics in Government Act of 1978, Federal Advisory Committee Act, Federal Land Policy and Management Act of 1976, Gulf of Mexico Energy Security Act of 2006, Mineral Leasing Act, National Environmental Policy Act of 1969, National Forest Management Act of 1976, Outer Continental Shelf Lands Act, Surface Mining Control and Reclamation Act
- U.S.C. sections affected: 43 U.S.C. § 1344(a), 43 U.S.C. § 1344(b), 43 U.S.C. § 1344, 43 U.S.C. § 1344(d)(3), 33 U.S.C. § 1331 et seq., 43 U.S.C. § 1341(d), 43 U.S.C. § 1701 et seq., 30 U.S.C. § 181 et seq., 30 U.S.C. § 1201 et seq., 5 U.S.C. § 5316, 43 U.S.C. § 1701 et seq., 5 U.S.C. § 5316, 43 U.S.C. § 1331 et seq., 43 U.S.C. § 1334(a)(1), 43 U.S.C. § 1334(a)(2), 5 U.S.C. § 5316, 5 U.S.C. § 5314, 5 U.S.C. § 5315, 5 U.S.C. § 5316, 5 U.S.C. § 5703, 31 U.S.C. § 3302
- Agencies affected: United States Congress, Executive Office of the President, United States Forest Service, United States Department of the Interior, Bureau of Land Management, Office of Surface Mining, United States Department of Defense,

[H.R. 2231 Legislative history]
- Introduced in the House as H.R. 2231 by Rep. Doc Hastings (R-WA) on June 4, 2013; Committee consideration by United States House Committee on Natural Resources, United States House Natural Resources Subcommittee on Energy and Mineral Resources; Passed the House on June 28, 2013 (Roll Call Vote 304: 235-186)

The Offshore Energy and Jobs Act (H.R. 2231) is a bill that was introduced into the United States House of Representatives during the 113th United States Congress. The Offshore Energy and Jobs Act would revise existing law governing the leasing, operation, and development of oil and natural gas resources available in the Outer Continental Shelf (OCS). The bill is primarily supported by Republicans and is opposed by President Barack Obama.

== Provisions/Elements of the bill ==
This summary is based largely on the summary provided by the Congressional Research Service, a public domain source.

The Offshore Energy and Jobs Act would amend the Outer Continental Shelf Lands Act (OCSLA) to direct the United States Secretary of the Interior to implement a leasing program that includes at least 50% of the available unleased acreage within each Outer Continental Shelf (OCS) planning area considered to have the largest undiscovered, technically recoverable oil and natural gas resources, with an emphasis on offering the most geologically prospective parts of the planning area.

The act instructs the Secretary, in developing a five-year oil and gas leasing program, to determine a specified domestic strategic production goal for the development of oil and natural gas as a result of that program.

It would also require the Secretary to: (1) develop and submit a new five-year oil and gas leasing program, (2) conduct offshore oil and gas Lease Sale 220 within one year after enactment of this Act, (3) make replacement lease blocks available in the Virginia lease sale planning area that are acceptable for oil and gas exploration and production if the Secretary of Defense proposes deferral from a lease offering due to defense-related activities irreconcilable with mineral exploration and development.

The bill instructs the Secretary to conduct a lease sale within two years after enactment of the Act for areas off the coast of South Carolina that have the most geologically promising hydrocarbon resources and constituting at least 25% of the leasable area within the South Carolina offshore administrative boundaries.

It also directs the Secretary to: (1) offer for sale by December 31, 2014, leases of tracts in the Santa Maria and Santa Barbara/Ventura Basins of the Southern California OCS Planning Area; and (2) prepare a multisale environmental impact statement pursuant to the National Environmental Policy Act of 1969 for all lease sales required under this Act.

The Offshore Energy and Jobs Act, if passed, would also:

- Allocate 37.5% of the amount of new federal leasing revenues to coastal states that are: (1) impacted by the leases under which those revenues are received by the United States, and (2) within 200 miles of the leased tract.
- Establish in the Department of the Interior: (1) an Under Secretary for Energy, Lands, and Minerals, (2) an Assistant Secretary of Ocean Energy and Safety, (3) an Assistant Secretary of Land and Minerals Management, (4) a Bureau of Ocean Energy, (5) an Ocean Energy Safety Service, and (6) an Office of Natural Resources Revenue.
- Instruct the Secretary to establish: (1) a National Offshore Energy Safety Academy, and (2) an Outer Continental Shelf Energy Safety Advisory Board.
- Require the Secretary to: (1) certify annually that all Interior Department personnel having regular, direct official contact with government contractors, or conducting investigations, issuing permits, or overseeing energy programs, comply fully with federal employee ethics laws and regulations; and (3) conduct a random drug testing program of such personnel.
- Abolish the Minerals Management Service.
- Direct the Secretary to collect non-refundable fees from the operators of facilities subject to inspection.
- Establish in the Treasury the Ocean Energy Enforcement Fund as depository for such fees.
- Redefine the outer Continental Shelf to include all submerged lands lying within the U.S. exclusive economic zone and the Continental Shelf adjacent to any U.S. territory.

== Congressional Budget office report ==
H.R. 2231 would revise existing laws and policies regarding the development of oil and gas resources on the Outer Continental Shelf (OCS). It would direct the Department of the Interior (DOI) to adopt a new leasing plan for the 2015–2020 period, require auctions of leases in certain areas in the Atlantic and Pacific OCS, and reduce the department's discretion regarding which regions would be included in future lease sales. Under this bill, some of the offsetting receipts from leases issued in newly available areas would be spent, without further appropriation, to make payments to states. Finally, H.R. 2231 would direct DOI to collect fees from certain firms that operate in the OCS and to implement various administrative reforms.

CBO estimates that enacting H.R. 2231 would reduce net direct spending by $1.5 billion over the 2014–2023 period. Pay-as-you-go procedures apply because enacting the legislation would reduce direct spending. In addition, CBO estimates that implementing the bill would cost $40 million over the 2013–2018 period, assuming appropriation of the necessary amounts. Enacting this bill would not affect revenues.

== Procedural history ==
=== House ===
The Offshore Energy and Jobs Act was introduced into the House on June 4, 2013 by Rep. Doc Hastings (R-WA). The bill was referred to the United States House Committee on Natural Resources and the United States House Natural Resources Subcommittee on Energy and Mineral Resources on June 4, 2013. The subcommittee held hearings on June 6 and 11, before discharging the bill back to the full committee on June 12, 2013. On June 12, the House Committee on Natural Resources marked-up the bill and ordered it reported in amended form by a vote of 23–18. On June 24, 2013, the bill was reported alongside House Report 113-125. On June 28, 2013, the House voted 235–186 in Roll Call Vote 304 to pass the Offshore Energy and Jobs Act. Sixteen Democrats voted in favor of the bill.

=== Presidential reaction ===
In a statement released on June 25, 2013, President of the United States Barack Obama issued a statement threatening to veto the Offshore Energy and Jobs Act if changes weren't made. In his statement, the President criticized the bill for setting "unworkable deadlines," for reducing the net return to taxpayers of money from the leasing of public land, and for the details of the reorganization of the former Minerals Management Service. Three days later, the House passed the bill over the President's objections.

== United States Senate ==
On July 8, 2013, the Bill was sent and received by "the Senate and Read twice and referred to the Committee on Energy and Natural Resources", after which it was never again considered.

== Debate and discussion ==
The House Republicans have three main talking points about their reasons for supporting the Offshore Energy and Jobs Act. Those three talking points are:

- "The President has implemented a virtual moratorium on oil and natural gas exploration and production in the OCS. His current 5-year leasing program blocks 85% of offshore areas from potential energy production."
- "By blocking OCS exploration and production, the President is also blocking the vast economic benefits it would provide."
- "In the long-run, offshore drilling has the potential to create 1.2 million jobs, $70 billion in wages, $2.2 trillion in tax receipts, and $8 trillion in additional economic output (GDP)."

Democrats responded to these arguments by insisting that there were enough open areas for energy companies to lease from and denied that the President's plan had increased gas prices.

== See also ==
- List of bills in the 113th United States Congress
- Offshore oil and gas in the United States
- Energy industry
- Offshore drilling on the US Atlantic coast
- United States offshore drilling debate
- Energy policy of the United States
- 2013 in the environment
- United States energy law
