= GVA Consultants =

GVA Consultants was a Swedish marine and offshore engineering company specialising in the design of offshore structures, and semi-submersible platforms.

== History ==
The experience of GVA as a marine engineering company stretches back more than 25 years. There is an even longer history of building ships of various types, semi-submersibles, jack-ups and offshore modules at the shipyard Götaverken Arendal AB where GVA is based.

From the late 1970s the yard focused mainly on the offshore industry. Thus, the company designed, constructed and delivered 14 semisubmersibles from its facilities in Gothenburg. Seven units of the GVA series have also been built by yards all over the world, in different sizes and for various requirements. The units built at the yard in Gothenburg were adapted for duties such as production, drilling, diving support and accommodation/service. The deliveries included six Pacesetter type units and eight GVA designs.

The shipyard closed down in 1989 and GVA Consultants AB was established from the shipyards technical departments. GVA started out as a small company focusing on engineering services and conceptual studies. The company grew considerably during the years when larger contracts such as Visund, Troll C, Åsgard B and Kristin Gas Field were awarded to them. The company has continued to grow and has taken on even larger projects such as the Thunder Horse and Atlantis oil fields.

In 2001, Halliburton KBRacquired GVA Consultants AB from British Maritime Technology (BMT)." Halliburton KBR was the engineering and construction segment of Halliburton, the world's largest provider of products and services to the petroleum and energy industries.

GVA Consultant's range of products and services includes:

- Conceptual designs
- Basic designs for the GVA Series of semi-submersibles
- Basic designs for other vessels
- Basic design for conversions or upgrades
- Consultation and project management support
- Research & development

GVA was a subsidiary to KBR but operated as a fully independent company providing specialized design services. The owner KBR shut down GVA Consultants in 2016.

== Vessels ==
Vessel	Oil field	Region	Depth (m)	Operator	Entered service	Builder
Kristin	Kristin	Norwegian Sea		Equinor		
Atlantis PQ	Atlantis	Gulf of Mexico	2,100	BP	2006	DSME
Thunder Horse PDQ	Thunder Horse	Gulf of Mexico	1,700	BP	2008	DSME
