= Thunder Horse Oil Field =

Offshore oil field

Thunder Horse oil field
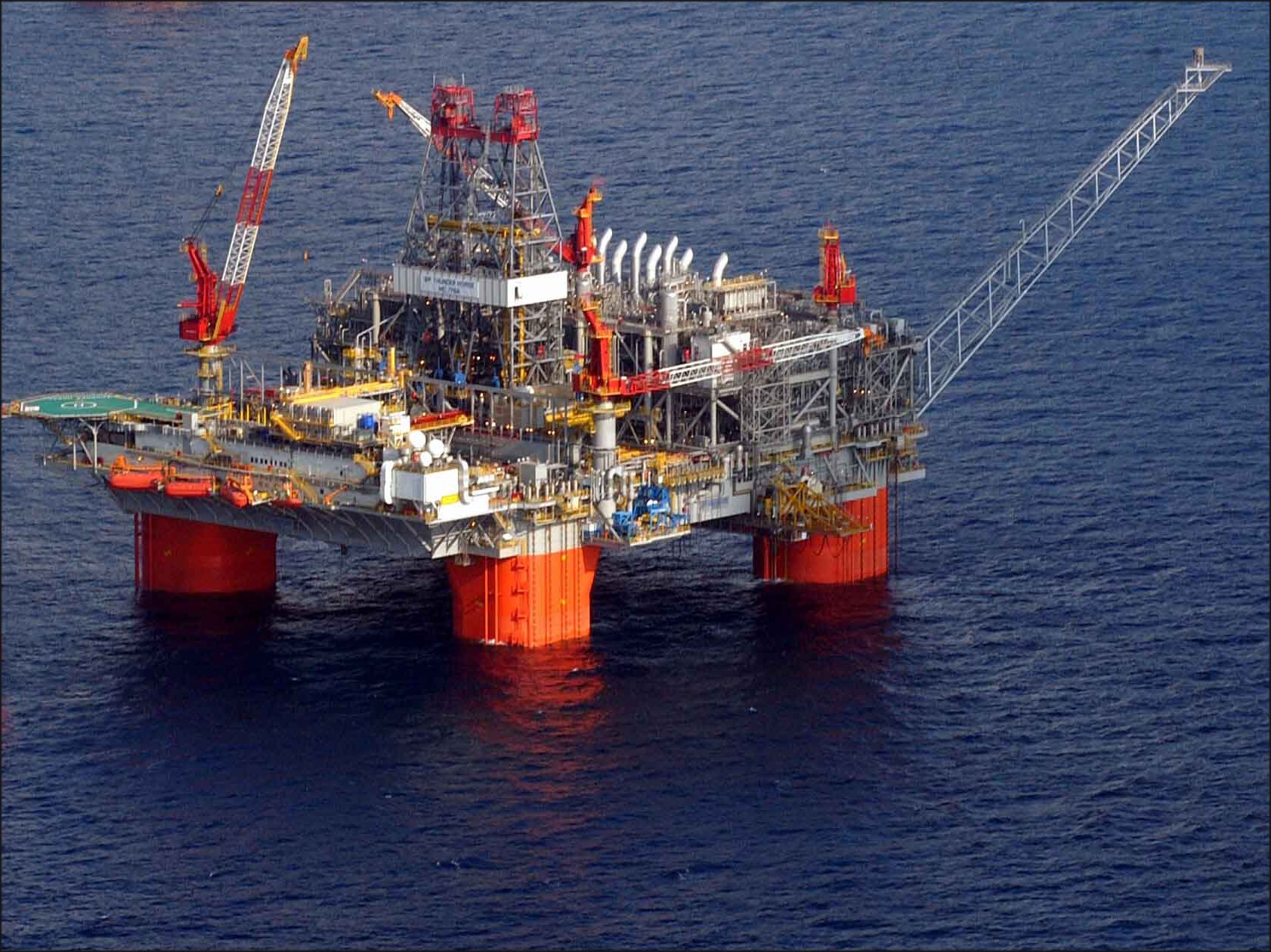
- Thunder Horse platform in the Gulf of Mexico in 2005.

- Location within the United States
- Country: United States
- Region: Gulf of Mexico
- Location: Mississippi Canyon
- Blocks: 776, 777, 778
- Offshore/onshore: Offshore
- Coordinates: 28.1091°N 88.4944°W
- Operator: BP plc
- Partners: BP plc (75%); ExxonMobil (25%)

Field history
- Discovery: 1999
- Start of development: 2000
- Start of production: 2008
- Peak year: 2009

Production
- Current production of oil: 200,000 barrels per day (~1.0×10^{7} t/a)
- Current production of gas: 200×10^{6} cu ft/d (5.7×10^{6} m^{3}/d)
- Estimated oil in place: 1,000 million barrels (~1.4×10^{8} t)
- Producing formations: Lower Tertiary

Thunder Horse oil field is a large offshore deepwater oil field in the Gulf of Mexico, around 150 miles (240 km) southeast of New Orleans, Louisiana. Large new oil discoveries within it were announced in early 2019.

== Description ==
The field is being developed by BP plc and 25% partner ExxonMobil It is the largest offshore production platform in the Gulf, with a processing capacity of 250 thousand barrels per day (40×10^{3} m^{3}/d) of oil and 200 million cubic feet per day (5,700,000 m^{3}/d) of natural gas, and the field is believed to hold in excess of 1 billion barrels (160×10^{6} m^{3}) of oil. Actual production approached capacity in March 2009, but started to decline soon after that.

In January 2019, BP announced a new billion barrels of oil have been found within the field.

== Discovery and development ==
The Thunder Horse discovery well was drilled in 1999 on Mississippi Canyon block 778. It was drilled to a depth of 25,770 feet (7,850 m) from the drillship Discoverer 534, hitting three intervals of oil.

A second well was drilled in block 822, 1.5 miles (2.4 km) southeast of the initial discovery, reaching a depth of 29,000 feet (8,800 m) in November 2000 and also encountered three primary intervals of oil.

In February 2001 a new field known as Thunder Horse North was drilled in block 776, approximately 5 miles northwest of the original field. This well reached 26,000 feet (7,900 m) and again met three intervals of oil.

Actually developing the field was a major technological challenge due to the depth of the find. Not only are the distances large, but at such depths the formations holding the hydrocarbons create pressures over 1,200 bars (120 MPa) and temperatures of 135 °C (275 °F). Prior to Thunder Horse, no field had ever been developed at such a depth.

Following lengthy delays caused by the need to repair and replace components in the subsea system (following a failure during pre-commissioning checks), "First oil" came on June 14, 2008. Since then, Thunder Horse has steadily ramped up its production by bringing on new wells. In March 2009, Thunder Horse produced close to 250,000 barrels per day (40,000 m^{3}/d) oil equivalent in oil and natural gas from seven wells. Plans were in place to add two additional wells in 2009 to further develop the north end of the field. By January 2010 the MMS data indicated that total daily production during 2009 had declined from near 250,000 to 175,000 barrels per day (39,700 to 27,800 m^{3}/d). The Washington Post noted in May 2010 that "There could be less off-shore oil than the [Obama] administration assumes" quoting an analysis in The Oil Drum by Glenn Morton, a consultant for oil exploration projects who stated that "Thunder Horse hasn't reached anywhere near its expected potential," in oil or natural gas a fact which "underscore[s] the point that deepwater oil drilling is a tricky process, and not always as easy or predictable as thought" By January 2022, Thunder Horse was again producing 200,000 barrels of oil equivalent per day.

== Thunder Horse platform ==
Thunder Horse PDQ is the largest moored semi-submersible production oil platform in the world, located in 1,920 metres (6,300 ft) of water in the Mississippi Canyon Block 778/822, about 150 miles (240 km) southeast of New Orleans.

The hull section was constructed by DSME in South Korea and delivered in to Kiewit Offshore Services in Ingleside, Texas on 23 September 2004 aboard MV Blue Marlin for completion. Thunder Horse was completed at Kiewit Offshore Services in nearby Ingleside, Texas.

Thunder Horse PDQ was evacuated with the approach of Hurricane Dennis in July 2005. After the hurricane passed, the platform was listing badly. The platform was designed for a 100-year event, and inspection teams found no hull damage, and no water was taken on from a leak through its hull. Rather, an incorrectly plumbed, 6-inch length of pipe allowed water to flow freely among several ballast tanks that set forth a chain of events causing the platform to tip into the water. The platform was fully righted about a week after Dennis, delaying commercial production initially scheduled for late 2005. During repairs, it was discovered that the underwater manifold was severely cracked due to poorly welded pipes. The rig's design engineer, Gordon Aaker, said that the cracked manifold could have caused a catastrophic oil spill.

The platform took a near-direct hit six weeks later by Hurricane Katrina, but was undamaged.

As of 2025, the Thunder Horse oil field, operated primarily by BP with ExxonMobil as a partner, is producing oil at an estimated capacity of around 200,000 barrels of oil equivalent per day. The field has a peak capacity estimated at 250,000 barrels of oil per day and 200 million cubic feet of gas per day. However, current production is somewhat below peak capacity, owing to the natural decline of mature fields, despite expansion projects such as Thunder Horse South Expansion Phase II being brought online as recently as 2021.

== Naming dispute ==
Originally called Crazy Horse, BP changed the name out of respect to descendants of the Native American warrior of the same name. The company said that it acted after the family of the Lakota warrior and spiritual leader told them that use of his name outside of a spiritual context is sacrilegious.

== See also ==
- Offshore oil and gas in the US Gulf of Mexico
- Oil fields operated by BP
- Tiber oil field
