= Drill, baby, drill =

US Republican Party political slogan

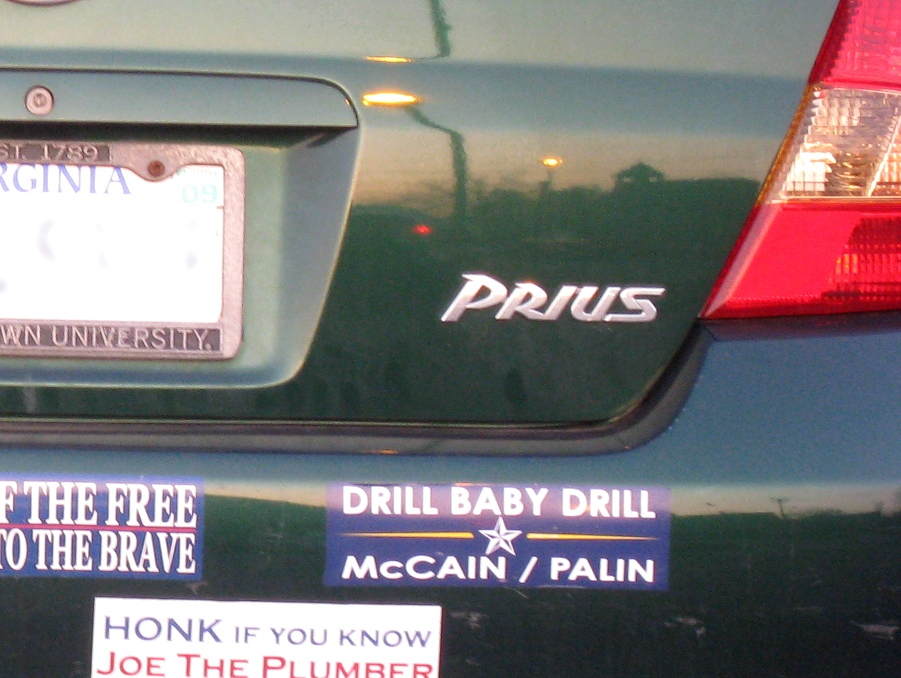
Campaign sticker (2009)

"Drill, baby, drill!" is a slogan expressing support for increased drilling for petroleum and gas as sources of additional energy.

It was first used in a Republican campaign at the 2008 Republican National Convention by former Maryland lieutenant governor Michael Steele, who was later elected chairman of the Republican National Committee. The slogan gained further prominence after it was used by Republican vice presidential nominee Sarah Palin during the vice-presidential debate. President Donald Trump used the phrase repeatedly during his 2024 presidential campaign, including when speaking at the 2024 Republican National Convention, as well as at his 2025 inaugural address.

== Vice presidential debate ==
On October 2, 2008, at the vice-presidential debate between Sarah Palin and Joe Biden, "drill, baby, drill" reached a new prominence. Referring to the energy crisis and McCain's 20 votes against funding solar and wind energy, Joe Biden stated that McCain thinks "the only answer is drill, drill, drill. Drill we must, but it will take 10 years for one drop of oil to come out of any of the wells that will be drilled." Palin responded, "The chant is 'drill, baby, drill.' And that's what we hear all across this country in our rallies because people are so hungry for those domestic sources of energy to be tapped into."

== Aftermath of the BP oil spill ==
Republicans continued to use the slogan after the 2008 election. In 2010, however, the slogan received renewed attention because of the Deepwater Horizon oil spill, a major oil spill at a BP offshore drilling rig in the Gulf of Mexico. The spill caused extensive environmental damages and economic losses estimated in the billions of dollars. As a result, some proponents of "Drill, baby, drill" became embarrassed about their previous support. The slogan was parodied as "Spill, baby, spill", and "Kill, baby, Kill". Two senior Republican senators, Jon Kyl and Pat Roberts, made comments attempting to distance themselves and the Republican Party from the slogan.

== Legacy ==
Fred Krupp of the Environmental Defense Fund in 2014 harked back to the "drill baby" phrase as he launched a renewed effort to limit the environmental impact of hydraulic fracturing (fracking).

== Other uses of this slogan ==
The Norwegian Progress Party's Youth Wing used the slogan "Drill, baby, drill!" in 2021 to symbolize that the party does not want Norway to stop drilling for oil and gas. An analysis by researchers at Smith School of Enterprise and the Environment concluded that implementing "Drill, baby, drill" policy in the North Sea oil would not reduce energy costs for British households.

== See also ==
- Bakken formation
- Oil discovery
- United States offshore drilling debate
