= Mad Dog oil field =

Offshore oil field in the Gulf of Mexico

Mad Dog Oil Field
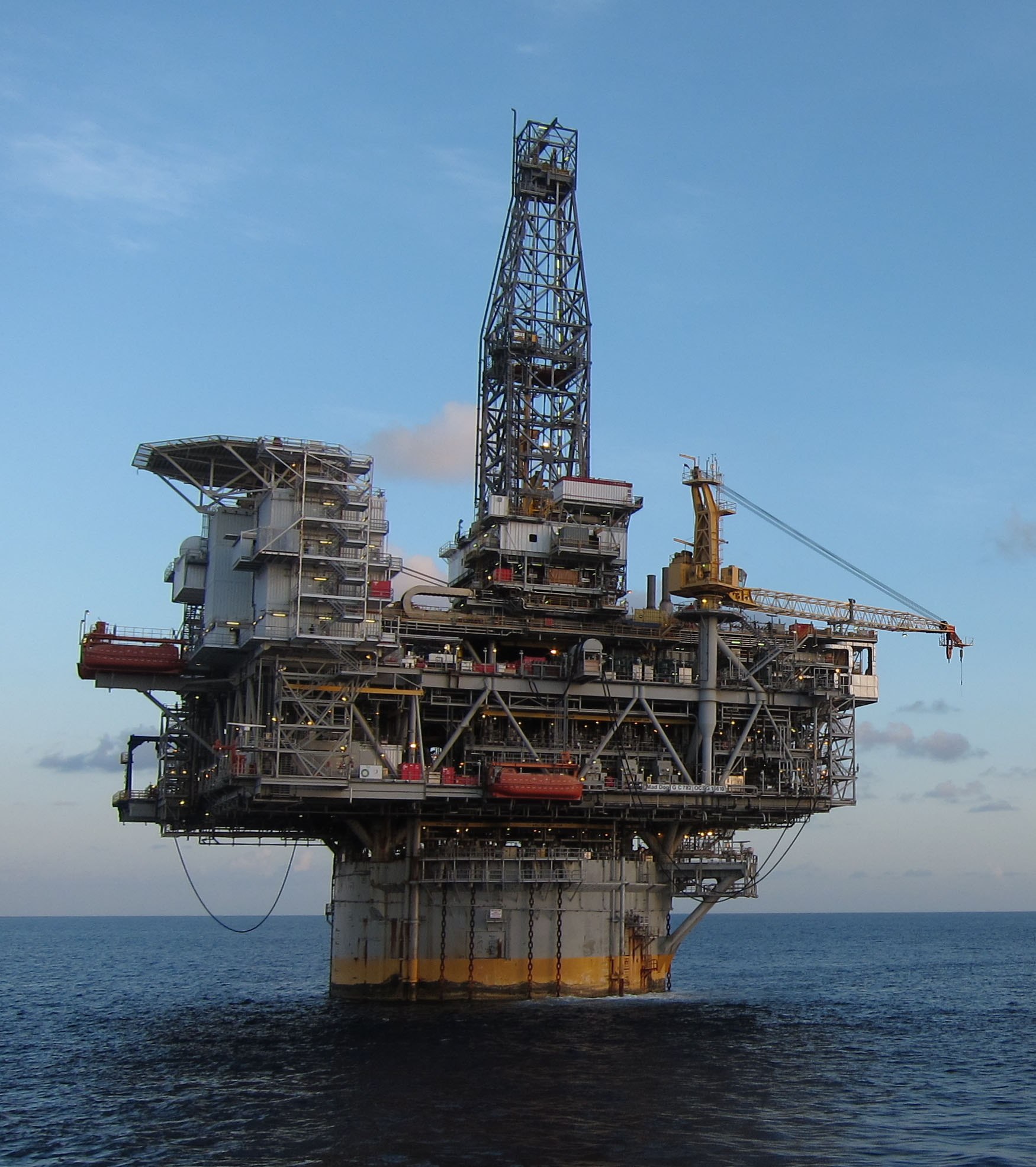
- The Mad Dog spar platform

- Location within the United States
- Country: United States
- Region: Gulf of Mexico
- Location: Green Canyon
- Block: 825, 826 and 782
- Offshore/onshore: Offshore
- Coordinates: 27°11′18″N 91°5′12″W
- Operator: BP
- Partners: BP; Woodside Energy; Chevron Corporation

Field history
- Discovery: May 1998
- Start of production: 2005

Production
- Estimated oil in place: 450 million barrels (~6.1×10^{7} t)

Mad Dog Oil Field is an offshore oil field located along the Sigsbee Escarpment at Green Canyon blocks 825, 826 and 782, Western Atwater Foldbelt, Gulf of Mexico. The field is located about 190 miles (310 km) south of New Orleans and 150 miles (240 km) southwest of Venice, Louisiana, United States. It is in the depth of 5,000 to 7,000 feet (1,500 to 2,100 m) of water.

The field was discovered in May 1998 and it became operational in 2005. It is owned by BP (60.5%), Woodside Energy (23.9%), and Chevron Corporation (15.6%). The operator is BP.

The gross estimated reserves are ranged from 200 to 450 million barrels (32×10^{6} to 72×10^{6} m^{3}) of oil equivalent. The field has production capacity around 100,000 barrels per day (16,000 m^{3}/d) of oil and 60 million cubic feet per day (1.7×10^{6} m^{3}/d) of natural gas. Oil is transported to Ship Shoal 332B via the Caesar pipeline, while natural gas is transported via the Cleopatra pipeline.

The field is operated by using a truss spar oil platform manufactured in Finland. The hull measures are 128 feet (39 m) in diameter and 555 feet (169 m) in length. Its weight is 20,800 tonnes. The deck measures are 220 by 163 feet (67 by 50 m). It includes production facilities with 13 production slots, a drilling riser slot and two service slots, and quarters for 126 personnel. The front-end engineering design of the second spar will be done by Technip.

It was reported on September 16, 2008 that Mad Dog was damaged due to Hurricane Ike. The drilling derrick was toppled over and was on the sea bed. A new drilling package was built and replaced the damaged one on the spar in early 2012.

== See also ==
- Offshore oil and gas in the US Gulf of Mexico
