= Mississippi Canyon =

Undersea canyon in the Gulf of Mexico

Coordinates: 28°30′N 89°45′W

Mississippi Canyon (the United States)

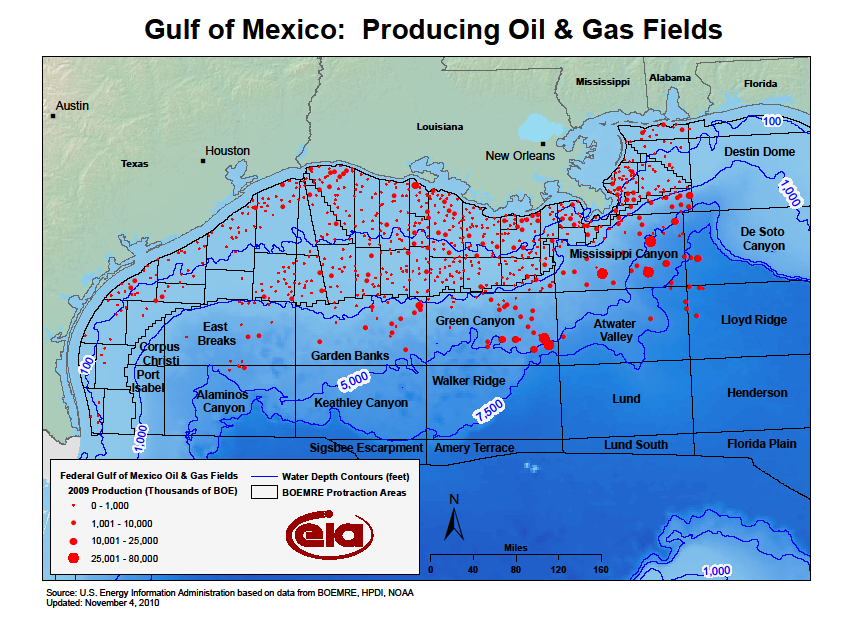
Off shore oil and gas fields in Gulf of Mexico. The Mississippi Canyon leasing area is delineated in the upper right, south of the Mississippi River outlet.

The Mississippi Canyon is an undersea canyon, part of the Mississippi Submarine Valley in the North-central Gulf of Mexico, south of Louisiana. According to the U.S. Geological Survey GLORIA Mapping Program, it is the dominant feature of the north-central Gulf of Mexico. According to GCAGS Transactions, it has an average width of 8 kilometres (5.0 mi), and a length of 120 kilometres (75 mi). The US Minerals Management Service (MMS) applies the name Mississippi Canyon to numbered federal oil and gas lease blocks over a large offshore area centered on, but mostly outside, the submarine canyon.

== Oil and gas exploration and production ==
According to "Deepwater Gulf of Mexico 2004: America's Expanding Frontier", a report issued by the Minerals Management Service (MMS) Gulf of Mexico OCS Region, of the ten deepwater discoveries in water depths greater than 7,000 ft (2,134 m), three were in the Mississippi Canyon area: Aconcagua project, area/block MC305, 7,379 ft (2,249 m) deep; and Camden Hills project, MC348, 7,530 ft (2,300 m) deep, both discovered in 1999; and Blind Faith project, MC696, 7,116 ft (2,169 m) deep, discovered in 2001. In a separate section of the same report, note is made of acreage in the Thunder Horse project, MC778, acquired in 1988. Other projects noted for Mississippi Canyon include Thunder Horse areas/blocks MC775-778 and MC819-822, listed as completed grid PEA (programmatic environmental assessment) by BP.

An MMS list of 80 development systems of productive deepwater Gulf of Mexico projects from 1979 to 2003 includes 29 projects in the Mississippi Canyon area:

Year of 1st Production	Project Name	Operator	Block	Water Depth ft.	System Type
1979	Cognac	Shell	MC194	1,023	Fixed Platform
1984	Lena	ExxonMobil	MC280	1,000	Compliant Tower
1991	Amberjack	BP	MC109	1,100	Fixed Platform
1992	Alabaster	ExxonMobil	MC485	1,438	Subsea
1993	Diamond	Kerr McGee	MC445	2,095	Subsea
1993	Zink	ExxonMobil	MC354	1,478	Subsea
1996	Mars	Shell	MC807	2,933	TLP/Subsea
1997	Mensa	Shell	MC731	5,318	Subsea
1999	Gemini	ChevronTexaco	MC292	3,393	Subsea
1999	Pluto	Mariner	MC674	2,828	Subsea
1999	Ursa	Shell	MC809	1,478	TLP
2000	Europa	Shell	MC935	3,870	Subsea
2000	King	Shell	MC764	3,250	Subsea
2001	Crosby	Shell	MC899	4,440	Subsea
2001	MC68	Walter	MC68	1,360	Subsea
2001	Mica	ExxonMobil	MC211	4,580	Subsea
2002	Aconcagua	TotalFinaElf	MC305	7,100	Subsea
2002	Camden Hills	Marathon	MC348	7,216	Subsea
2002	Horn Mountain	BP	MC127	5,400	Spar
2002	King	BP	MC84	5,000	Subsea
2002	Princess	Shell	MC765	3,600	Subsea
2003	East Anstey/Na Kika	Shell	MC607	6,590	FPS/Subsea
2003	Fourier/Na Kika	Shell	MC522	6,950	FPS/Subsea
2003	Goose	Statoil	MC751	1,624	Subsea
2003	Herschel/Na Kika	Shell	MC520	6,739	FPS/Subsea
2003	Matterhorn	TotalFinaElf	MC243	2,850	TLP
2003	Medusa	Murphy	MC582	2,223	Spar
2003	Pardner	Anadarko	MC401	1,139	Subsea
2003	Zia	Devon	MC496	1,804	Subsea

Five of the top 20 deepwater Gulf of Mexico production blocks for 2000-01 were in the Mississippi Canyon, including the top 2: Project Mars, 2,933 feet (894 m) deep, 137 million barrels (21.8×10^{6} m^{3}) of oil equivalent (BOE); project Ursa, 3,800 feet (1,200 m) deep, 93 million barrels (14.8×10^{6} m^{3}) of BOE; project Mensa, 5,280 feet (1,610 m), 27 million barrels (4.3×10^{6} m^{3}) of BOE; Cognac, 1,023 feet (312 m), 23 million barrels (3.7×10^{6} m^{3}) of BOE; Crosby, 4,259 feet (1,298 m), 18 million barrels (2.9×10^{6} m^{3}) of BOE, all managed by Shell.

== Deepwater Horizon explosion ==
On April 20, 2010, the Deepwater Horizon drilling rig, located in the MMS Mississippi Canyon block 252, which is about 40 miles (64 km) off the Louisiana coast, suffered a catastrophic explosion; it sank a day-and-a-half later. Although initial reports indicated that relatively little oil had leaked, by April 27 it was stated by BP that approximately 5,000 barrels (790 m^{3}) of oil per day were issuing from the wellhead, 1 mile (1.6 km) below the surface on the ocean floor. The resulting oil slick quickly expanded to cover hundreds of square miles of ocean surface, posing a threat to marine life and adjacent coastal wetlands. On June 10, the Flow Rate Group from the Deepwater Horizon Incident Joint Information Center reported that they have determined that the estimated flow rate from the out of control well head has been 20,000 barrels (3,200 m^{3}) to 40,000 barrels (6,400 m^{3}) per day.

== See also ==
- Offshore oil and gas in the US Gulf of Mexico
