= 2013 in the environment =

This is a list of notable events relating to the environment in 2013. They relate to environmental law, conservation, environmentalism and environmental issues.

== Events ==
- The London Array, an off-shore wind farm in the Thames Estuary in the United Kingdom, becomes the largest of its type in the world.
- The Ok Tedi mine, responsible for the Ok Tedi environmental disaster, is set to close.

=== January ===
- A controversial campaign to eradicate cats in New Zealand is launched, attracting international attention.
- There was international condemnation when over 1000 bottlenose dolphins were killed in the Solomon Islands.

=== March ===
- The Mayflower oil spill occurred when an ExxonMobil pipeline carrying Canadian Wabasca heavy crude from the Athabasca oil sands ruptured in Mayflower, Arkansas in the United States. Approximately 12,000 barrels (1,900 m3) of oil mixed with water had been recovered by 31 March. The United States Environmental Protection Agency classified the leak as a major spill.

=== April ===
- The 2013 Goldman Environmental Prize was awarded to Azzam Alwash from Iraq, Aleta Baun from Indonesia, Jonathan Deal from South Africa, Rossano Ercolini from Italy, Nohra Padilla from Colombia, and Kimberly Wasserman from the United States.

=== May ===
- Jairo Mora Sandoval was murdered while attempting to protect leatherback turtle nests in Costa Rica.
- Protests in Turkey over development of Taksim Gezi Park in Istanbul resulted in eight deaths and over 2000 injuries.

=== July ===
- July 8 - in the United States Congress, a Republican Party backed bill to increase offshore oil drilling was received by "the Senate and Read twice and referred to the Committee on Energy and Natural Resources", after which it was never again considered.

=== November ===
- The 19th yearly session of the United Nations Climate Change Conference will be held in Warsaw, Poland from 11 to 22 November.

== See also ==
- List of protected areas established in 2013
- Human impact on the environment
- List of environmental issues
- List of years in the environment
