= List of protected areas established in 2013 =

This is a list of notable protected areas established in 2013.

Name	Country	Area (ha)
Akaroa Marine Reserve	New Zealand	475
Charles Young Buffalo Soldiers National Monument	United States	
First State National Monument	United States	
Great Blue Heron Provincial Park	Canada	11,168
Harriet Tubman Underground Railroad National Monument	United States	
Mont-Gosford Ecological Reserve	Canada	307
Opémican National Park	Canada	25,250
Rio Grande del Norte National Monument	United States	98,118
San Juan Islands National Monument	United States	400
Tursujuq National Park	Canada	2,612,100
Waitawa Regional Park	New Zealand	188

== See also ==
- 2013 in the environment
