= Knotty Head =

Oil field in the Gulf of Mexico

Coordinates: 27°23.1′N 90°24.63′W

Knotty Head was at one point the deepest oil well in the Gulf of Mexico. It is drilled in 3,500 ft (1,067 m) of water and 30,589 ft (9,324 m) below the sea floor. It is jointly owned by Chevron Corporation, Occidental Petroleum, BHP and Nexen Inc. with each having 25% of the share. Initially, the well was estimated to hold 350 million to one billion barrels of oil, but additional tests have cut that estimate down to 200 million to 500 million. The field is located in the Green Canyon Area, section 512.

== See also ==
- Offshore oil and gas in the US Gulf of Mexico
