= Jack 2 =

Oil field in the Gulf of Mexico

Jack 2 is a test well in the deep waters of the Gulf of Mexico (Walker Ridge Block 758) that successfully extracted oil from the Paleogene area of the Gulf in the second quarter of 2006. The field owners Chevron, Devon Energy and Norway's Statoil drilled to about 20,000 feet (6,100 m) below the sea floor, the wellhead being 7,000 feet (2,100 m) below sea-level, for a total depth of 28,125 feet. Oil flowed at more than 6,000 barrels (950 m^{3}) per day. At the time, it was the deepest ever successful test well in the Gulf of Mexico to date. Jack 2 is a joint venture between Chevron Corporation (50%), Devon Energy (25%), and StatoilHydro (25%).

Most oil in the Gulf of Mexico is found on a continental shelf in less than 1,700 feet (520 m) of water. Oil was known to exist in the deeper waters of the Gulf between 5,000 and 10,000 feet (1,500 and 3,000 m), but it had yet to be proven that enough could be extracted to make the venture economically successful. The Jack 2 well is 175 miles (282 km) offshore in more than 7,000 feet (2,100 m) of water. The oil was extracted after drilling through more than 20,000 feet (6,100 m) of rock beneath the ocean floor.

Jack 2 proved the existence of a new play in the deepwater Gulf of Mexico. The estimated oil reserves the play could contain range between 3 billion barrels (480,000,000 m^{3}) and 15 billion barrels (2.4×10^{9} m^{3}). News of the find was credited for contributing to a drop in crude oil prices. The maximum estimate of 15 billion barrels (2.4×10^{9} m^{3}) represents half of the total current estimate of U.S. reserves, equal to slightly less than two years of U.S. consumption at 2001 levels.

== See also ==
- Offshore oil and gas in the US Gulf of Mexico
