= Offshore oil and gas in the Gulf of Mexico (United States) =

Major petroleum-producing area

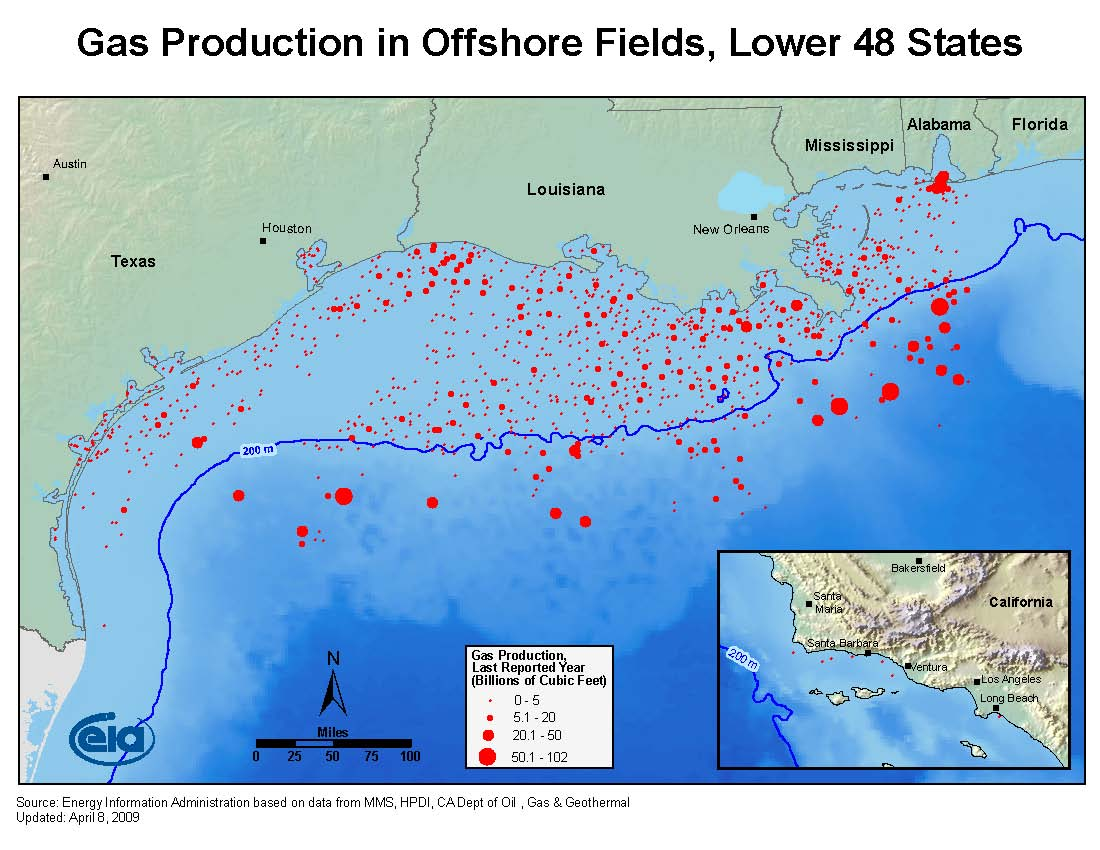
Gas production in Offshore Fields, Lower 48 States, in about 2009

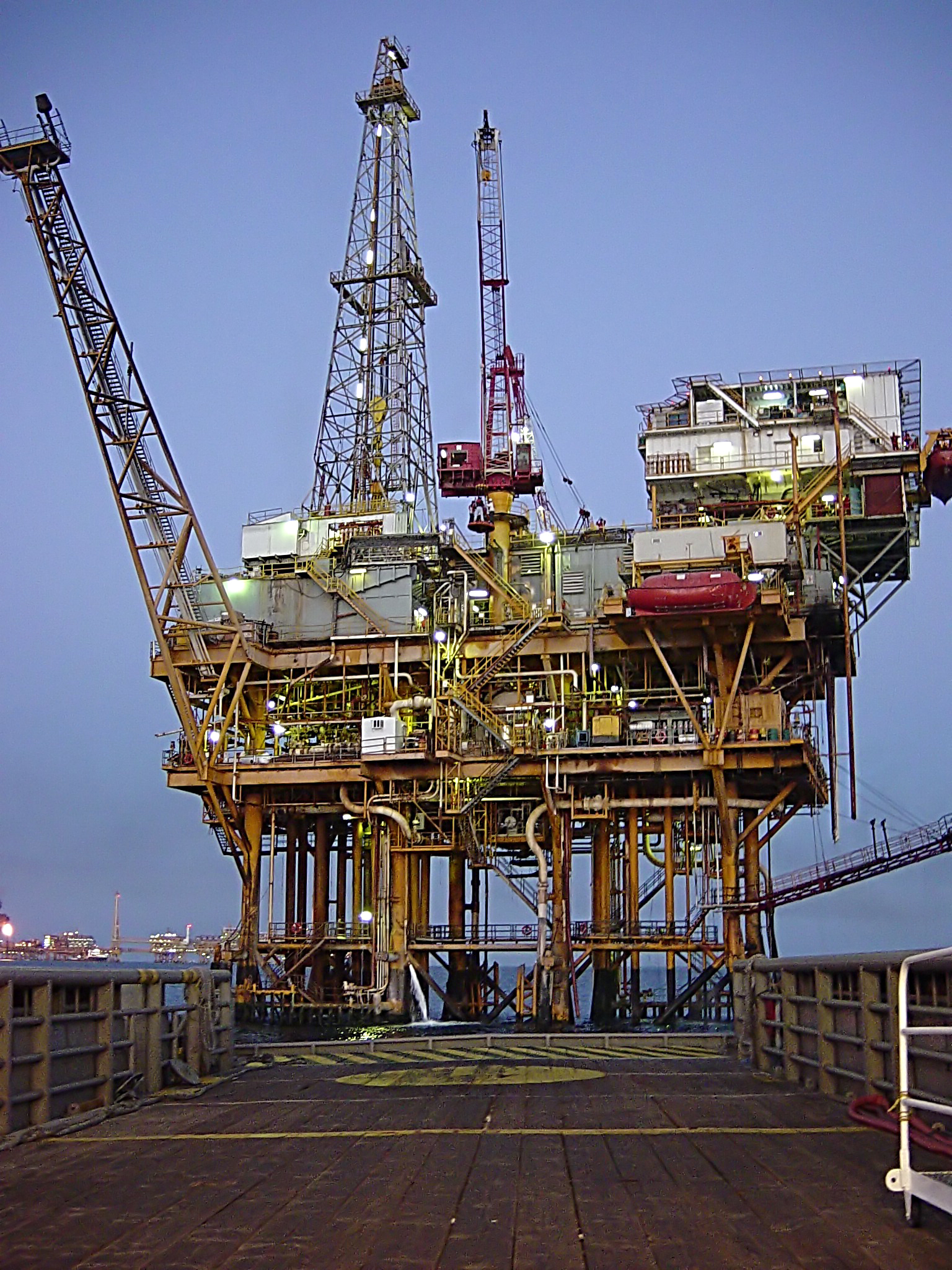
Offshore platform located in the Gulf

Offshore oil and gas in the Gulf of Mexico is a major source of oil and natural gas in the United States. The western and central Gulf of Mexico, which includes offshore Texas, Louisiana, Mississippi, and Alabama, is one of the major petroleum-producing areas of the United States. Crude oil production from US federal waters in the Gulf reached an all-time annual high of about 1.9 million barrels per day in 2019, and was about 1.8 million in 2024. There were ten new oil fields which had been planned to start production in about 2018 and 2019. According to the Energy Information Administration, "Gulf of Mexico federal offshore oil production accounts for 15% of total U.S. crude oil production and federal offshore natural gas production in the Gulf accounts for 5% of total U.S. dry production."

Major fields include Eugene Island block 330 oil field, Atlantis Oil Field, and the Tiber Oil Field (discovered 2009). Notable oil platforms include Baldpate, Bullwinkle, Mad Dog, Magnolia, Mars, Petronius, and Thunder Horse. Notable individual wells include Jack 2 and Knotty Head.

== History of Gulf oil production ==
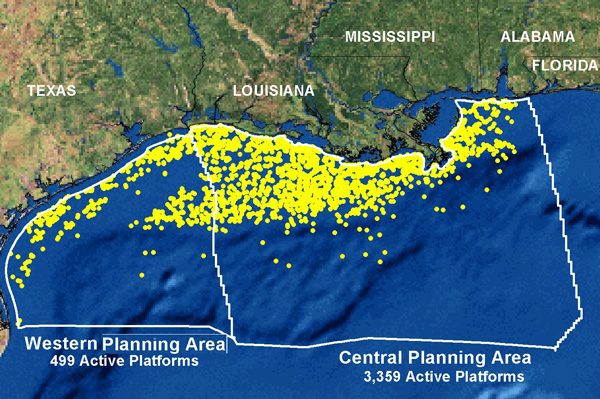
Map of active oil rigs in the Gulf in 2006

As technology has progressed over the years, oil companies have extended drilling and production farther and farther from shore, and into deeper and deeper waters. In 1937, Superior Oil of California and Pure Oil constructed a platform just over a mile from the shore at a depth of 13 feet. A year later, Humble Oil built a mile-long wooden trestle with railway tracks into the sea at McFadden Beach on the Gulf of Mexico, placing a derrick at its end - this was later destroyed by a hurricane. A platform was installed in a hundred feet of water for the first time in 1955; in two hundred feet of water in 1962; and in a thousand feet of water in 1979. "By 1970, the technology existed to drill in 2,000 feet of water and actual exploratory drilling was taking place at 1,400 feet." By 2009, more than 70% of Gulf of Mexico oil production came from wells drilled in depths greater than 1,000 feet (300 m), almost double from the percentage ten years ago.

The deepest water depth in which a discovery has been made is 9,975 feet (3,040 m), at Lloyd Ridge 370 (Diamond).

The federal government has not allowed drilling in federal waters in the eastern Gulf of Mexico, which includes offshore Florida and part of offshore Alabama, since 1995. In March 2010, President Barack Obama announced plans to allow drilling in the eastern Gulf of Mexico, in federal waters greater than 125 miles (201 km) from the coasts of Alabama and Florida. In December 2010, following the Deepwater Horizon oil spill, the Obama administration reversed its plans to open the eastern Gulf, and imposed a moratorium on new drilling in the eastern Gulf of Mexico for at least seven years.

In April 2016, the US Bureau of Safety and Environmental Enforcement (BSEE) issued final well control regulations to improve the effectiveness of offshore safety.

In November 2021, the Department of the Interior's Bureau of Ocean Energy Management made available for auction, for the purpose of oil and gas production, about 80.9 million acres in federal lands located offshore in the Gulf of Mexico. These 80 million acres of available tracts represented the largest ever lease of oil and gas drilling leases in the United States. Of the 80 million acres up for auction, 1.7 million acres of drilling rights sold. The sales generated about $191 million in revenue for the government. Chevron was the largest buyer, spending $47.1 million, followed by Anadarko, BP, Royal Dutch Shell, and Exxon. Exxon's spending of $14.9 million represented the largest sale by acreage, including 94 shallow water tracts. For context, in January 2021, the new administration in the United States paused most new oil and gas leases on federal land. In response, a federal court in Louisiana issued an order in June 2021 that prompted the Biden administration to conduct the auction, but it was later determined that the order did not require the auction to be held. The timing was such that the auction was held about a week after the conclusion of a group of worldwide environmental talks known as COP 26.

=== Deepwater Horizon Oil Spill ===
The Deepwater Horizon oil spill began on April 20, 2010 when an explosion struck the rig. It occurred in the Gulf of Mexico on the BP-operated Macondo Prospect and killed eleven people. It is considered the largest marine oil spill in the history of the petroleum industry and sources estimated that between 134–206 million gallons of oil was released into the gulf. This oil spill was larger than the second largest oil spill at Ixtoc I which released 140 million gallons of crude oil into the Bay of Campeche.

== Production ==
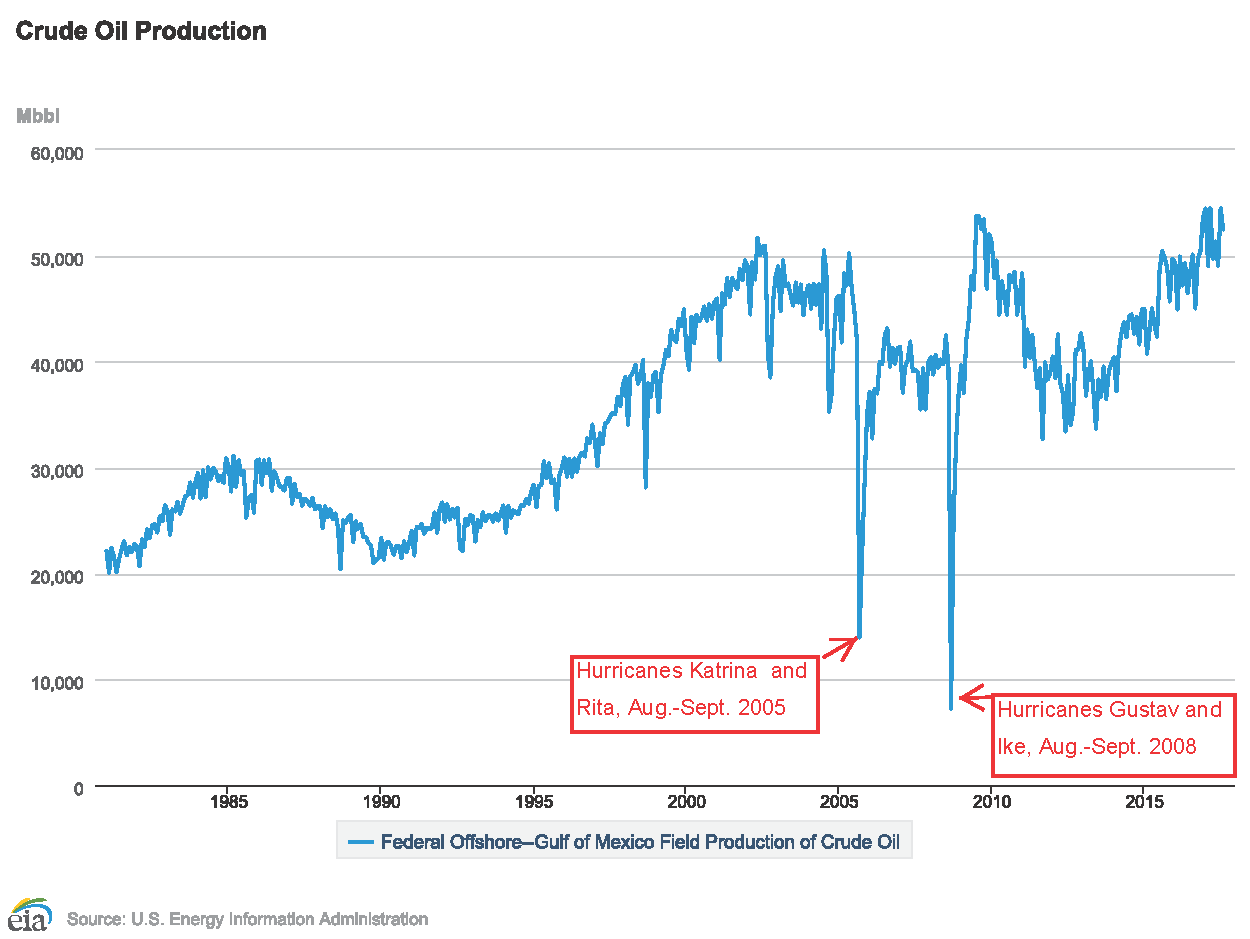
Oil production in the US Federal zone, offshore Gulf of Mexico

In 2012, federal leases in the Gulf of Mexico produced 463 million barrels (73.6×10^{6} m^{3}) of oil, which made up 19.5% of all U.S. oil production that year, and more than that of any U.S. state other than Texas. The 2012 production was less than the 570 million barrels (91×10^{6} m^{3}) in 2009; however, due to new deep-water discoveries, the U.S. Bureau of Ocean Energy Management, Regulation and Enforcement projected that oil production from the Gulf of Mexico would increase to 686 million barrels (109.1×10^{6} m^{3}) per year by 2013. The production level reached 1,898 million barrels (301.8×10^{6} m^{3})1,898 million barrels in 2025.

== Louisiana ==
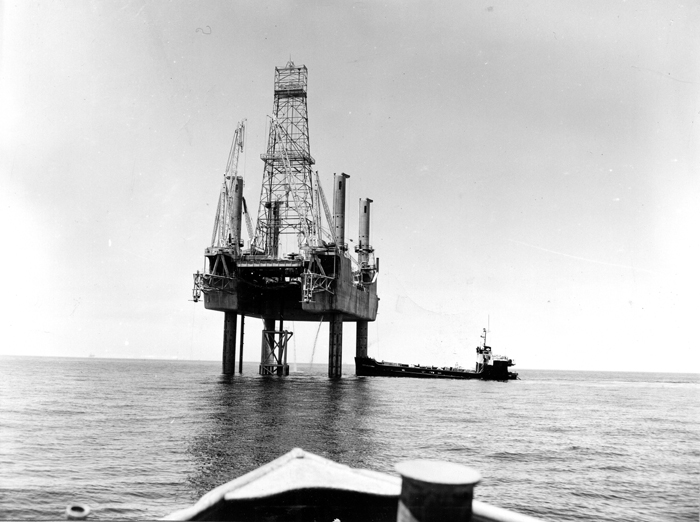
A mobile drilling platform in federal water offshore Louisiana, 1957

The state of Louisiana issued its first offshore oil and gas lease in 1936, and the following year the Pure Oil Company discovered the first Louisiana offshore oil field, the Creole Field, 1.2 miles (1.9 km) from the shore of Cameron Parish, from a platform built on timber pilings in 10-to-15-foot-deep (3.0 to 4.6 m) water. Today, there are more than 4,000 production platforms and drilling rigs off the coast of Louisiana.

== Texas ==
The first offshore well in Texas was drilled in 1938, but the first oil discovery was not made until 1941, off Jefferson County. Through 2007, Texas state waters have produced 39 million barrels (6.2×10^{6} m^{3}) of oil and 4.0 trillion cubic feet (110 km^{3}) of natural gas. In 2007, Texas state waters produced 600,000 barrels (95,000 m^{3}) of oil and condensate and 26 billion cubic feet (0.74 km^{3}) gas.

== Alabama ==
The first oil test in offshore Alabama was made in Mobile Bay in 1951. The first discovery in state waters of offshore Alabama was made in 1979. By 2005 a total of 80 wells have been drilled in state water, and production in Alabama state water provided 154 billion cubic feet (4.4 km^{3}) per year, half the state's gas production.

== Florida ==
The eastern Gulf of Mexico, which includes offshore Gulf Coast Florida, has never been a petroleum-producing area. From the 1950s to the 1990s, oil companies drilled exploratory wells off the Gulf Coast of Florida. Nineteen wells were drilled in state waters, and forty were drilled in federal waters.

Gulf Oil drilled the first offshore Florida oil exploration wells in 1947, in state waters in Florida Bay south of Cape Sable, Monroe County. In 1956 Humble Oil drilled an exploratory well in state waters of Pensacola Bay, Santa Rosa County. In 1959 Gulf Oil drilled the first offshore Florida well drilled from an offshore platform, off the Florida Keys. All the wells drilled in state waters were dry holes.

The first federal lease sale offshore Florida was in 1959. In the 1980s the state of Florida objected to further federal lease sales in offshore Florida, and the last one was held in 1985. Because of state objections, the federal government agreed to pay $200 million to nine oil companies to buy back leases south of 26 degrees north latitude.

In the 1970s and early 1980s, oil companies drilled 16 wells on and around the Destin Dome, in federal waters off the Florida Panhandle; none were successful. Then from 1987 to 1995 Chevron made commercial gas discoveries on the Destin Dome 25 miles (40 km) off the coast. The discovery extended the Norphlet productive trend, which is highly productive in Alabama state waters in Mobile Bay. However, the state of Florida objected to plans to produce the deposits, and in May 2002, the US government agreed to buy back 7 leases from Chevron, Conoco, and Murphy Oil for $115 million.

In 1947, the state of Florida issued a long-term oil and gas lease for state waters in the Gulf, stretching from Apalachicola Bay in the north to Naples in the south. The lease, which now belongs to Coastal Petroleum, was renegotiated in 1975 to leave Coastal with partial rights from 0–7.4 miles (0.0–11.9 km) from the shore, and full rights to state waters from 7.4–10.4 miles (11.9–16.7 km) from the shore. Florida has since banned offshore drilling in state waters, and has a long-running legal dispute with Coastal over Coastal's efforts to drill the offshore lease.

Florida banned drilling in state waters in 1992, and has also opposed additional drilling in federal waters off Florida. However, in April 2009 three committees of the Florida House of Representatives approved a bill that would allow offshore drilling in state waters more than 3 miles (4.8 km) from shore. Because state waters extend only 3 miles (4.8 km) from shore on the east coast of Florida, the legislation would have affected only state waters on the Gulf coast of the state, where state waters extend out to 10.5 statute miles (16.9 km) from shore. The bill passed the Florida House in April 2009, but died soon after in the Florida Senate.

== Natural gas hydrates ==
Natural gas hydrates have long been known to exist in sediments beneath the Gulf of Mexico. In May 2009 the US Geological Survey announced the discovery of thick natural gas hydrate deposits beneath the Gulf of Mexico that are recoverable by current technology. To date, natural gas from hydrates has not been produced from the Gulf of Mexico.

== See also ==
- Offshore oil and gas in the United States
- Offshore drilling
- Oil platform
- Rigs-to-Reefs
- United States offshore drilling debate
- North Sea oil
