= Thunder Horse PDQ =

Offshore oil drilling platform

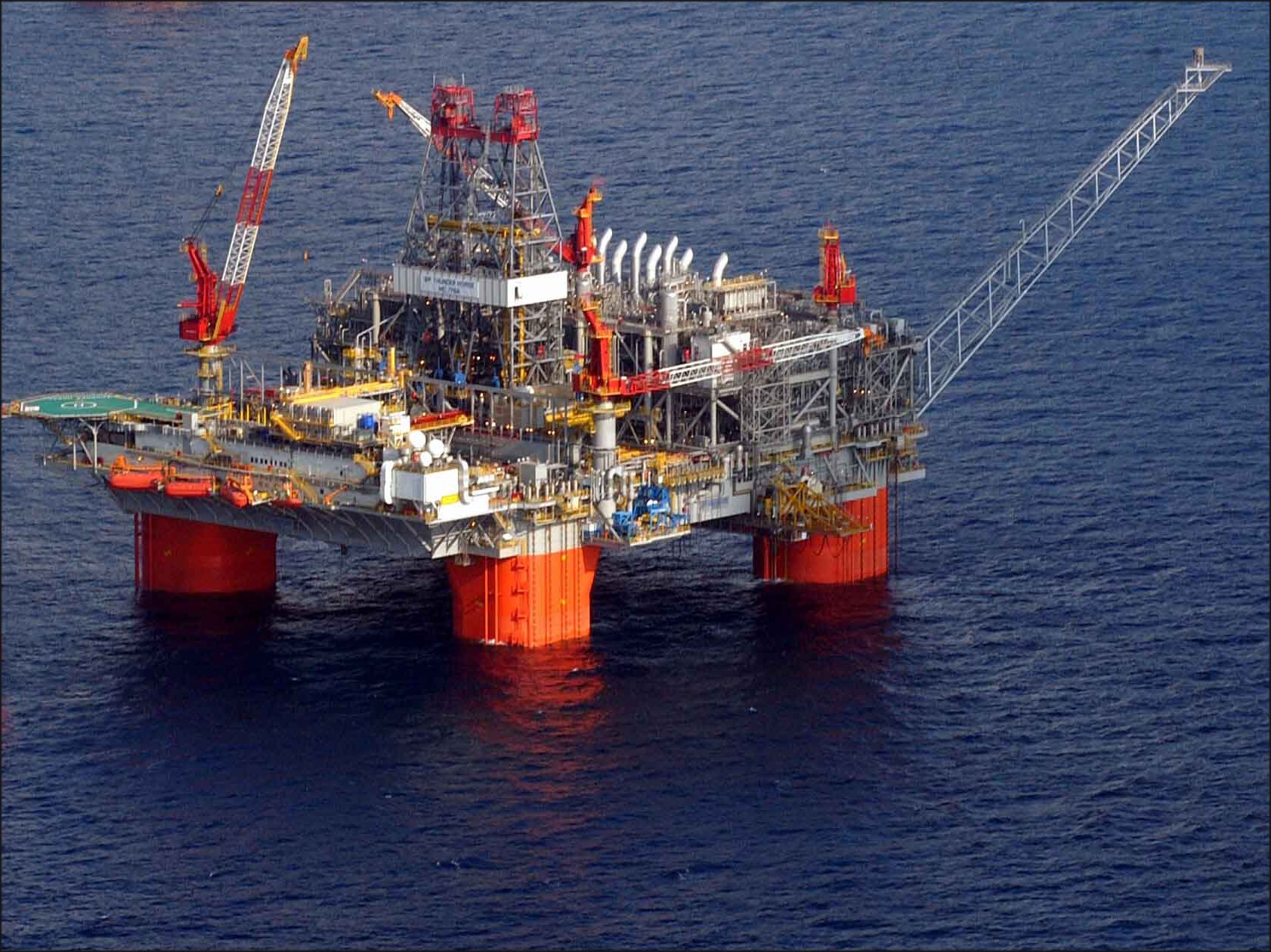
- Thunder Horse semi-submersible platform, July 2005

History
- Name: Thunder Horse PDQ
- Owner: BP plc (75%); ExxonMobil (25%)
- Operator: BP plc
- Port of registry: United States
- Builder: Daewoo Shipbuilding & Marine Engineering; Okpo, South Korea
- Cost: US$5 billion
- Laid down: 19 May 2003
- Launched: 2006
- Completed: 2005
- In service: First oil June 2008
- Identification: ABS class no.: 07113112; Call sign: WPXF501; MMSI number: 3660478
- Status: Operational 28.1091°N 88.4944°W

General characteristics
- Class & type: ABS: A1, column stabilized unit, floating offshore installation (FOI)
- Tonnage: 59,500 tonnes (65,600 tons)
- Displacement: 130,000 tonnes (140,000 tons)
- Length: 136 m (446 ft)
- Beam: 112 m (367 ft)
- Draught: 30 m (98 ft)
- Deck clearance: 17.5 m (57 ft)
- Installed power: 90 MW
- Capacity: Diesel fuel: 2,181.6 m^{3} (77,040 cu ft); Potable water: 2,926.1 m^{3} (103,330 cu ft); Lube oil: 549.5 m^{3} (19,410 cu ft); Ballast tank: 54,662.4 m^{3} (1,930,380 cu ft)
- Crew: 334

Thunder Horse PDQ is a BP plc and ExxonMobil joint venture semi-submersible oil platform on location over the Mississippi Canyon Thunder Horse Oil Field (Block 778/822), in deepwater Gulf of Mexico, 150 miles (240 km) southeast of New Orleans, moored in waters of 1,840 metres (6,040 ft). The "PDQ" identifies the platform as being a production and oil drilling facility with crew quarters.

Thunder Horse PDQ is the largest offshore installation of its kind in the world. The vessel's hull is of GVA design. The hull was built by Daewoo Shipbuilding & Marine Engineering (DSME) in Okpo, South Korea, then loaded aboard the heavy lift ship MV Blue Marlin and transported to Kiewit Offshore Services in Ingleside, Texas, where it was integrated with its topsides modules that were built in Morgan City, Louisiana. The 15,813 nautical miles (29,286 km; 18,197 mi) journey around the Cape of Good Hope took nine weeks (63 days), from 23 July to 23 September 2004.

== Hurricane Dennis ==
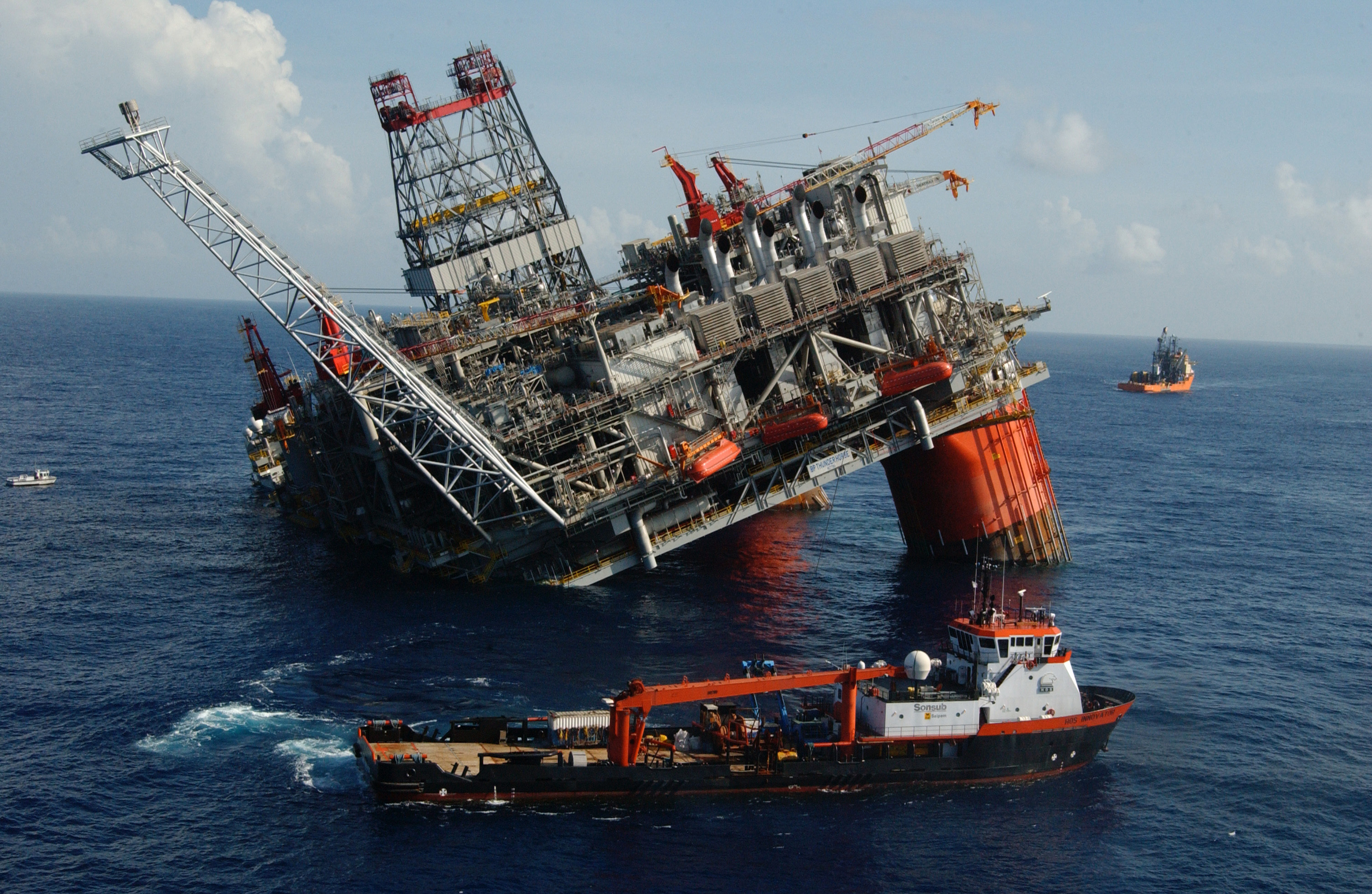
Thunder Horse listing after Hurricane Dennis.

Thunder Horse PDQ was evacuated with the approach of Hurricane Dennis in July 2005. After the hurricane passed, the platform fell into a 30 degree list and was in danger of foundering.

The platform was designed for a 100-year event, and inspection teams found no hull damage and no leaks through its hull. Rather, an incorrectly plumbed 6-inch length of pipe allowed water to flow freely among several ballast tanks that set forth a chain of events causing the platform to tip into the water. The platform was fully righted about a week after Dennis, delaying commercial production initially scheduled for late 2005. During repairs, it was discovered that the underwater manifold was severely cracked due to poorly welded pipes.

The platform took a nearly direct hit six weeks later from Hurricane Katrina, but was undamaged.

== See also ==
- Offshore oil and gas in the US Gulf of Mexico
- Oil fields operated by BP
