= Atlantis Oil Field =

Oil field in the Gulf of Mexico

Atlantis oil field
- Location within the United States
- Country: United States
- Region: Gulf of Mexico
- Location: Green Canyon
- Blocks: 699, 700, 742, 743, 744
- Offshore/onshore: Offshore
- Coordinates: 27.195278°N 90.026944°W
- Operator: BP
- Partners: BP (56%); Woodside Energy (44%)

Field history
- Discovery: 1998
- Start of production: October 2007

Production
- Estimated oil in place: 600 million barrels (~8.2×10^{7} t)

The Atlantis oil field is the third largest oil field in the Gulf of Mexico. The field was discovered in 1998 and is located at the Green Canyon blocks 699, 700, 742, 743, and 744 in United States federal waters in the Gulf of Mexico about 130 miles (210 km) from the coast of Louisiana. The oil field lies in water depths ranging from 4,400 to 7,100 feet (1,300 to 2,200 m). The subsea structure of Atlantis has long been the target of safety critics.

== Reserves ==
The Atlantis oil field has estimated ultimate reserves of about 600 million barrels (95×10^{6} m^{3}). The supermajor BP owns a 56% interest in the field in conjunction with Woodside Energy which owns a 44% interest.

== History ==
The oil field was discovered in 1998 by the Ocean America semi-submersible, mobile drilling rig operating in a water depth of 1,870 metres (6,140 ft). The discovery was later confirmed by wells drilled by GSF C.R. Luigs and Glomar Explorer. Production started in October 2007.

== Production ==
The field is expected to produce about 200,000 barrels per day (32,000 m^{3}/d) of oil and 180 million cubic feet per day (5,100,000 m^{3}/d) of gas.

The Atlantis field has been developed with a semi-submersible production platform, Atlantis PQ, designed by GVA Consultants and built by Daewoo Shipbuilding & Marine Engineering in South Korea. In addition to the semi-submersible platform, field development uses a network of wet-tree subsea wells.

The subsea elements of the Atlantis field were designed and fabricated by PS Fabricators. It is one of the largest to undergo systems integration testing (SIT) on land, also at PS Fabricators SIT site. This includes positioning the components as they would be positioned subsea, pressure testing, pig testing, etc. The system itself is rigorously tested to ensure its safety subsea.

== Safety practices ==
=== Food and Water Watch lawsuit ===
On 17 May 2010, consumer group Food & Water Watch, with former BP contractor Kenneth Abbott, filed a complaint in the United States district court, seeking to stop production on the platform Atlantis PQ until safety documents are produced. The suit was dropped by the plaintiff and re-file naming BP as a defendant, as required once BP became involved.

According to Food & Water Watch, BP failed to supplement its document production with new information regarding Atlantis's suspension the second quarter of 2012, which caused much of the company's $3.7 billion loss in profits that quarter.

=== US government scrutiny ===
The Deepwater Horizon drilling rig explosion has given new impetus to a number of Congressional Representatives to pressure the Minerals Management Service (MMS) to investigate safety practices on BP's Atlantis PQ offshore platform in the Atlantis Oil Field. A whistleblower report to the MMS in March 2009 stated, "over 85 percent of the Atlantis Project's Piping and Instrument drawings lacked final engineer-approval," as legally required. The report further stated, "the project be immediately shut down until those documents could be accounted for and independently verified." BP and other oil industry groups wrote letters objecting to a proposed MMS rule last year that would have required stricter safety measures. The MMS changed rules in April 2008 to exempt certain projects in the central Gulf region, allowing BP to operate in the Macondo Prospect without filing a blowout plan.
