= United States offshore drilling debate =

Ongoing debate in the United States

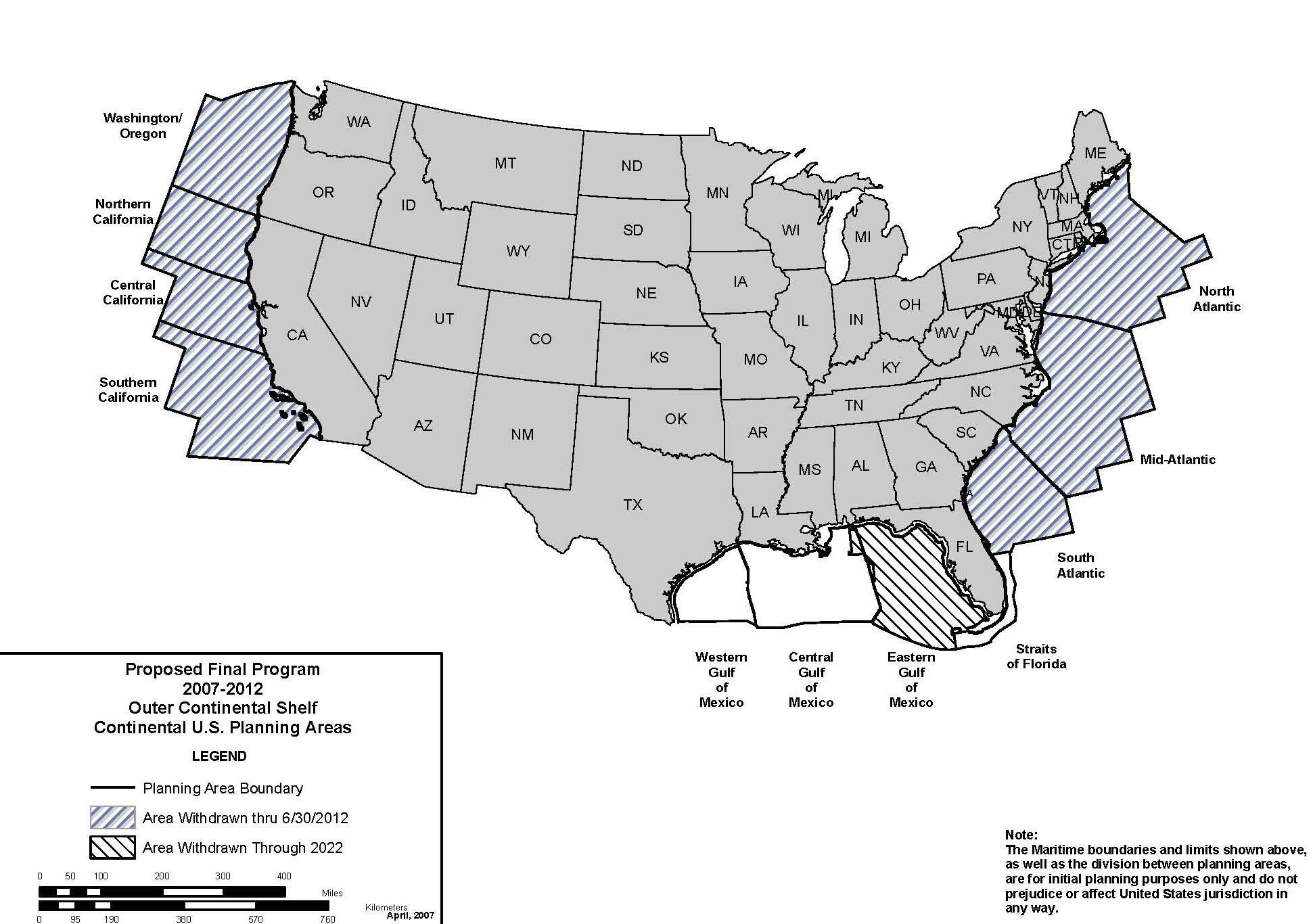
Federal offshore areas withdrawn from oil and gas leasing

The United States offshore drilling debate is an ongoing debate in the United States about whether, the extent to which, in which areas, and under what conditions, further offshore drilling should be allowed in U.S.-administered waters. It is being debated in terms of both environmental issues and U.S. energy independence.

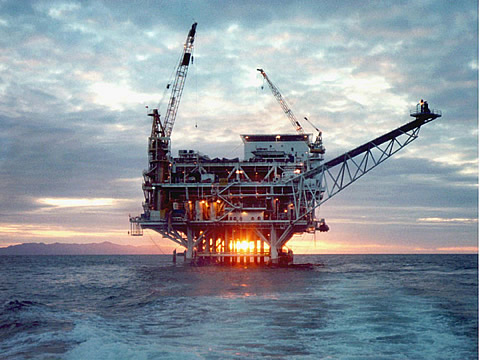
Oil drilling platform about two miles (3 km) off the coast of California, near Santa Barbara

In 1969 drilling bans were established for offshore California and Florida, and in 1990 President George H. W. Bush banned offshore drilling entirely. Nevertheless, offshore drilling continued in offshore Texas and Louisiana.

Offshore drilling became central in the 2008 presidential election, not least because of the oil price increases since 2003. George W. Bush lifted the oil drilling ban and also President Barack Obama was for limited offshore drilling. The Obama administration opened new areas in U.S. coastal waters to offshore drilling for gas and oil in March 2010, despite the recent Deepwater Horizon explosion and Deepwater Horizon oil spill in the Gulf of Mexico but rescinded the decision in November. In 2018, Trump launched an initiative to expand offshore drilling, excluding Florida. Under President Biden oil and gas leasing in certain arctic areas was prohibited as of 2023, but in January 2025, President Trump revoked that order.

== Legal background ==
As interpreted by the federal courts, the Commerce Clause of the United States Constitution gives the federal government certain regulatory power over "navigable waters" of the United States. The Submerged Lands Act of 1953 and Continental Shelf Lands Act of 1953, along with the 1960 Supreme Court decision in United States v. States of Louisiana, Texas, Mississippi, Alabama, and Florida, divided ownership of the tidelands of the United States between state and federal governments. States own the sea and seabed out to 3.5 miles (5.6 km), except Texas and Florida which own out to 10.5 miles (16.9 km). The federal government owns the remainder of the territorial waters.

== History ==
The 28 January 1969 blowout at a Unocal rig, which spilled 3 million US gallons (11,000 m^{3}) of petroleum off the coast of Santa Barbara, California, resulted in drilling bans in offshore California and Florida.

Offshore drilling continued in offshore Texas and Louisiana. In 2006, an 8,300,000-acre (34,000 km^{2}) area in the Gulf of Mexico known as lease 181 was opened for exploration.

The issue saw increased coverage when President George W. Bush, in July 2008, lifted a 1990 executive order by his father, President George H. W. Bush, banning offshore drilling, and called for drilling in the Arctic National Wildlife Refuge.

Offshore drilling became central in the 2008 presidential election, not least because of the oil price increases since 2003. It was also being debated in terms of both environmental issues and U.S. energy independence. As of September 2008, President Barack Obama was for limited offshore drilling as part of an extensive energy independence overhaul.

U.S. House Speaker Nancy Pelosi called Bush's energy policy "drill and veto". The Drill Responsibly in Leased Lands (DRILL) Act (H.R. 6515) was one of the bills discussed in the Congress about drilling. In Florida, many counties, cities, chambers of commerce, and other local agencies passed resolutions against oil drilling in Florida waters.

On March 31, 2010, President Obama announced that he was opening new areas in U.S. coastal waters to offshore drilling for gas and oil. This was in stark contrast to his reaction only a few weeks later to the Deepwater Horizon explosion and Deepwater Horizon oil spill in the Gulf of Mexico that became the biggest environmental disaster in US history. In November 2010, the Obama administration rescinded the decision to open new areas.

A moratorium on leasing on the Outer Continental Shelf expired in 2012, and a debate started on whether or not to extend it.

In 2018, a new federal initiative to expand offshore drilling suddenly excluded Florida, but although this would be favored by Floridians, concerns remained about the basis for that apparently arbitrary exception being merely politically motivated and tentative. No scientific, military, or economic basis for the decision was given, provoking continuing public concern in Florida.

In 2023, President Biden signed a Memorandum of March 13, 2023 prohibiting oil and gas leasing in certain arctic areas of the Outer Continental Shelf (Withdrawal of Certain Areas off the United States Arctic Coast of the Outer Continental Shelf from Oil or Gas Leasing). However, in January 2025, President Trump revoked that order, and opened up leases within the Arctic National Wildlife Refuge relating to the coastal plain oil and gas leasing program.

== Positive effects ==
=== Energy independence ===
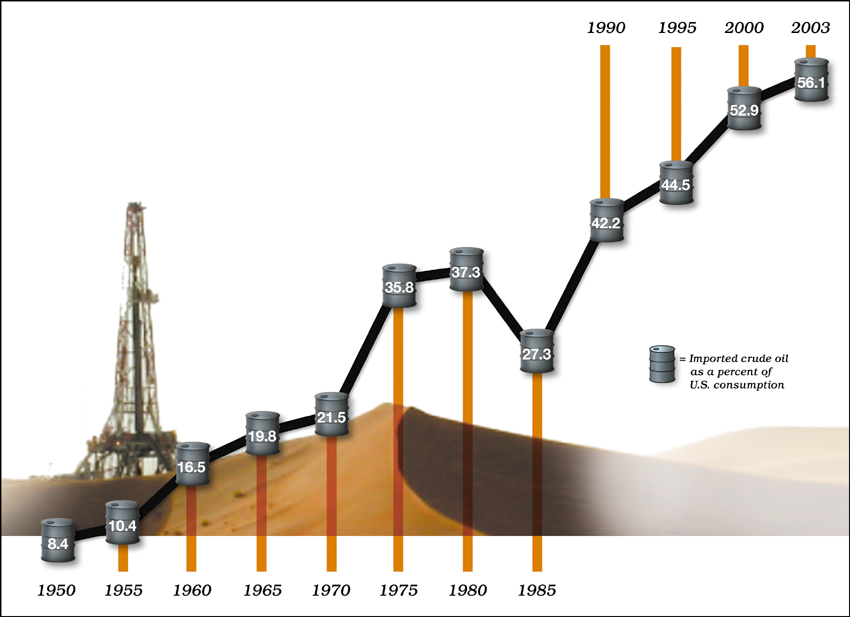
Imported crude oil as a percent of U.S. consumption

A common argument in favor of offshore drilling is it reduces United States dependency on imported oil. Geopolitically, the U.S. would be less vulnerable to sanctions by oil-producing countries hostile to the United States. It would also make the United States less vulnerable to a stop in a country's oil exports, due to, for example, a civil war or an invasion of that country. The debate often makes references to the 1973 oil crisis and 1979 energy crisis.

=== Fuel price ===
One argument for increased offshore drilling has been to reduce fuel prices. In 2007, the Energy Information Administration at the U.S. Dep. of Energy analyzed the effect of lifting the ban on oil and gas leasing on the Atlantic and Pacific coasts and the eastern Gulf of Mexico. With leasing beginning in 2012, the agency projected that production of oil would not be expected to start before 2017, and that as a result US oil production by 2030 would be 7% higher than it would be otherwise. The effect on fuel prices, however, would be "insignificant."

The Natural Resources Defense Council, an environmental advocacy group, estimated that with increased offshore leasing and drilling, the price of oil would only drop about 3–4 cents in 15 to 20 years.

=== Trade deficit ===
Oil produced from offshore drilling reduces oil imports, and thus lessens the U.S. trade deficit. From mid-2017 to early 2018, crude oil imports increased from $45 per barrel to $62 per barrel. Rising oil prices have driven some with U.S. oil stakeholders to argue all options must be considered to reduce the national deficit; including expanded national oil production.

== Negative effects ==
=== Military training ===
In 2005, U.S. Defense Secretary Donald Rumsfeld stated that offshore drilling would disrupt military training and weapons testing, if done in an area of the Gulf of Mexico along the coast of Florida.

=== International relations ===
Although offshore drilling has long been banned in federal waters off the state of Florida, Cuba has been drilling its own offshore area near Florida. The subject became an issue in the 2008 presidential race, with assertions and denials of the reality of Cuban offshore drilling. On 31 October 2008, Brazilian and Cuban presidents Luiz Inácio Lula da Silva and Raúl Castro attended a ceremony at which the Brazilian oil company Petrobras agreed to drill for oil in Cuban offshore waters near Florida. By May 2011 Petrobas had withdrawn from the agreement due to poor prospects.

In 2017, Russia began drilling in the Black Sea with a Chinese-made oil rig, Scarabeo 9. Since the rig wasn't built in the U.S. and was agreed to before the imposition of additional sanctions by the E.U. in 2014, Russia has been able to avoid sanctions and operate the rig.

=== Oil spills ===
Offshore facilities pose an environmental risk of oil spills. On April 20, 2010, an underwater blowout and subsequent explosion and fire destroyed the Deepwater Horizon rig owned by Transocean Ltd. and operating in the Gulf of Mexico under lease to energy giant BP, resulting in the largest oil spill in United States history. Five million barrels of oil were spilled into the Gulf of Mexico, leading to $21.5 billion (or $4300 per barrel) of clean-up costs paid by BP.

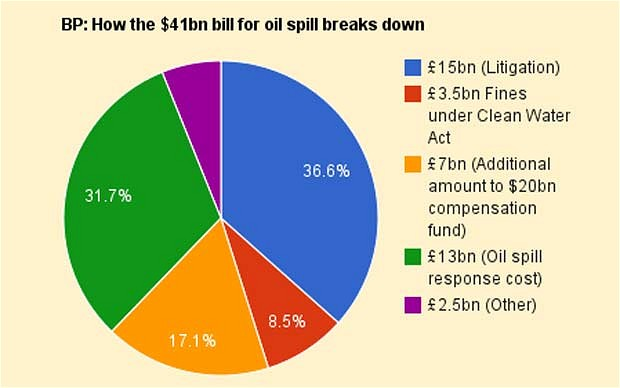
BP Oil spill costs broken down by category

=== Endangered species ===
As of 2010, the federal Minerals Management Service had given permission to BP and dozens of other oil companies to drill in the Gulf of Mexico without first getting required permits that assesses threats to endangered species.

In the aftermath of the Deepwater Horizon explosion, aka BP Oil spill, Defenders of Wildlife and the Southern Environmental Law Center sued BP for imperiling 32 threatened or endangered species. These included the sperm whale, gulf sturgeon, manatee and five kinds of sea turtles, in addition to the surrounding water and habitats that were damaged. With every oil spill, endangered species in the area get closer to extinction.

== Public opinion ==
Polls by independent national polling concerns in the US generally show fluctuating public opinions of offshore drilling in the last decade.

The Pew Research Center, which had documented a large and sharp drop in support for allowing more offshore drilling following the Deepwater Horizon spill in 2010 (down to 44% in favor versus 52% against), found that by March 2012, support for increased offshore drilling had returned to its pre-Deepwater Horizon level, with 65% in favor versus 31% against.

A series of CNN polls 2008-2011 showed that support for increased offshore drilling dropped from 75% before the Deepwater Horizon spill to 57% shortly after. By April 2011, support had increased to 69%, versus 31% opposed.

The Gallup organization found 50% support for increased offshore drilling in May 2010, a month after the Deepwater Horizon explosion. By March 2011, that support had increased to 60% in favor versus 37% opposed.

A 2018 Pew Research Center study found that 51% of Americans opposed expanded offshore oil rigs versus 42% favoring expanded offshore oil rigs. This represented a 10% decline in those favoring offshore oil rigs since 2014. Generally, people who live within 25 miles of the coastline oppose offshore oil drilling more so than those who live farther from the coast. Also, Democrats oppose additional rig development at a rate of 71%, while only 22% of Democrats favor more offshore oil rigs. On the other hand, 70% of Republicans favor increased offshore drilling in comparison to 25% opposition. Lastly, younger people (aged 18–49) oppose increased offshore drilling at a rate of 58%, compared to only 42% opposition for people aged older than 49.

== See also ==
- Arctic Refuge drilling controversy
- "Drill, baby, drill", a Republican campaign slogan originally used at the 2008 Republican National Convention
- Offshore drilling
- Offshore oil and gas in the United States
- United States oil politics
- Environmental issues in the United States
- Offshore Energy and Jobs Act (H.R. 2231; 113th Congress) - a 2013 proposed bill that would revise policy regarding offshore drilling in the United States
