= Green Canyon =

Area in the Gulf of Mexico

Green Canyon (the United States)

Green Canyon is an area in the Gulf of Mexico that is rich in oil fields and under the jurisdiction of the Bureau of Ocean Energy Management. Among other oil fields Green Canyon consist of Atlantis (blocks 699, 700, 742, 743, and 744) operated by BP, Marco Polo (block 608) and K2 (blocks 518 and 562) operated by Anadarko Petroleum, Manatee (block 155) operated by Shell, Shenzi (blocks 609, 610, 653, and 654) operated by BHP, Droshky (block 244) operated by ConocoPhillips, and Tahiti (blocks 596, 597, 640 and 641) operated by Chevron.

Block 185 of Green Canyon is known as Bush Hill and is a well known cold seep with a wide array of tube worms. This area was the first place in the Gulf of Mexico where gas hydrates were recovered in piston cores.

Additionally, like most of the Gulf of Mexico, there is a significant amount of salt tectonics.

Blocks in this protraction area are defined in UTM zone 15 north in feet.

== Climate ==
As recorded by a station in Block 184, the air above Green Canyon has a tropical rainforest climate (Köppen climate classification Af), with warm winters and extremely oppressive summers and very low diurnal temperature variation year-round (especially in summer), expected for its location far from any landmasses. Experiencing the purest Gulf influences possible, Green Canyon's summer nighttime low temperatures are some of the highest on Earth for any non-arid location, at least counting those on land. Temperatures below freezing are unknown.

The hot, humid air and warm water during summer and autumn can facilitate the development and sustainment of tropical cyclones, specifically Atlantic hurricanes, the water having surface temperatures above 26 °C (78.8 °F)—the typical threshold for tropical development—from May 25 to October 31 on average, and reaching a maximum of 30 °C (86 °F) on August 5. Precipitation is relatively evenly distributed throughout the year, peaking in late summer at the height of the hurricane season, having a secondary peak in winter, and reaching its nadir in late spring.

Climate data for Green Canyon 184 (27.767°N 91.517°W)
Month	Jan	Feb	Mar	Apr	May	Jun	Jul	Aug	Sep	Oct	Nov	Dec	Year
Mean daily maximum °F (°C)	69.1 (20.6)	69.4 (20.8)	72.1 (22.3)	75.6 (24.2)	80.6 (27.0)	85.5 (29.7)	88.2 (31.2)	88.3 (31.3)	85.7 (29.8)	81.2 (27.3)	76.1 (24.5)	71.9 (22.2)	78.6 (25.9)
Daily mean °F (°C)	65.9 (18.8)	66.6 (19.2)	69.8 (21.0)	73.7 (23.2)	78.9 (26.1)	83.7 (28.7)	86.2 (30.1)	86.4 (30.2)	84.0 (28.9)	79.1 (26.2)	73.5 (23.1)	68.9 (20.5)	76.4 (24.7)
Mean daily minimum °F (°C)	62.6 (17.0)	63.7 (17.6)	67.6 (19.8)	71.9 (22.2)	77.1 (25.1)	81.8 (27.7)	84.1 (28.9)	84.5 (29.2)	82.4 (28.0)	77.0 (25.0)	70.9 (21.6)	65.5 (18.6)	74.1 (23.4)
Average precipitation inches (mm)	3.90 (99)	3.11 (79)	3.53 (90)	3.02 (77)	2.96 (75)	4.08 (104)	4.35 (110)	4.72 (120)	4.61 (117)	3.71 (94)	3.49 (89)	3.90 (99)	45.38 (1,153)
Source: Integration of Weatherspark data.
