= GMF =

GMF may refer to:

- Galactic magnetic field
- Garantie Mutuelle des Fonctionnaires, now part of Covéa, a French insurance company
- General mail facility
- General Motors Foundation, an American philanthropic organization
- Genetically modified food
- German Marshall Fund, an American public policy institution
- Glia maturation factor
- Global Mayors' Forum, an international conference
- GMF AeroAsia, an Indonesian aircraft-maintenance company
- GM Financial, an American financial services company
- Graphical Modeling Framework, a framework within the Eclipse platform
- Ground Mobile Forces, a military communications system
- Gulf of Mexico Foundation
- "GMF", a 2013 song by American musician John Grant
- Glucosyloxymethylfurfural, a glycosylated derivative of hydroxymethylfurfural
