= Gulf of Mexico =

Marginal sea of the Atlantic Ocean

- Golfo de México (Note: Usually, in Spanish, the name of the country is spelled México; however, in Peninsular (European) Spanish, the variant Méjico is used alongside the usual version. According to the Diccionario panhispánico de dudas by the Royal Spanish Academy and Association of Academies of the Spanish Language, the version with J is also correct; however, the spelling with X is recommended, as it is the one used in Mexico.)
- Interactive map of Gulf of Mexico
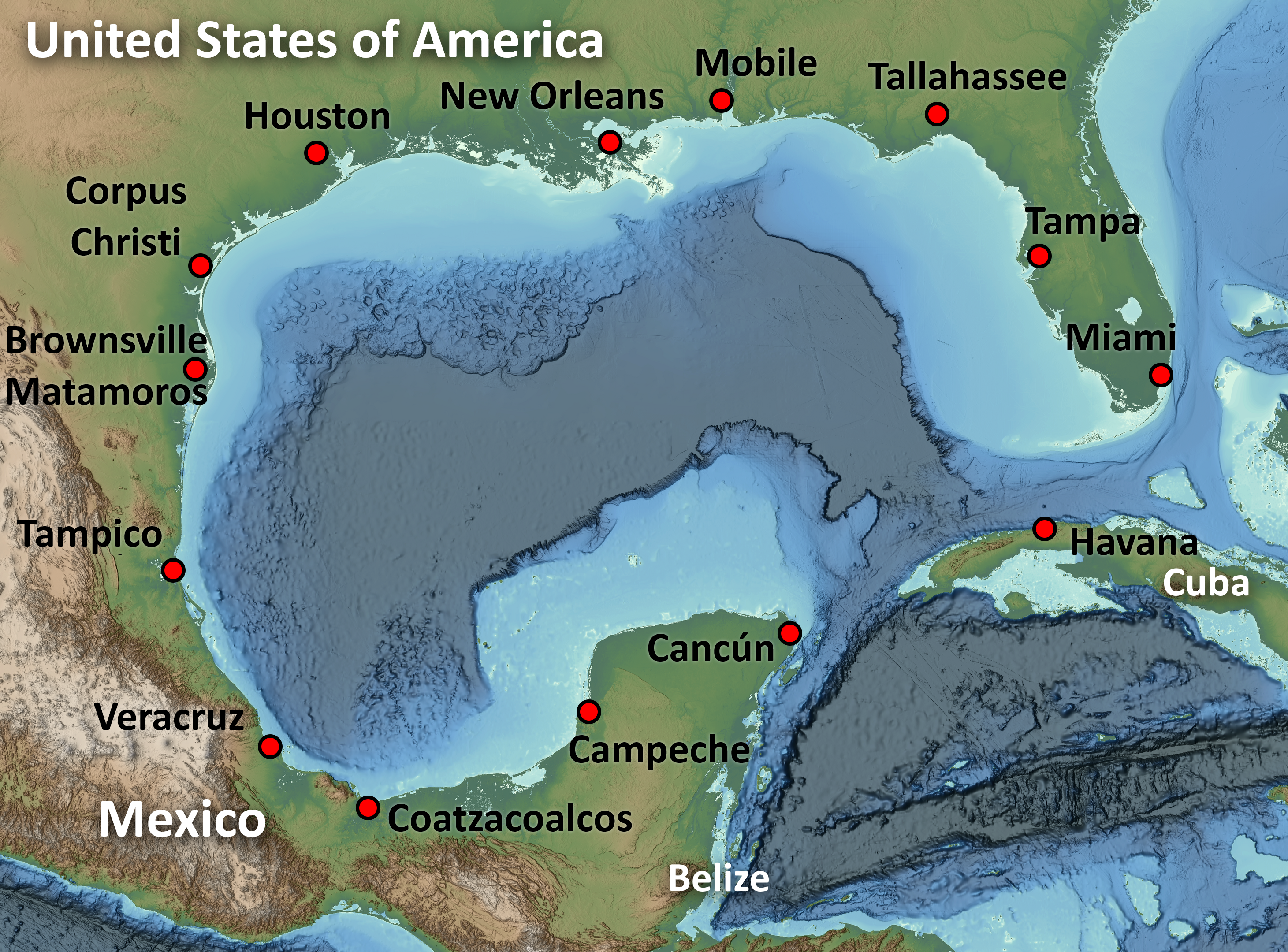
- Bathymetry of the Gulf of Mexico
- Location: American Mediterranean Sea
- Coordinates: 25°N 90°W
- River sources: Rio Grande, Mississippi River, Mobile River, Panuco River, Jamapa River, Pascagoula River, Tecolutla River, Usumacinta River, Apalachicola River
- Ocean/sea sources: Atlantic Ocean, Caribbean Sea
- Basin countries: Cuba; Mexico; United States of America
- Max. width: 1,500 km (930 mi)
- Surface area: 1,550,000 km^{2} (600,000 mi^{2})
- Average depth: 1,615 m (5,299 ft)
- Max. depth: 3,750 to 4,384 m (12,303 to 14,383 ft)
- Settlements: United States: Houston, New Orleans, Corpus Christi, Tampa, Southwest Florida, Mobile, Gulfport, Brownsville, Key West; Mexico: Veracruz, Cancún, Ciudad del Carmen, Coatzacoalcos, Matamoros, Tampico; Cuba: Havana, Mariel

The Gulf of Mexico (Spanish: Golfo de México) is an oceanic basin and a marginal sea of the Atlantic Ocean, mostly surrounded by the North American continent. It is bounded on the northeast, north, and northwest by the Gulf Coast of the United States; on the southwest and south by the Mexican states of Tamaulipas, Veracruz, Tabasco, Campeche, Yucatán, and Quintana Roo; and on the southeast by Cuba.

The Gulf of Mexico basin is roughly oval and is about 810 nautical miles (1,500 kilometers; 930 miles) wide. Its floor consists of sedimentary rocks and recent sediments. It is connected to part of the Atlantic Ocean through the Straits of Florida between the U.S. and Cuba, and with the Caribbean Sea via the Yucatán Channel between Mexico and Cuba. The Gulf of Mexico has relatively narrow connections to the Atlantic Ocean, which causes only very small tidal ranges to occur. Moisture from the Gulf of Mexico also contributes to weather across the United States, including severe weather in Tornado Alley.

The size of the gulf basin is about 1.6 million square kilometers (620,000 square miles). Almost half of the basin consists of shallow continental shelf waters. The volume of water in the basin is roughly 2.4 million cubic kilometers (580 thousand cubic miles). The gulf is one of the largest offshore petroleum production regions in the world, making up 14% of the total production of crude oil for the United States.

== Name ==
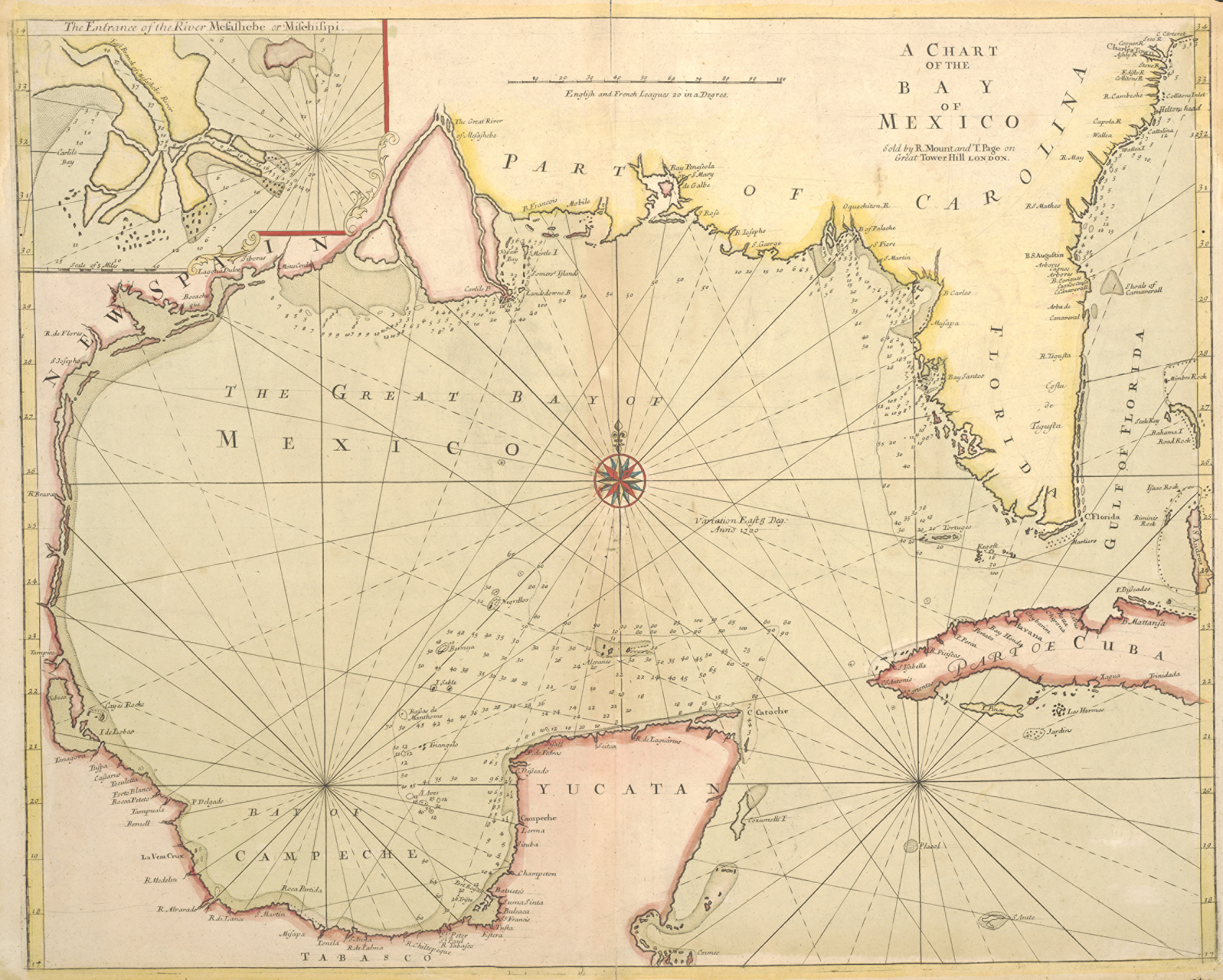
English nautical chart from 1700 labels the Gulf as "the Great Bay of Mexico"

As with the name of Mexico, the gulf's name is associated with the ethnonym Mexica, which refers to the Nahuatl-speaking people of the Valley of Mexico better known as the Aztecs. In Aztec religion, the gulf was called Chalchiuhtlicueyecatl, or "house of Chalchiuhtlicue", after the deity of the seas. Believing that the sea and sky merged beyond the horizon, they called the seas ilhuicaatl, meaning "sky water", contrasting them with finite, landlocked bodies of water, such as lakes. The Maya civilization, which used the gulf as a major trade route, likely called the gulf nahá, meaning "great water".

Up to 1530, European maps depicted the gulf, though left it unlabeled. Hernán Cortés called it "Sea of the North" (Spanish: Mar del Norte) in his dispatches, while other Spanish explorers called it the "Gulf of Florida" (Golfo de Florida) or "Gulf of Cortés" (Golfo de Cortés). A 1584 map by Abraham Ortelius also labeled it as the "Sea of the North" (Mare de Nort). Other early European maps called it the "Gulf of St. Michael" (Latin: Sinus S. Michaelis), "Gulf of Yucatán" (Golfo de Iucatan), "Yucatán Sea" (Mare Iuchatanicum), "Great Antillean Gulf" (Sinus Magnus Antillarum), "Cathayan Sea" (Mare Cathaynum), or "Gulf of New Spain" (Spanish: Golfo de Nueva España). At one point, New Spain encircled the gulf, with the Spanish Main extending into what later became Mexico and the southeastern United States.

The name "Gulf of Mexico" (Spanish: golfo de México; French: golphe du Mexique, later golfe du Mexique) first appeared on a world map in 1550 and in a historical account in 1552. As with other large bodies of water, Europeans named the gulf after Mexico, land of the Mexica, because mariners needed to cross the gulf to reach that destination. This name has been the most common name since the mid-17th century, when it was still considered a Spanish sea. French Jesuits used this name as early as 1672. In the 18th century, Spanish admiralty charts similarly labeled the gulf as "Mexican Cove" or "Mexican Sound" (Ensenada Mexicana or Seno Mexicano). Until the Republic of Texas broke away from Mexico in 1836, Mexico's coastal boundary extended eastward along the gulf to present-day Louisiana.

Among the other languages of Mexico, the gulf is known as Ayollohco Mexihco in Nahuatl, u golfoil México in Yucatec Maya, and golfo yu'un México in Tzotzil. Although there is no formal protocol on the general naming of international waters, Gulf of Mexico is officially recognized by the International Hydrographic Organization, which seeks to standardize the names of international maritime features for certain purposes and counts all three countries adjacent to the gulf as member states.

In a January 2025 executive order, U.S. president Donald Trump directed federal agencies and the U.S. Board on Geographic Names (BGN) to rename that part of the gulf lying over the United States continental shelf, up to the maritime boundaries with Mexico and Cuba, to the "Gulf of America". (Note: While the executive order specified an area of the U.S. continental shelf "extending to the seaward boundary with Mexico and Cuba", the Geographic Names Information System (GNIS) and the GEOnet Names Server (GNS) were modified to explicitly refer to the gulf as a whole, without distinguishing territorial waters or the continental shelf.) Some major online map services and several U.S.-based conservative media outlets voluntarily adopted the change for their U.S. users but kept the original name for users in Mexico and include both names for other foreign users. In 2026, Alabama passed an act requiring state employees to use the new name. Otherwise its reach has been limited. It did stoke controversy with Mexican president Claudia Sheinbaum and others objecting to the declaration. A February 2025 poll by Marquette University found that among 1,018 respondents across the U.S., 71% opposed renaming the Gulf of Mexico and 29% supported the name change.

== Extent ==
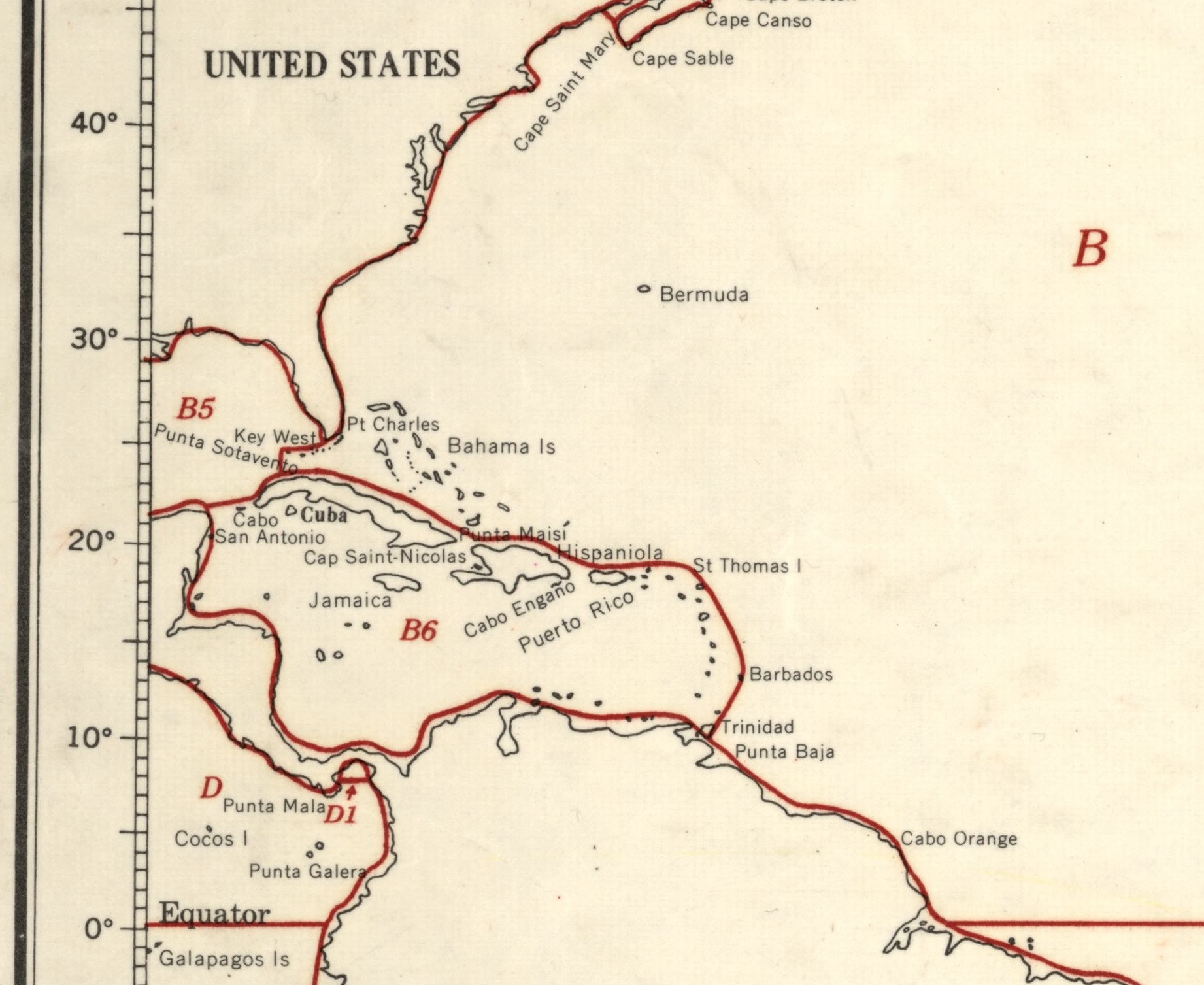
IHO map of the Gulf (B5) bordered by the Caribbean Sea (B6), Atlantic Ocean (B), United States, Cuba, and Mexico (unlabeled)

The International Hydrographic Organization publication Limits of Oceans and Seas (Note: 3rd edition, published in 1953. S-23 (Special Publication No. 23)) defines the southeast limit of the Gulf of Mexico as:

A line joining Cape Catoche Light (21°37′N 87°04′W) with the Light on Cape San Antonio in Cuba, through this island to the meridian of 83°W and to the Northward along this meridian to the latitude of the South point of the Dry Tortugas (24°35′N), along this parallel Eastward to Rebecca Shoal (82°35′W) thence through the shoals and Florida Keys to the mainland at the eastern end of Florida Bay and all the narrow waters between the Dry Tortugas and the mainland being considered to be within the Gulf.

== Population ==
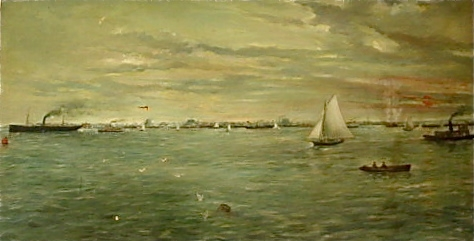
The Harbor at Galveston, by Verner Moore White (1863–1923)

The Gulf Coast of the United States, or Gulf Coastal Region, is composed of parts of the five U.S. states bordering the Gulf. In 2016, the total population of the region was 15.8 million people.

The six Mexican states that border the Gulf have a total population of 19.1 million people.

The three westernmost provinces of Cuba, including Havana, border the Gulf and have a combined population of 3,211,000.

Historically, there has also been significant human habitation within the gulf due to industrial activity. By 1975, 400 offshore drilling rigs in the gulf hosted a temporary population of more than 10,000 workers on any given day, who were rotated on a weekly staggered schedule. Increasing automation later led to a decline in the offshore worker population.

== Geology ==
The Gulf of Mexico began to form in the Late Triassic, about 215 million years ago, as a result of plate tectonics. The consensus among geologists is that before the late Triassic, the Gulf of Mexico did not exist. Before the late Triassic, the area consisted of dry land, which included continental crust that now underlies Yucatán, within the middle of the supercontinent Pangaea. This land lay south of a continuous mountain range that extended from north-central Mexico, through the Marathon Uplift in west Texas and the Ouachita Mountains of Arkansas and Oklahoma, and to Alabama where it linked directly to the Appalachian Mountains. It was created by the collision of continental plates that formed Pangaea. As interpreted by Roy Van Arsdale and Randel T. Cox, this mountain range was breached in the late Cretaceous by the formation of the Mississippi Embayment.

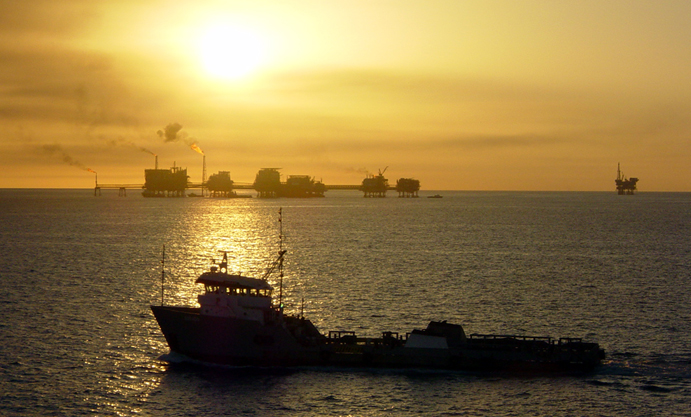
Ship and oil rigs in the gulf (2002)

The rifting that created the basin was associated with zones of weakness within Pangaea, including sutures where the Laurentia, South American, and African plates collided to create it. Firstly, there was a late Triassic–early Jurassic phase of rifting during which rift valleys formed and filled with continental red beds. Secondly, the continental crust was stretched and thinned as rifting progressed through the early and middle Jurassic times. This thinning created a broad zone of transitional crust, which displays modest and uneven thinning with block faulting and a broad zone of uniformly thinned transitional crust, which is half the typical 40 km (25-mile) thickness of continental crust. At this time, rifting first created a connection to the Pacific Ocean across central Mexico and later eastwards to the Atlantic Ocean. This flooded the opening basin to create an enclosed marginal sea. The subsiding transitional crust was blanketed by the widespread deposition of Louann Salt and associated anhydrite evaporites. During the late Jurassic, continued rifting widened the basin and progressed to the point that seafloor spreading and formation of oceanic crust occurred. At this point, sufficient circulation with the Atlantic Ocean was established that the deposition of Louann Salt ceased. Seafloor spreading stopped at the end of the Jurassic, about 145–150 million years ago.

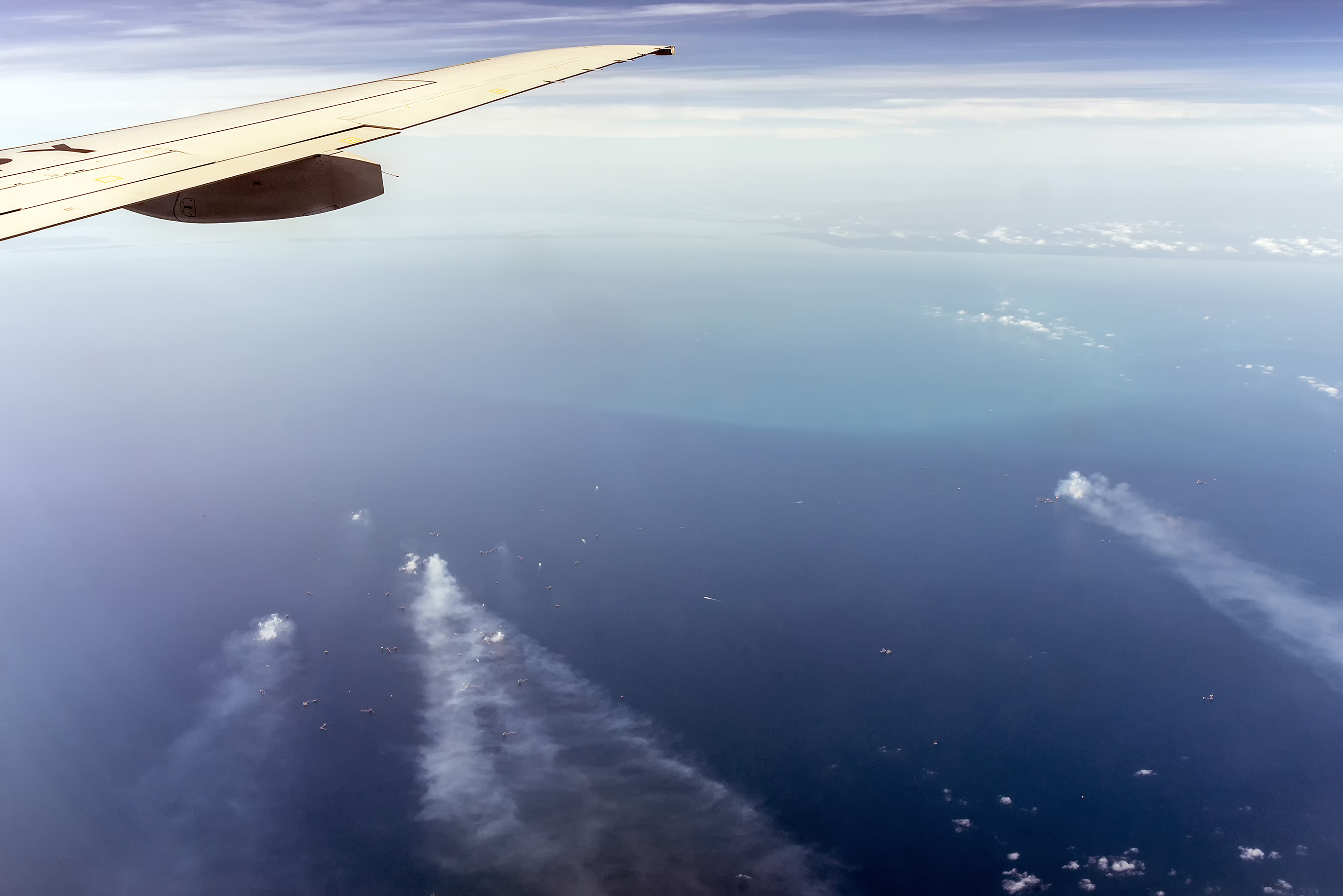
Cantarell Field (2015)

During the late Jurassic through early Cretaceous, the basin experienced a period of cooling and subsidence of the crust underlying it. The subsidence resulted from crustal stretching, cooling, and loading. Initially, the crustal stretching and cooling combination caused about 5–7 km (3.1–4.3 miles) of tectonic subsidence of the central thin transitional and oceanic crust. The basin expanded and deepened because subsidence occurred faster than sediment could fill it.

Later, loading of the crust within the basin and adjacent coastal plain by the accumulation of kilometers of sediments during the rest of the Mesozoic and all of the Cenozoic further depressed the underlying crust to its current position about 10–20 km (6.2–12.4 miles) below sea level. Particularly during the Cenozoic, a time of relative stability for the coastal zones, thick clastic wedges built out the continental shelf along the northwestern and northern margins of the basin.

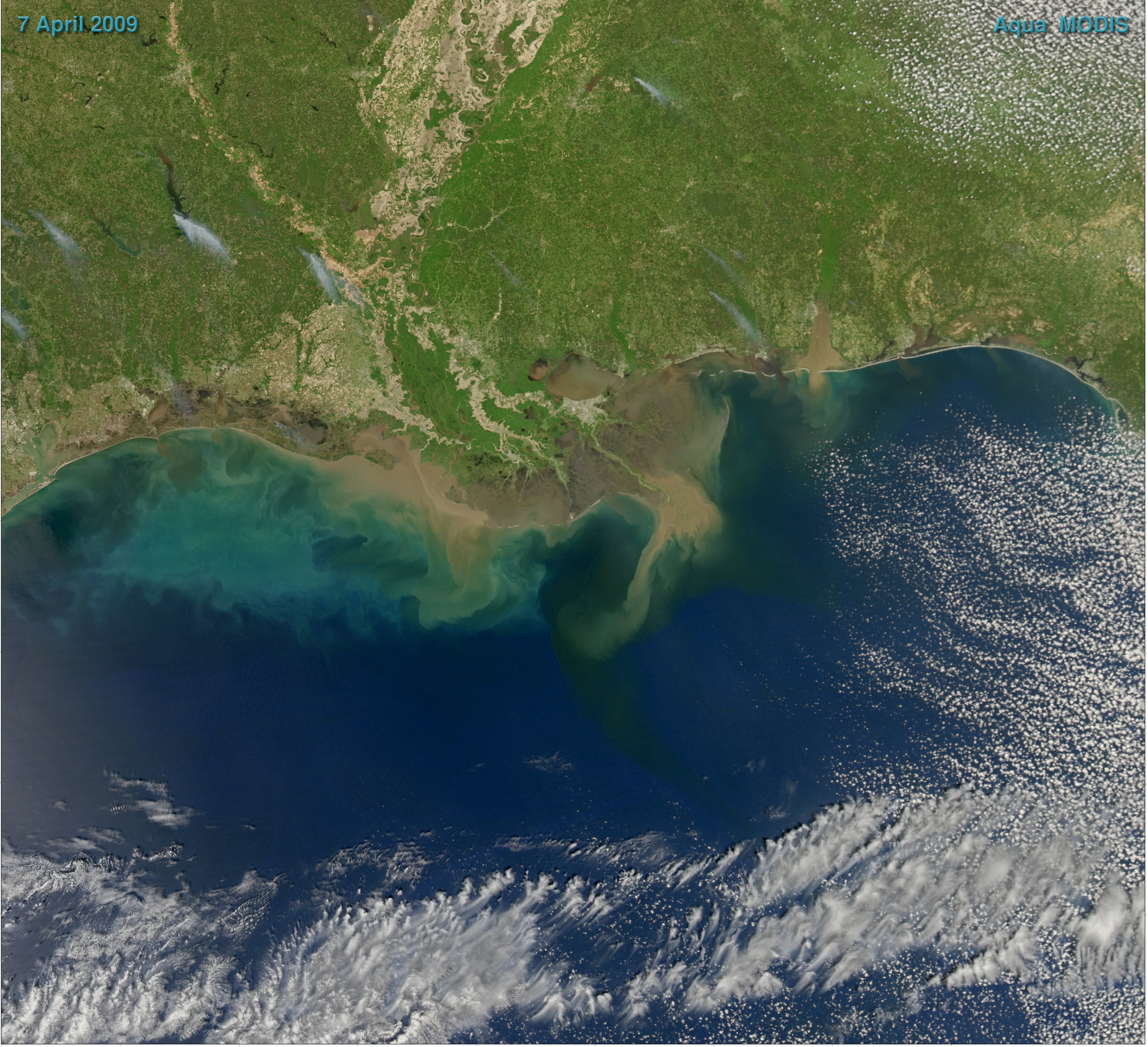
Sediment-laden water pours into the northern Gulf of Mexico from the Atchafalaya River (2009)

To the east, the stable Florida Platform was not covered by the sea until the latest Jurassic or the beginning of Cretaceous time. The Yucatán Platform was emergent until the mid-Cretaceous. After both platforms were submerged, the formation of carbonates and evaporites has delineated the geologic history of these two stable areas. Most of the basin was rimmed during the early Cretaceous by carbonate platforms, and its western flank was involved during the latest Cretaceous and early Paleogene periods in a compressive deformation episode, the Laramide Orogeny, which created the Sierra Madre Oriental of eastern Mexico.

The Gulf of Mexico is 41% continental slope, 32% continental shelf, and 24% abyssal plain, with the greatest depth of 12,467 feet in the Sigsbee Deep.

Seven main areas are given as:

- Gulf of Mexico basin; contains the Sigsbee Deep.
- Northeast Gulf of Mexico; extends from a point east of the Mississippi River Delta near Biloxi to the eastern side of Apalachee Bay.
- South Florida Continental Shelf and Slope; extends along the coast from Apalachee Bay to the Straits of Florida and includes the Florida Keys and Dry Tortugas.
- Campeche Bank; extends from the Yucatán Straits in the east to the Tabasco–Campeche Basin in the west and includes Arrecife Alacran.
- Bay of Campeche; a bight extending from the western edge of Campeche Bank to the offshore regions east of Veracruz.
- Western Gulf of Mexico; located between Veracruz to the south and the Rio Grande to the north.
- Northwest Gulf of Mexico; extends from Alabama to the Rio Grande.

=== Brine pools ===
A number of brine pools, sometimes called brine lakes, are known on the seafloor of the northern half of the Gulf of Mexico. Brine pools in the Gulf of Mexico range from just 1 meter (3 ft 3 in) across to 20 kilometers (12 mi) long. Brine is produced wherever the water of the Gulf comes in contact with the Louann Salt, an evaporite formation from the Jurassic period, along faults or in unconsolidated sediments. The Louann Salt extends under most of the continental shelf around the northern part of the Gulf from west of Florida to Texas. Under the pressure of overlaying sediments, the salt deforms and migrates, a process known as salt tectonics. Masses of salt may rise through overlaying sediments to form salt domes, or may be extruded along the Sigsbee Escarpment where the slope of the continental shelf exposes lower laying stata.

The brines usually exceed 200 parts-per-thousand (ppt) of salt and are 25% or more denser than most seawater (average 35 ppt). The density difference inhibits mixing of the brine with other sea water, and the brine flows downslope and gathers in depressions in the gulf floor. Hydrocarbons and gas hydrates rising from salt diapirs may cause doming of the gulf floor, with the gas sometimes erupting strongly enough to leave a depression in the gulf floor surrounded by a rim, where brine may pool. The East Flower Garden Bank brine pool is in a crater formed by the collapsed cap of a salt dome. The circular pool covers 500 square meters (5,400 sq ft) with a maximum depth of 25 centimeters (9.8 in), and is 70 meters (230 ft) beneath the surface of the Gulf. It is anoxic and contain quantities of hydrogen sulfide and methane.

The brine pool known as GB425, which is 600 meters (2,000 ft) deep, is fed by a mud volcano. The temperature at the surface of the pool can vary from 6 to 48 °C (43 to 118 °F), and is on average 20 °C (68 °F) warmer than normal bottom temperatures. The brine pool known as GC233 is at a depth similar to that of GB425, 650 meters (2,130 ft) deep. The pool sits in a depression at the top of a mound and covers about 190 square meters (2,000 sq ft). Although GC233 has a lower inflow of brine than GB425 and a temperature about 15 °C (59 °F) below that of GB425, the two pools share some similarities, such as a salinity of about 130 ppt, low sulfides, almost no sulfates, and high concentrations of hydrocarbons.

The Orca Basin is 2,100 meters (6,900 ft) deep, and covers about 400 square kilometers (150 sq mi) with a maximum depth of 350 meters (1,150 ft). The large size is the result of the merger of several salt domes. Salinity in the pool increases gradually over a depth of 75 meters (246 ft), and reaches 300 ppt at depth, with zero dissolved oxygen.

A brine pool was discovered in 2014 on the sea floor at a depth of 1,000 meters (3,300 ft) with a circumference of 30 meters (100 ft) and depth of 4 meters (12 ft), which is four to five times saltier than the surrounding water. The site cannot sustain any kind of life other than bacteria, mussels with a symbiotic relationship, tube worms, and certain kinds of shrimp. It has been called the "Jacuzzi of Despair" because it is warmer at 18 °C (65 °F) compared to the surrounding water at 4 °C (39 °F).

== Hydrology ==
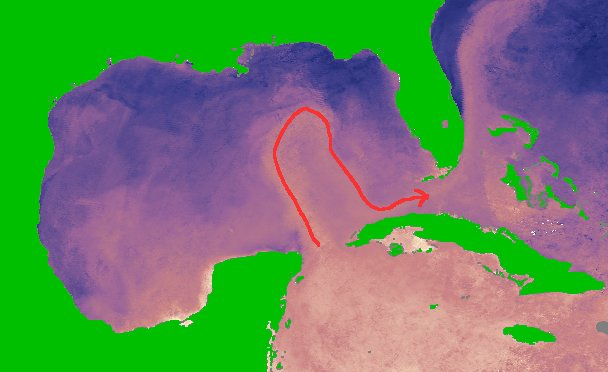
The Loop Current flows northward between Cuba and the Yucatán Peninsula.

Circulation of water in and through the Gulf is part of the larger circulation patterns of the Atlantic Ocean. Water flows into the Gulf from the Caribbean Sea through the Yucatan Channel as the Yucatan Current, and exits to the North Atlantic Ocean through the Florida Straits as the Florida Current, which becomes the Gulf Stream. Movement through the two straits is confined to the upper layers of ocean water, as the Yucatan Strait has a maximum depth of only 1,800 meters (5,900 ft), while the Florida Straits has a maximum depth of only 900 meters (3,000 ft).

The Yucatan Current fills most of the Yucatan Channel to a depth of up to 800 meters (2,600 ft), with a maximum flow of 120 centimeters (47 in) per second. There are weaker countercurrents along the coasts of Cuba and Yucatan and below the main current. The average volumetric flow rate through the Yucatan Channel varied between 15.8 and 28.1 Sverdrups (1 cubic hectometer per second) from 1999 to 2013. The Florida Current fills all of the Florida Straits (at approximately 81°W, between the lower Florida Keys and Cuba) to a depth of 800 meters (2,600 ft), with a maximum flow of 110 centimeters (43 in) per second. The average volumetric flow rate through the Florida Straits varied between 27.2 and 27.9 Sverdrups.

The Yucatan Current is connected to the Florida Current by an anti-cyclonic (clockwise) loop of variable size, the Loop Current. The Loop Current may extend into the northeastern part of the Gulf, and may flow over the continental shelf along the west coast of the Florida peninsula. The Loop Current is as strong as the Gulf Stream and dominates the Gulf. Anti-cyclonic and cyclonic (anti-clockwise) rings or eddies are shed from the Loop Current and move into the western Gulf. Cyclonic and anti-cyclonic eddies form pairs, and such pairs of eddies often dominate circulation in the western Gulf.

The Loop Current is up to 300 kilometers (190 mi) in diameter and is surrounded by small cyclonic (anti-clockwise) eddies. Large warm-core rings or eddies are shed off the Loop Current at irregular intervals. The Loop Current can be seen in satellite images using both sea surface temperatures and Sea surface height. On the east side of the Gulf, a weak countercurrent flows north along the continental slope of the Florida peninsula. In the Northeast corner of the Gulf there is a weak cyclonic circulation over the continental shelf. The strength of this circulation is inversely proportional to how far north the Loop Current extends.

The Loop Current is part of the North Atlantic Gyre, an ocean current circulation that includes the Gulf Stream, North Atlantic Current, Canary Current, and North Equatorial Current. The eddies shed by the Loop Current spread though the Gulf, affecting the circulation in almost all parts of the Gulf. The creation of the eddies is a variable and often complex process, influenced in part by how far the Loop Currents has penetrated into the Gulf. Eddies shed by the Loop Current sometimes reattach to the Loop Current. Eddies surrounding the Loop Current react interactively with it, affecting both the penetration of the loop into the Gulf, and the size and number of eddies shed by the loop.

Rings or eddies shed from the Loop Current may be up to 300 kilometers (190 mi) in diameter and 800 to 1,000 meters (2,600 to 3,300 ft) deep. The outer currents in the ring may flow at up to 4 knots (7.4 km/h; 4.6 mph), while the rings as a whole move westward at about 0.20 knots (0.37 km/h; 0.23 mph).

The water flowing into the Gulf from the Caribbean Sea is not homogenous. About 40% is from the South Atlantic Ocean, and is warmer and fresher than the rest of the water. The South Atlantic component is distinguishable in the upper 100 meters (330 ft) of the left hand and central parts of the Florida Current. Another component in the deeper part of the current is Antarctic Intermediate Water. The rest of the water carried into the Gulf consists of various masses from the North Atlantic.

== History ==
=== Pre-Columbian ===
The earliest known humans to arrive on the coast found an arid landscape. There was some larger game, but archaeologists have found that they hunted mostly rabbits, hare, and rodents to supplement a wide range of foraged plants. After climatic changes around 5,000 BC, a greater number of stable waterways, lakes, shoals, and lagoons increased the viability of fishing, agriculture, and permanent settlements. Local plants were domesticated inland and made their way to the coast along rivers. Barrier islands began to form along the coast by around 1,000 BC, and the sea level rose about a meter to near modern levels.

Native peoples around the Gulf were using dugout canoes hollowed and carved from the trunks of felled trees when the first Europeans wrote accounts of the area. Archaeologists have found dugout canoes dating back to 0 AD, and suspect that earlier examples likely existed.

In modern-day Florida, the eastern boundary of the Gulf, archaeologists have found human remains dating back to 10,000 BC. At the close of the Ice Age around 9,000 BC, the climate in Florida began a gradual shift from a dry prairie to wetlands. By 3,000 BC, Florida had reached its modern wetland climate. From the Florida Keys to the mangrove islets, the peoples of the Glades culture developed a complex society that relied heavily on fishing, harvesting wild shellfish, and gathering plants. The Deptford culture—stretching from Cedar Key north along the Florida panhandle—developed a distinct kind of fired pottery.

Along the Gulf's northern shore, people developed stable lifestyles and villages throughout the first millennium AD. Archaeological research on several pre-agricultural sites showed a reliance on farming and harvesting shellfish like the eastern oyster, likely timing their fishing to the annual cycles of high and low tides (when large quantities of oysters could be harvested in the mornings).

The prehistoric coasts of modern-day Texas and Northern Mexico were primarily inhabited by hunter-gatherers. Their remains show a heavy reliance on shellfish. Maize spread around the Gulf coast, likely as a trade good, as it was often adopted first by peoples who had already domesticated local plants.

On the Gulf's southern coast circa 1200–400 BC, the Olmec civilization flourished. Along the rivers flowing into the Bay of Campeche, they created complex cities at areas like San Lorenzo Tenochtitlán, relying heavily on fishing, turtles, and the resources of the floodplain, while also increasingly farming maize.

Off the coast of present-day Veracruz and the Yucatán Peninsula, the Maya civilization used the Gulf as a major trade route. They paddled in long dugout canoes, each carved from a single hardwood tree trunk, like Mahogany. Staying near the coast, Maya traders could navigate by onshore landmarks and lookout towers. Major ports included islands with natural harbors like Isla Cerritos north of the Yucatan, and Isla Mujeres where the Gulf meets the Caribbean Sea. Mayan ports traded a variety of goods, typically trading coastal goods (such as seafood, salt, cotton, cacao, spices, feathers, and jaguar pelts) for highland goods (such as obsidian, basalt, and jade).

Across the Yucatan Channel from modern-day Mexico, the only significant Gulf coast not connected to mainland North America is northwestern Cuba. As a result, it was inhabited millennia later than the other regions. The earliest known site of human habitation is Levisa, dated to 3100 BC. After 2000 BC, there are more sites across a broader range. Concentrated in western Cuba, the Guanahatabey culture and the Cayo Redondo culture centered around Guadiana Bay employed largely stone and shell tools.

=== Spanish exploration ===
The Spanish voyages of Christopher Columbus reached Cuba, but are not recorded entering the Gulf of Mexico. The map of Juan de la Cosa, who sailed with Columbus and later Amerigo Vespucci shows a speculative body of water beyond Cuba.

In 1506, Hernán Cortés participated in the conquest of Hispaniola and Cuba, receiving a large estate of land and enslaving Indigenous people for his efforts. In 1510, he accompanied Diego Velázquez de Cuéllar, an aide to the governor of Hispaniola, on his expedition to conquer Cuba. In 1518, Velázquez put him in command of an expedition to explore and secure the interior of Mexico for colonization.

In 1517, Francisco Hernández de Córdoba discovered the Yucatán Peninsula. This was the first European encounter with an advanced civilization in the Americas, with solidly built buildings and complex social structures which they found comparable to those of the Old World. They also had reason to expect that this new land would have gold. All of this encouraged two further expeditions, the first in 1518 under the command of Juan de Grijalva, and the second in 1519 under the command of Hernán Cortés, which led to the Spanish exploration, military invasion, and ultimately settlement and colonization known as the Conquest of Mexico. Hernández did not live to see the continuation of his work: he died in 1517, the year of his expedition, as the result of the injuries and the extreme thirst suffered during the voyage, and disappointed in the knowledge that Velázquez had given precedence to Grijalva as the captain of the next expedition to Yucatán.

In 1523, a treasure ship was wrecked en route at Padre Island, Texas. When word of the disaster reached Mexico City, the viceroy requested a rescue fleet and sent Ángel de Villafañe from Mexico City, marching overland to find the treasure-laden vessels. Villafañe traveled to Pánuco and hired a ship to transport him to the site, which that community had already visited. He arrived in time to greet García de Escalante Alvarado (a nephew of Pedro de Alvarado), commander of the salvage operation, when Alvarado arrived by sea on July 22, 1554. The team labored until September 12 to salvage the Padre Island treasure. This loss, combined with other ship disasters around the Gulf of Mexico, led to a plan for establishing a settlement on the northern Gulf Coast to protect shipping and rescue castaways more quickly. As a result, the expedition of Tristán de Luna y Arellano was sent and landed at Pensacola Bay on August 15, 1559.

On December 11, 1526, Charles V of the Holy Roman Empire granted Pánfilo de Narváez a license to establish colonial settlements along the present-day Gulf Coast of the United States, known as the Narváez expedition. The contract gave him one year to gather an army, leave Spain, be large enough to found at least two towns of 100 people each, and garrison two more fortresses anywhere along the coast. On April 7, 1528, they spotted land north of what is now Tampa Bay. They turned south and traveled for two days, looking for a great harbor the master pilot Miruelo knew of. Sometime during these two days, one of the five remaining ships was lost on the rugged coast, but nothing else is known.

In 1697, French sailor Pierre Le Moyne d'Iberville was chosen by the Minister of Marine to lead an expedition to rediscover the mouth of the Mississippi River and to settle Louisiana, which French explorer René-Robert Cavelier, Sieur de La Salle had named. The English coveted this region, however in 1682 it was named to honor King Louis XIV of France. D'Iberville's fleet sailed from Brest on October 24, 1698, reaching Santa Rosa Island near Pensacola; he sailed from there to Mobile Bay and explored Massacre Island. He anchored between Cat Island and Ship Island. On February 13, 1699, he went ashore at what is now Biloxi, with his teenage brother Jean-Baptiste Le Moyne de Bienville, and completed Fort Maurepas on the northeast side of the Bay of Biloxi on May 1. Three days later, d'Iberville sailed for France leaving his brother Jean-Baptiste as second in command.

The first permanent settlement, Fort Maurepas (now Ocean Springs, Mississippi), was founded in 1699 by d'Iberville. By then the French had also built a small fort at the mouth of the Mississippi at a settlement they named La Balize (or La Balize), "seamark" in French.

== Geography ==
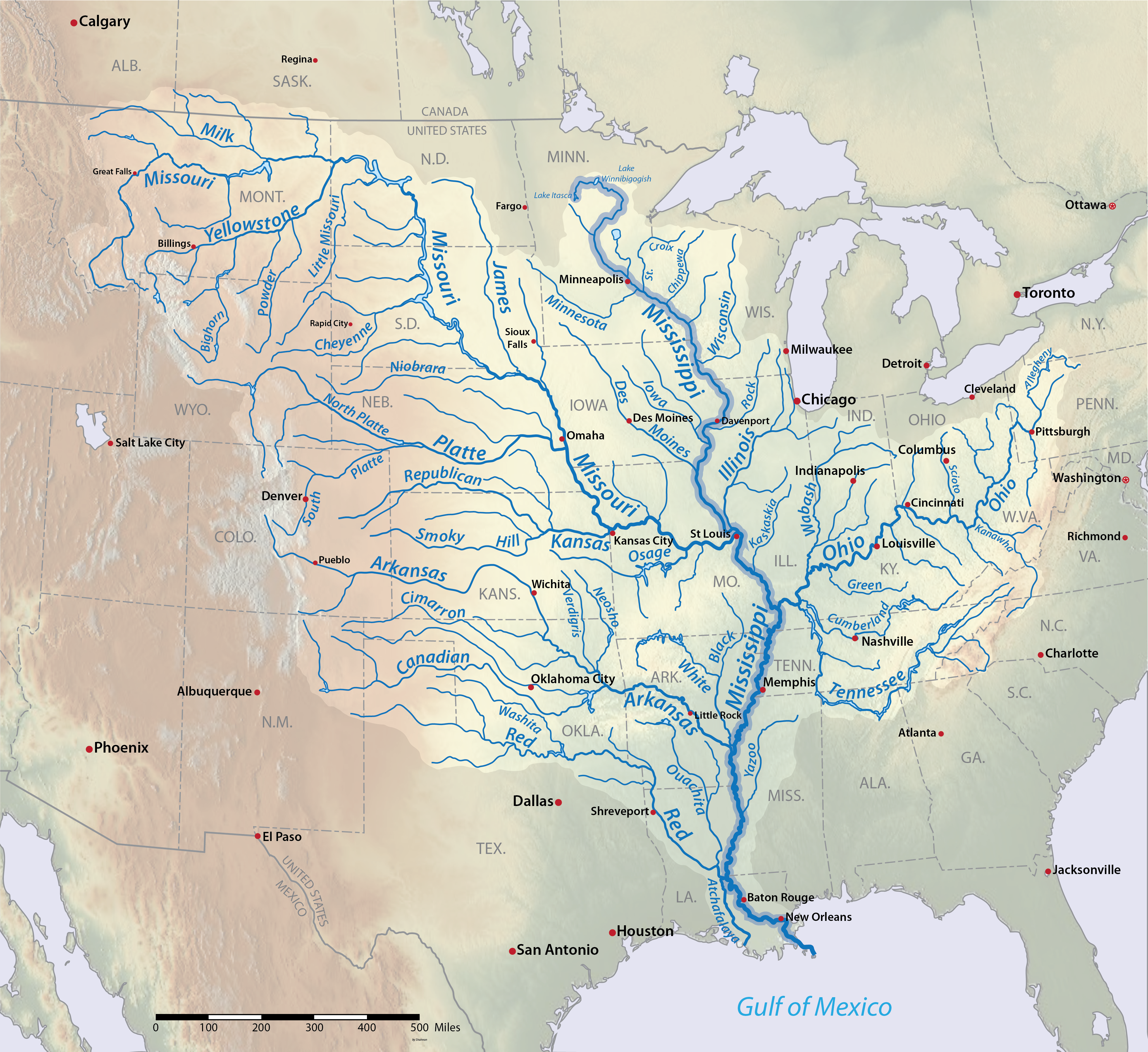
The Mississippi River watershed is the largest drainage basin of the Gulf of Mexico Watershed.

The Gulf of Mexico's eastern, northern, and northwestern shores lie along the U.S. states of Florida, Alabama, Mississippi, Louisiana, and Texas. The U.S. portion of the coastline spans 2,700 km (1,700 miles), receiving water from 33 major rivers that drain 31 states and 2 Canadian provinces, and consisting of the coastline from the southern tip of Florida and the Florida Keys to the U.S.–Mexican border between Brownsville, Texas, and Matamoros, Tamaulipas. The Mexican coastline spans 2,200 km (1,400 miles), consisting of the coastline from the U.S. border to the Cabo Catoche Light (near Cancún) at the northern tip of the Yucatán Peninsula. Cuba has about 100–400 km (60–250 miles) of official gulf coastline, along its northern land boundary. The southwestern and southern shores of the gulf lie along the Mexican states of Tamaulipas, Veracruz, Tabasco, Campeche, Yucatán, and the northernmost tip of Quintana Roo. On its southeast quadrant, the Gulf is bordered by Cuba. It supports major American, Mexican, and Cuban fishing industries. The outer margins of the wide continental shelves of Yucatán and Florida receive cooler, nutrient-enriched waters from the deep by a process known as upwelling, which stimulates plankton growth in the euphotic zone. This attracts fish, shrimp, and squid. River drainage and atmospheric fallout from industrial coastal cities also provide nutrients to the coastal zone.

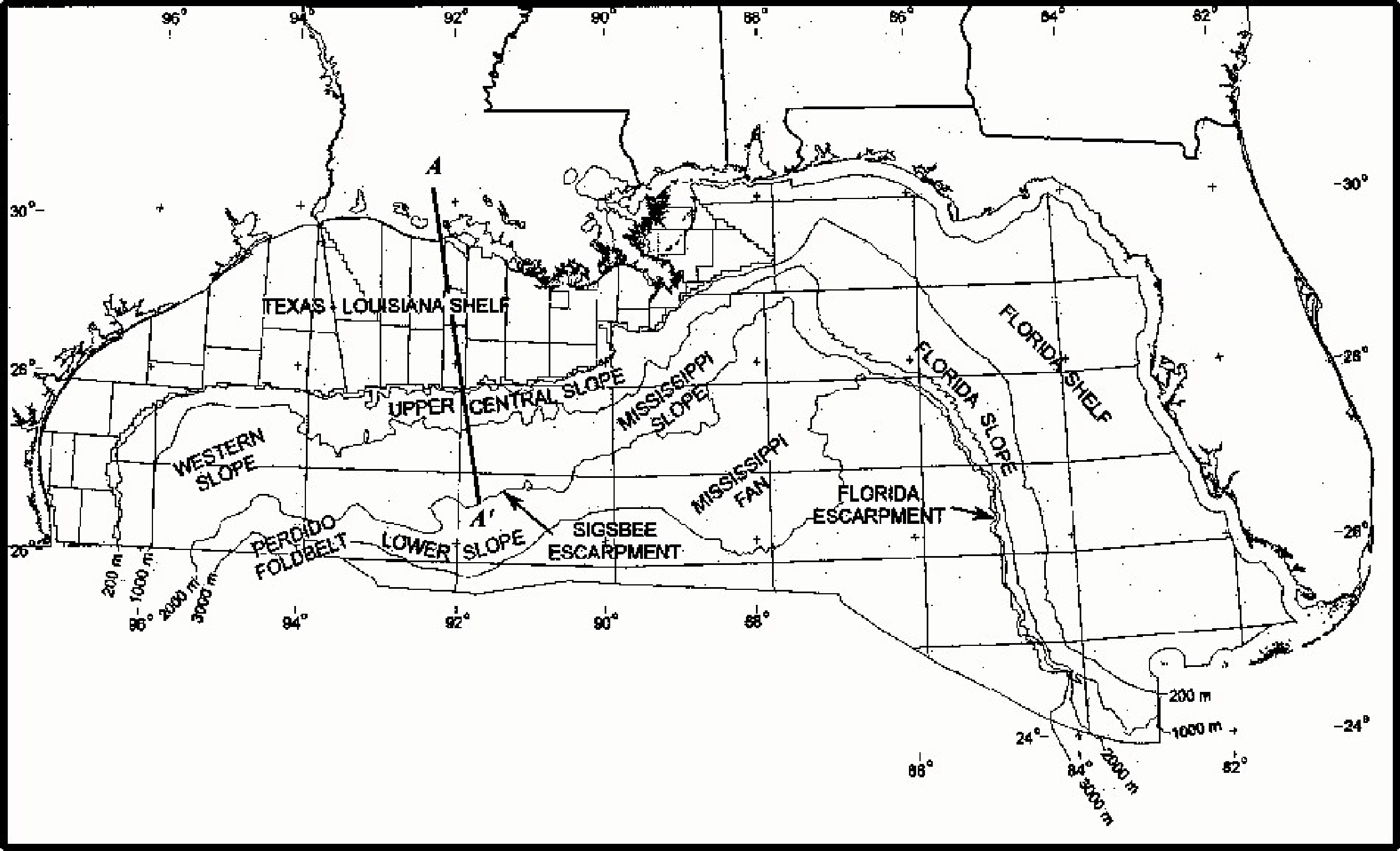
Map of northern part of Gulf of Mexico

The Gulf Stream, a warm Atlantic Ocean current and one of the strongest ocean currents known, originates in the gulf as a continuation of the Caribbean Current–Yucatán Current–Loop Current system. Other circulation features include a permanent cyclonic gyre in the Bay of Campeche and anticyclonic gyres, which are shed by the Loop Current and travel westwards, where they eventually dissipate. The Bay of Campeche constitutes a major arm of the Gulf of Mexico. Numerous bays and smaller inlets fringe the gulf's shoreline. Streams that empty into the gulf include the Mississippi River and the Rio Grande in the northern gulf and the Grijalva and Usumacinta rivers in the southern gulf. The land that forms the gulf's coast, including many long, narrow barrier islands, is almost uniformly low-lying and is defined by marshes, swamps, and stretches of sandy beach.

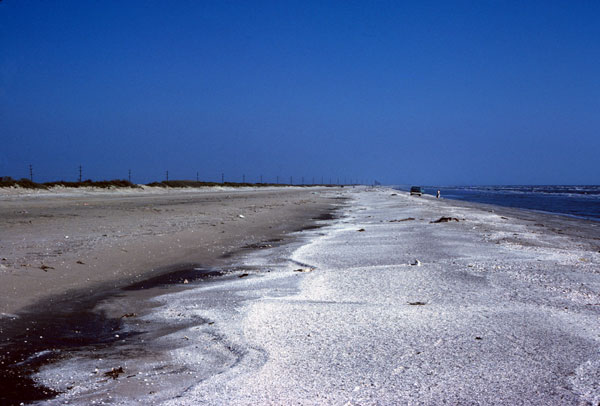
Gulf beach near Sabine Pass

The Gulf of Mexico is an excellent example of a passive margin. The continental shelf is quite wide at most points along the coast, notably at the Florida and Yucatán Peninsulas. The shelf is exploited for its oil through offshore drilling rigs, most of which are situated in the western gulf and the Bay of Campeche. Another important commercial activity is fishing; major catches include red snapper, amberjack, tilefish, swordfish, and various grouper, as well as shrimp and crabs. Oysters are also harvested on a large scale from many bays and sounds. Other important industries along the coast include shipping, petrochemical processing and storage, military use, paper manufacture, and tourism.

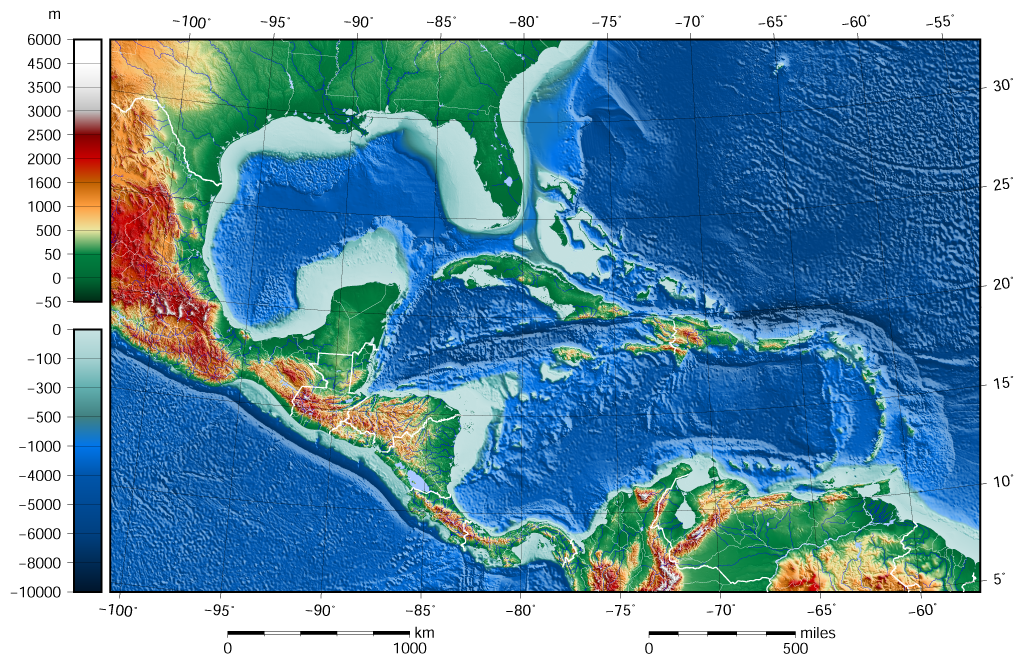
The shaded relief map of the Gulf of Mexico and the Caribbean area

The gulf is considered aseismic; however, mild tremors have been recorded throughout history (usually 5.0 or less on the Richter magnitude scale). Interactions between sediment loading on the sea floor and adjustment by the crust may cause earthquakes. On September 10, 2006, the U.S. Geological Survey National Earthquake Information Center reported that a magnitude 6.0 earthquake occurred about 400 km (250 miles) west-southwest of Anna Maria, Florida. The quake was reportedly felt from Louisiana to Florida. There were no reports of damage or injuries. Items were knocked from shelves and seiches were observed in swimming pools in parts of Florida. The earthquake was described by the USGS as an intraplate earthquake, the largest and most widely felt recorded in the past three decades in the region. According to The Tampa Tribune on the following day, earthquake tremors were last felt in Florida in 1952, recorded in Quincy, 32 km (20 miles) northwest of Tallahassee.

=== Maritime boundary delimitation agreements ===
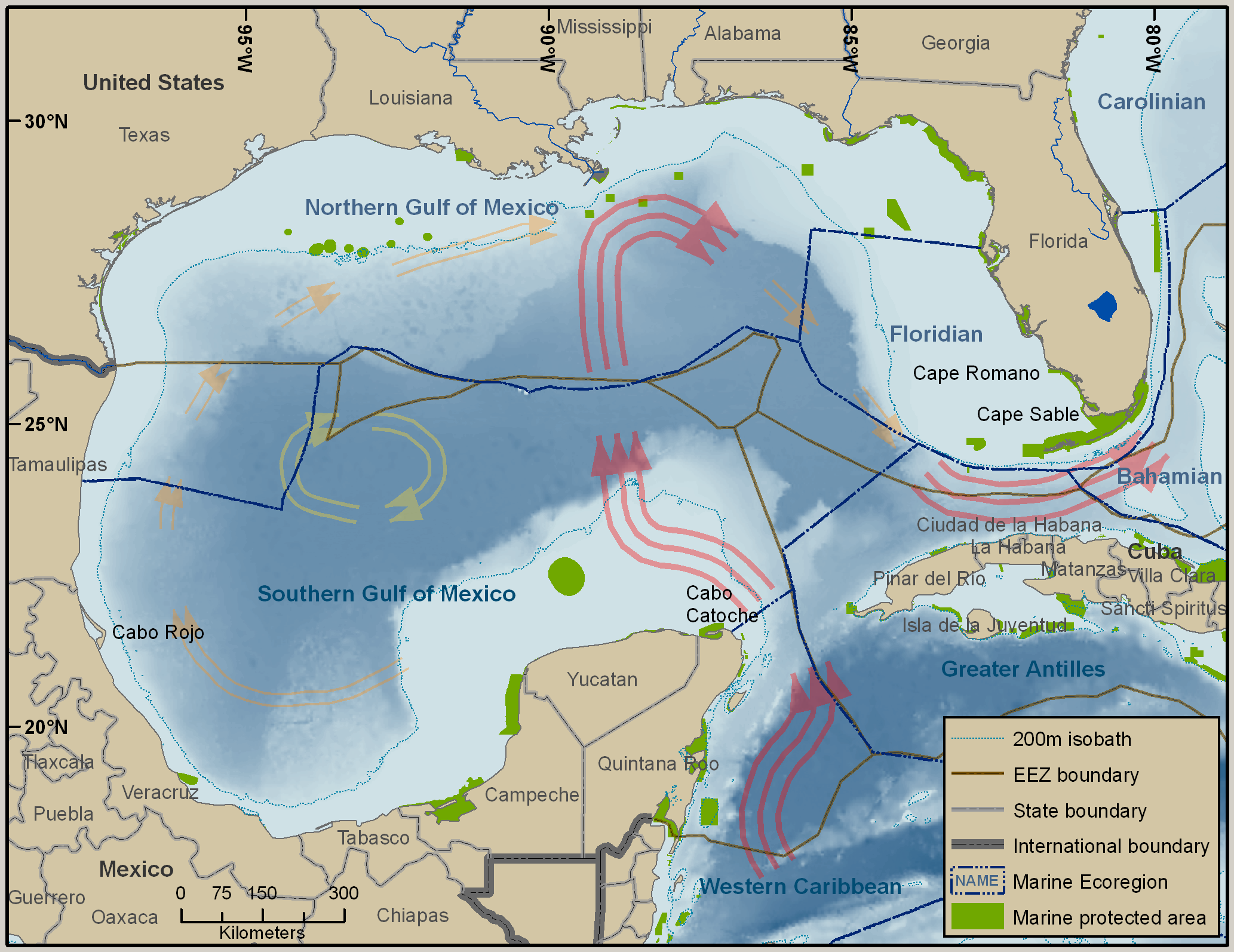
Map of the Gulf of Mexico and surrounding countries

Cuba and Mexico: Exchange of notes constituting an agreement on the delimitation of the exclusive economic zone of Mexico in the sector adjacent to Cuban maritime areas (with map), of July 1976.

Cuba and United States: Maritime boundary agreement between the United States of America and the Republic of Cuba, of December 1977.

Mexico and United States: Treaty to resolve pending boundary differences and maintain the Rio Grande and Colorado River as the international boundary, of November 1970; Treaty on maritime boundaries between the United States of America and the United Mexican States (Caribbean Sea and Pacific Ocean), of May 1978, and treaty on the delimitation of the continental shelf in the western Gulf of Mexico beyond 200 nautical miles (370 km; 230 mi), of June 2000.

In December 2007, Mexico submitted information to the Commission on the Limits of the Continental Shelf (CLCS) regarding the extension of Mexico's continental shelf beyond 200 nautical miles. Mexico sought an extension of its continental shelf in the Western Polygon based on international law, UNCLOS, and bilateral treaties with the United States, in accordance with Mexico's domestic legislation. In March 2009, the CLCS accepted Mexico's arguments for extending its continental shelf up to 350 nautical miles (650 km; 400 mi) into the Western Polygon. Since this would extend Mexico's continental shelf well into territory claimed by the United States, Mexico and the United States would need to enter a bilateral agreement based on international law that delimits their respective claims.

== Shipwrecks ==
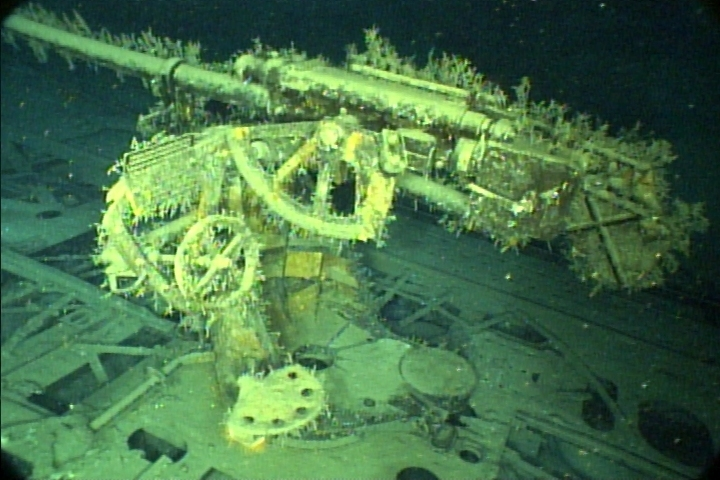
A deck gun of U-166

A ship now called Mardi Gras sank around the early 19th century about 56 km (35 mi) off the coast of Louisiana in 1,200 m (3,900 feet) of water. The ship, whose real identity remains a mystery, is believed to have been a privateer or trader. The shipwreck lay forgotten at the bottom of the sea until it was discovered in 2002 by an oilfield inspection crew working for the Okeanos Gas Gathering Company (OGGC). In 2007, an expedition led by Texas A&M University and funded by OGGC under an agreement with the Minerals Management Service (now BOEM) was launched to undertake the deepest scientific archaeological excavation to that date to study the site on the seafloor and recover artifacts for public display in the Louisiana State Museum. Videos and a documentary about the project, Mystery Mardi Gras Shipwreck, was made by Nautilus Productions with help from BOEM, Texas A&M University, the Florida Public Archaeology Network and Veolia Environmental about the project, short videos and video updates during the expedition. Video footage from the ROV was used in the documentary.

On July 30, 1942, SS Robert E. Lee, captained by William C. Heath, was torpedoed by German submarine U-166. The steamship was en route to New Orleans, sailing southeast of the entrance to the Mississippi River; she was being escorted by USS PC-566, captained by Lieutenant Commander Herbert G. Claudius. The explosion destroyed the No. 3 hold; vented through the B and C decks; and damaged the engines, the radio compartment, and the steering gear. PC-566 dropped depth charges on a sonar contact, sinking U-166. The badly damaged Robert E. Lee first listed to port, then to starboard, and finally sank within about 15 minutes of the attack. One officer, nine crew members, and 15 passengers were lost. The passengers aboard Robert E. Lee were primarily survivors of previous torpedo attacks by German U-boats. In 2001, the wrecks of U-166 and Robert E. Lee were found during the C & C Marine survey. The submarine was found in 1,500 meters (5,000 ft) of water, about three km (1.9 miles) from where it had attacked the liner.

== Biota ==
Various biota include chemosynthetic communities near cold seeps and nonchemosynthetic communities such as bacteria and other micro-benthos, meiofauna, macrofauna, and megafauna (larger organisms such as crabs, sea pens, crinoids, demersal fish, cetaceans, and the extinct Caribbean monk seal) are living in the Gulf of Mexico. Recently, resident Bryde's whales within the gulf were classified as an endemic, unique subspecies and making them as one of the most endangered whales in the world. The Gulf of Mexico yields more fish, shrimp, and shellfish annually than the south and mid-Atlantic, Chesapeake, and New England areas combined.

The Smithsonian Institution Gulf of Mexico holdings are expected to provide an important baseline of understanding for future scientific studies on the impact of the Deepwater Horizon oil spill. In Congressional testimony, Jonathan Coddington, associate director of Research and Collections at the Smithsonian's National Museum of Natural History, provides a detailed overview of the Gulf collections and their sources which Museum staff have made available on an online map. The samples were collected for years by the former Minerals Management Service (renamed the Bureau of Ocean Energy Management, Regulation and Enforcement) to help predict the potential impacts of future oil/gas explorations. Since 1979, the specimens have been deposited in the national collections of the National Museum of Natural History.

== Pollution ==
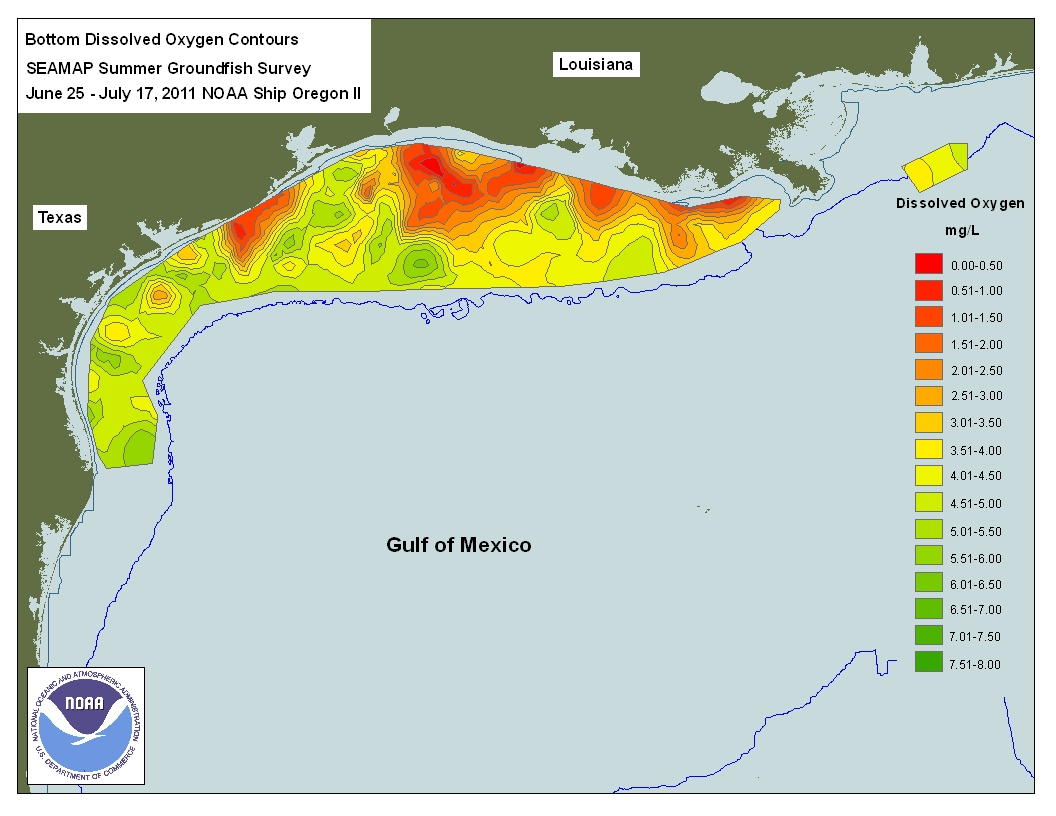
Dead zone in the gulf, along the northern coastline from Louisiana through Texas

The major environmental threats to the gulf are agricultural runoff and oil drilling. There are 27,000 abandoned oil and gas wells beneath the gulf. These have generally not been checked for potential environmental problems. In 1973, the United States Environmental Protection Agency prohibited the dumping of undiluted chemical waste by manufacturing sediment interests into the gulf, and the military confessed to similar behavior in waters off Horn Island. Microplastics within semi-enclosed seas like the gulf have been reported in high concentrations and the gulf's first such study, initiated in 2015, estimated concentrations that rival the highest globally reported.

There are frequent "red tide" algae blooms that kill fish and marine mammals and cause respiratory problems in humans and some domestic animals when the blooms reach close to shore. This has especially been plaguing the southwest and southern Florida coast, from the Florida Keys to north of Pasco County, Florida.

The gulf contains a hypoxic dead zone that runs east–west along the Texas–Louisiana coastline. In July 2008, researchers reported that between 1985 and 2008, the area roughly doubled in size. It was 22,730 km^{2} (8,780 square miles) in 2017, the largest ever recorded. Poor agricultural practices in the northern portion of the Gulf of Mexico have led to a tremendous increase of nitrogen and phosphorus in neighboring marine ecosystems, which has resulted in algae blooms and a lack of available oxygen. Occurrences of virilization and estrogen suppression were observed as a result. A 2007 study of the Atlantic croaker found a disproportioned sex ratio of 61% males to 39% females in hypoxic sites. This was compared with a 52% to 48% male-female ratio found in reference sites, showing impaired reproductive output for fish populations inhabiting hypoxic coastal zones.

=== Oil spills ===
According to the National Response Center, the oil industry has thousands of minor accidents annually in the Gulf of Mexico. The gulf's largest oil spill to date began in June 1979, when the Ixtoc I oil platform in the Bay of Campeche suffered a blowout and a catastrophic explosion, and lasted until the well was finally capped in April 1980.

Deepwater Horizon in flames after the explosion, April 20, 2010

On April 20, 2010, the Deepwater Horizon oil platform, located in the Mississippi Canyon about 64 km (40 miles) off the Louisiana coast and operated by the British multinational company BP, suffered a catastrophic explosion and later sank. (Note: The rig was storing 700,000 U.S. gallons (2,600,000 L) of diesel fuel.) Oil flowed from the wellhead, about 1.5 km (0.9 mi) below the surface on the ocean floor, creating a slick that covered hundreds of square kilometers of ocean surface, threatening marine life, adjacent coastal wetlands, and the livelihoods of Gulf Coast shrimpers and fishermen. Estimates of the daily flow jumped several times—on April 24, it was 160 cubic meters (1,000 bbl) by BP's estimate; on April 28, a NOAA scientist increased the estimate to 5,000 barrels (790 m^{3}); and on May 27, the USGS put the rate at 12,000–19,000 barrels per day (1,900–3,000 m^{3}/d). Final estimates suggested a leak of 62,000 barrels per day (9,900 m^{3}/d), a scale that had been suggested by both independent observers and federal scientists early on, but official attempts to release modeling data had been suppressed by the White House Office of Management and Budget, according to a report by the government commission investigating the response. On July 15, BP announced that the leak had stopped. In July, BP agreed to pay $18.7 billion to the U.S. government, the states of Alabama, Florida, Louisiana, Mississippi, and Texas, as well as 400 local authorities. As of 2015, BP had spent $54 billion on cleanup, penalties, and to repair environmental and economic damage.

On May 12, 2016, oil from subsea infrastructure on Shell's Brutus oil rig released 2,100 barrels of oil. This leak created a 5 to 34 km (3.1 to 21.1 mi) oil slick in the sea about 156 km (97 miles) south of Port Fourchon, Louisiana, according to the U.S. Bureau of Safety and Environmental Enforcement.

== Meteorological significance ==
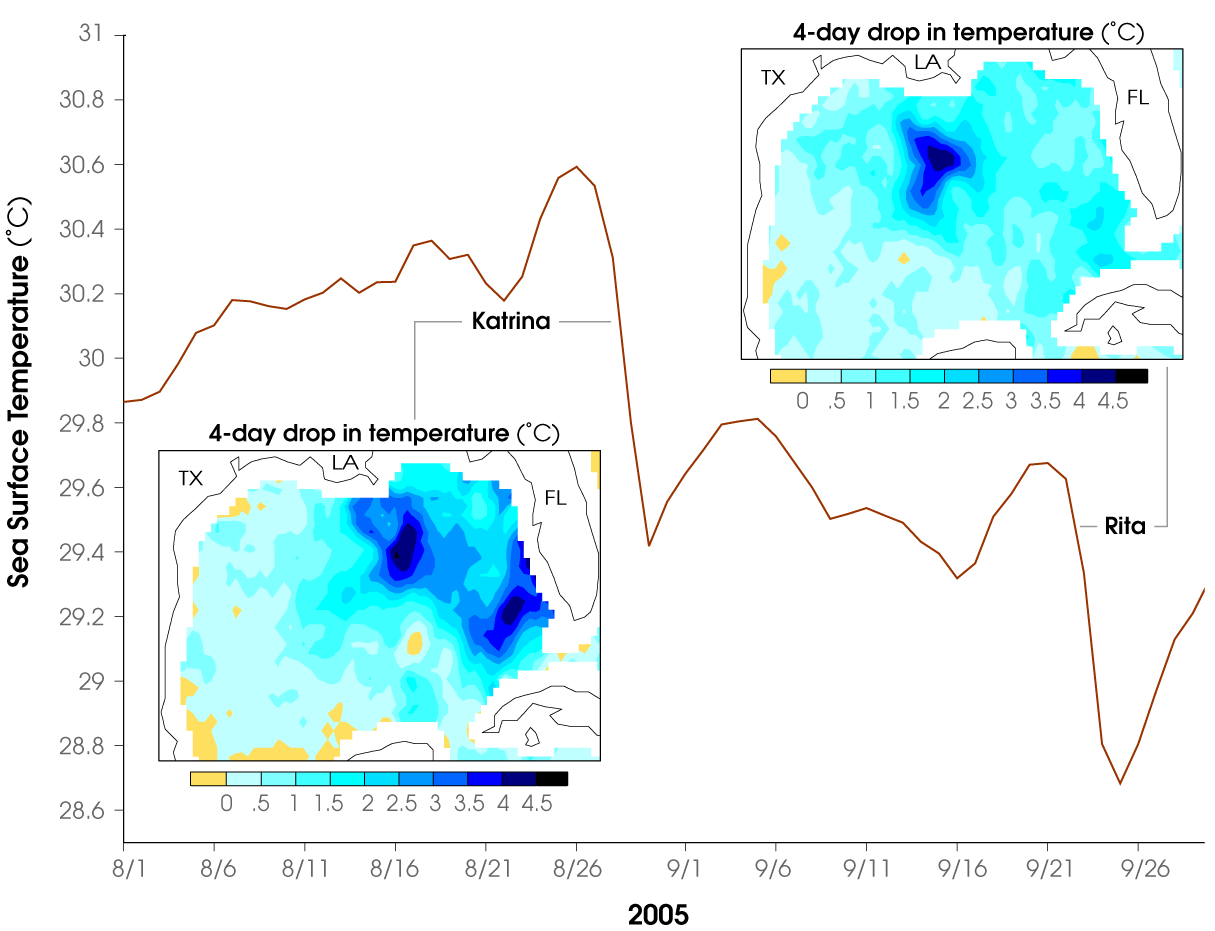
Graph showing the overall water temperature of the Gulf between Hurricanes Katrina and Rita. Although Katrina cooled waters in its path by up to 4 °C (7.2 °F), they had rebounded by the time of Rita's appearance.

The gulf's warm sea surface temperatures can feed powerful, deadly, and destructive Atlantic hurricanes such as Hurricane Katrina. The gulf's sea surface temperature, averaging around 28 °C (82 °F) during the summer, contributes to this development and intensification of hurricanes. In the open Atlantic, a hurricane will draw up cool water from the depths, making it less likely that further hurricanes will follow (warm water being one of the preconditions necessary for their formation). However, the gulf is shallower; when a hurricane passes over, the water temperature may drop, but it soon rebounds enough to support another tropical cyclone.

From 1970 to 2020, the gulf's sea surface temperatures increased approximately 1 °C (1.8 °F), or 0.19 °C (0.34 °F) per decade. This warming is about twice the rate observed for the global ocean surface.

Moisture from the Gulf of Mexico is a primary factor for the development of tornadoes and other severe weather in Tornado Alley, a term used to describe an area of the United States that is one of the most tornado-prone areas in the world. Dry air from the Rocky Mountains converges with Gulf moisture in the area, which produces storms and supercells that produce some of the most violent tornadoes in the world. A study published in the Journal of Climate by Dongmin Kim, Sang-Ki Lee, and Hosmay Lopez, found that the Madden–Julian oscillation strengthens the North American low-level jet, which increases the flow of Gulf moisture and atmospheric instability into the Central United States, furthering tornadogenesis in the region. The Gulf has one of the highest concentrations of lightning storms across any of the world's oceans due to interactions of cold fronts with the still warm Gulf waters in the winter and storms moving offshore the southern U.S. during the summer.

== See also ==
- Charlotte Harbor (estuary), an estuary in Florida
- Green Canyon, a Gulf of Mexico petroleum exploration area
- Gulf of Mexico Foundation, a U.S. non-profit
- Jack 2, a test well in the deep waters of the Gulf of Mexico
- Keathley Canyon, an undersea canyon in Gulf of Mexico
- Nepheloid layer, a layer of water in the deep sea basin, above the seabed
- Outer Continental Shelf, a maritime U.S. federal zone of jurisdiction
- Sigsbee Escarpment, a major bathymetric feature of the Gulf of Mexico
- Territorial evolution of the Caribbean, timeline of the territorial evolution of the Caribbean
- Tunica Mound, undersea mound in Gulf of Mexico
