= Sigsbee Escarpment =

Bathymetric feature

Main bathymetric features of the NW Gulf of Mexico

The Sigsbee Escarpment is a major bathymetric feature of the Gulf of Mexico, extending for about 560 kilometres (350 miles). It separates the lower continental slope of the northern gulf from the abyssal plain of the Sigsbee Deep and has up to 900 m (3,000 ft) of relief across it. It has formed as a result of salt tectonics, due to the effects of loading of a thick layer of Jurassic halite (Louann Salt) by Upper Jurassic to Cenozoic sedimentary rocks.

== See also ==
- List of escarpments
