= Sigsbee Deep =

Roughly triangular basin that is the deepest part of the Gulf of Mexico

The Sigsbee Deep (Note: The name "Sigsbee Deep" has sometimes been applied to Sigsbee Basin, a U. S. Board on Geographic Names approved name for a feature nominally at 42° 58' 00" N 069° 13' 00" W in the Gulf of Maine. See multiple features named for Sigsbee at National Geospatial Intelligence Agency's Undersea Features History.) (Mexico basin in the U. S. Board on Geographic Names Advisory Committee on Undersea Features Gazetteer) is a roughly triangular basin that is the deepest part of the Gulf of Mexico named for Charles Dwight Sigsbee. There is some confusion of names that apply to the basin or a particular point in the basin, with both being found in technical and popular literature applying to both basin and the coordinates.

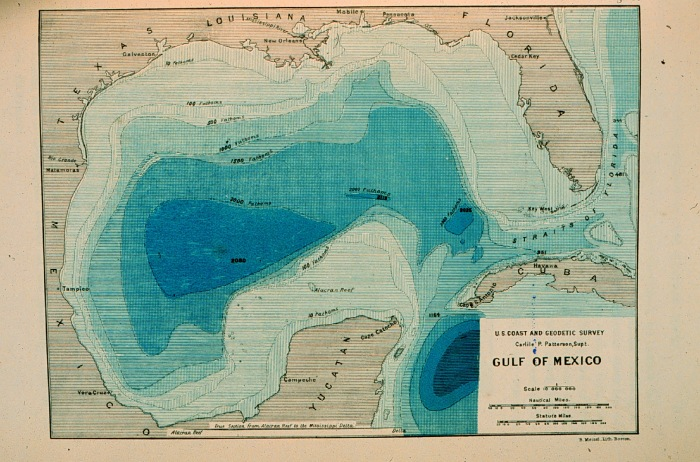
Contour map of Gulf of Mexico as sounded by the C&GS Steamer Blake between 1873 and 1875. Over 3,000 soundings went into this chart, most of the deep water soundings taken by the Sigsbee Sounding Machine. This was the first realistic bathymetric map of any oceanic basin. In: "Three Cruises of the BLAKE" by Alexander Agassiz, 1888. P. 102.

== Description ==
The basin is located in the southwestern quadrant of the gulf, with its closest point to the U.S. coast at 200 miles (320 km) southeast of Brownsville, Texas. The actual maximum depth is disputed, and estimates range between 3,750 and 4,384 metres (12,303 and 14,383 ft). The average depth of the gulf is roughly 1,615 metres (5,299 ft). The Sigsbee Abyssal Plain is the deepest and flattest sector of the deep basin.

=== Name/Location differences ===
The use of "Sigsbee" for the feature originates from Commander Charles Dwight Sigsbee's Gulf of Mexico surveys that defined the general features of the body while he was commanding officer of the USC&GS George S. Blake. "Sigsbee Deep" applied to the entire deep basin appears on some of the earliest charts of the Gulf of Mexico.

Sigsbee Deep is a variant name for the United States Board on Geographic Names (BGN) approved name of Mexico Basin for cartographic materials produced by federal agencies. A proposal by the United States renaming Sigsbee Deep, with coordinates of 23° 52′ N 91° 35′ W, to "Mexico Basin" was rejected by the Sixteenth Meeting of the GEBCO Subcommittee on Undersea Feature Names, the international authority on feature names, in 2003 with the note that it is "an historical name dating back to Sir John Murray." The committee discussion of the United States nomination Mexico Basin as having the coordinates 23° 52′ N 91° 35′ W as the Sigsbee Deep under consideration noted the Mexico Basin is in the GEBCO Gazetteer with coordinates of 22° 30′ N 95° 00′ W to 25° 00′ N 90° 00′ W. (Note: The cited reference discusses differences in United States and IHO committee views and variations between names recommended by the Advisory Committee on Undersea Features (ACUF) of the U. S. BGN and the GEBCO committee.) The issue appears to be one of the entire basin or a particular point within the basin for application of the names. The United States' proposal to rename the 23° 52′ N 91° 35′ W point "Mexico basin was rejected while the ACUF Mexico basin with "Sigsbee deep" as an alternate name is given in the NGA database as 25° N 92° W.

There are other features with BGN approved names in the region in recognition of Sigsbee:

- Sigsbee Plain - 23° 30′ 00″ N 093° 00′ 00″ W
- Sigsbee Knolls - 23° 45′ 00″ N 092° 25′ 00″ W
- Sigsbee Escarpment - 26° 00′ 00″ N 092° 30′ 00″ W
