= Loop Current =

Ocean current between Cuba and Yucatán Peninsula

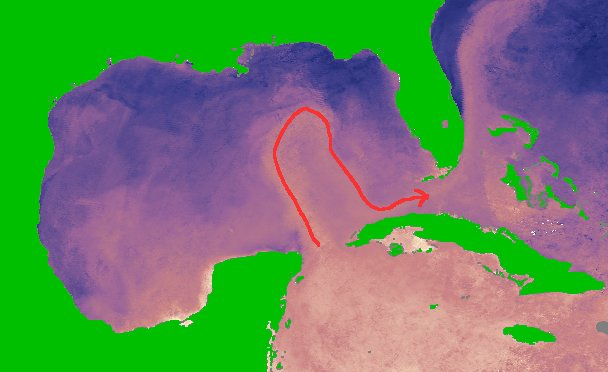
A map of the Loop Current

A parent to the Florida Current, the Loop Current is a warm ocean current that flows northward between Cuba and the Yucatán Peninsula, moves north into the Gulf of Mexico, loops east and south before exiting to the east through the Florida Straits and joining the Gulf Stream. The Loop Current is an extension of the western boundary current of the North Atlantic subtropical gyre. Serving as the dominant circulation feature in the Eastern Gulf of Mexico, the Loop Currents transports between 23 and 27 sverdrups and reaches maximum flow speeds of from 1.5 to 1.8 meters/second.

A related feature is an area of warm water with an "eddy" or "Loop Current ring" that separates from the Loop Current, somewhat randomly every 3 to 17 months. Swirling at 1.8 to 2 meters/second, these rings drift to the west at speeds of 2 to 5 kilometers/day and have a lifespan of up to a year before they bump into the coast of Texas or Mexico. These eddies are composed of warm Caribbean waters and possess physical properties that isolate the masses from surrounding Gulf Common Waters. The rings can measure 200 to 400 kilometers in diameter and extend down to a depth of 1000 meters.

== Effect on tropical cyclones ==
Around 1970, it was believed that the Loop Current exhibited an annual cycle in which the Loop feature extended farther to the north during the summer. Further study over the past few decades, however, has shown that the extension to the north (and the shedding of eddies) does not have a significant annual cycle, but does vacillate in the north-south and east-west directions on an inter-annual basis.

The Loop Current and its eddies may be detected by measuring sea surface level. Sea surface level of both the eddies and the Loop on September 21, 2005 was up to 60 cm (24 in) higher than surrounding water, indicating a deep area of warm water beneath them. On that day, Hurricane Rita passed over the Loop current and intensified into a Category 5 storm with the help of the warm water.

In the Gulf of Mexico, the deepest areas of warm water are associated with the Loop Current. The rings of current that have separated from the Loop Current are commonly called Loop Current eddies. The warm waters of the Loop Current and its associated eddies provide more energy to hurricanes and allow them to intensify.

As hurricanes pass over warm areas of the Gulf of Mexico, they convert the ocean's heat into storm energy. As this energy is removed from the seas, a wake of colder water can be detected along the hurricane's path. This is because heat is withdrawn from the ocean mixed layer in a number of ways. For instance, sensible and latent heat are lost directly to the tropical cyclone across the air-sea interface. Also, the horizontal divergence of wind-driven mixed layer currents results in the upwelling of colder thermocline water. Finally, the turbulent entrainment of colder thermocline waters caused by wind stirring also results in the cooling of the surface waters. These are the reasons that the depth of the ocean mixed layer is more important in hurricane deepening than sea surface temperature. A thin veneer of warm surface waters will be more susceptible to hurricane induced cooling than waters with a larger mixed layer and deeper thermocline. Furthermore, models suggest that cyclones are more likely to reach a larger fraction of their maximum potential intensity over warm oceanic features where the 26 °C isotherm extends beyond 100 meters.

An example of how deep warm water, including the Loop Current, can allow a hurricane to strengthen, if other conditions are also favorable, is Hurricane Camille, which made landfall on the Mississippi Gulf Coast in August 1969. Camille formed in the deep warm waters of the Caribbean, which enabled it to rapidly intensify into a category 3 hurricane in one day. It rounded the western tip of Cuba, and its path took it directly over the Loop Current, all the way north towards the coast, during which time the rapid intensification continued. Camille became a Category 5 hurricane, with an intensity rarely seen, and extremely high winds that were maintained until landfall (190 mph (310 km/h) sustained winds were estimated to have occurred in a very small area to the right of the eye).

In 1980, Hurricane Allen strengthened to a Category 5 hurricane while moving over the Loop Current, but it weakened before its landfall in Texas.

Hurricane Ivan rode the Loop Current twice in 2004.

In 2005, Hurricane Katrina and Hurricane Rita both greatly increased in strength when they passed over the warmer waters of the Loop Current. Hurricane Wilma of 2005 was expected to make its Florida landfall as a Category 2 hurricane, but after encountering the southeastern portion of the Loop Current, it reached the Florida coast as a category 3 instead.

While not as infamous as Katrina, Hurricane Opal most definitively illustrates the deepening abilities of a warm core ring. After crossing the Yucatán Peninsula, Opal reentered the Gulf of Mexico and passed over an eddy shed by the Loop Current. Within a fourteen-hour period, sea surface pressure dropped from 965 to 916 hectopascals, surface winds increased from 35 to 60 meters/second, and the storm condensed from a radius of 40 kilometers to 25 kilometers. Prior to the storm, the 20 °C isotherm was located at a depth between 175 and 200 meters, but was found 50 meters shallower after the storm had passed. While the majority of this hurricane induced cooling of the mixed layer was attributed to upwelling (due to Ekman divergence), another 2000 to 3000 watts/meter squared were estimated to be lost through heat flux at the air-water interface of the storm's core. Furthermore, buoy-derived sea surface temperature readings recorded temperature dropping 2° to 3 °C as Opal passed over Gulf Common Waters, but only 0.5° to 1 °C as the storm encountered the more massive ocean mixed layer associated with the warm core eddy.

In 2008, Hurricane Gustav transited the Loop Current, but due to the current's temperature (then only in the high 80's-degrees-F) and truncated size (extending only halfway from Cuba to Louisiana, with cooler water in-between its tip and the Louisiana coast) the storm remained a category 3 hurricane instead of increasing strength as it passed over the current.

In August 2021, Hurricane Ida moved over the Loop Current, allowing it to rapidly intensify from a Category 2 into a Category 4 hurricane over just one night.

=== Process ===
Hurricane strengthening and weakening is the product of extensive thermodynamic interactions between the atmosphere and the ocean. Generally speaking, the evolution of a hurricane's intensity is determined by three factors. First, the initial intensity of a tropical cyclone is a predominant factor and its strength will be reflected throughout the storm's life. Second, the thermodynamic state of the atmosphere through which the cyclone moves will affect its ability to strengthen, as strong horizontal winds will disperse internal circulation and prevent the vertical stacking of energy within the storm. The third component affecting hurricane intensity is the heat exchange between the upper layer of ocean waters and the core of the storm. For this reason, a major focus of hurricane research has been sea surface temperature prior to a storm. However, recent studies have revealed that surface temperature is less important in hurricane deepening than the depth of the ocean mixed layer. In fact, a hurricane's sea level pressure has been shown to be more closely correlated with the 26 °C isotherm depth (and oceanic heat content) than the sea surface temperature. Storms passing over the Loop Current or warm core eddies have access to more tepid water, and therefore the higher energy content of the heated molecules.

Once Hurricane Rita left the Loop Current and passed over cooler water, it declined in strength, but the main factor in this weakening was an eyewall replacement cycle (ERC) occurring at that time. The ERC and other atmospheric factors are why Rita did not reintensify when subsequently passing over the eddy vortex.

Also of note: tropical depressions, tropical storms, and hurricanes gain strength from, but are not steered by, the temperature of the water. They are steered by the atmosphere, and the atmospheric level involved in steering a hurricane is different at different intensities (i.e., it relates to the minimum pressure of the hurricane).

==== Sea level and sea temperature ====
Sea level is relatively easy to measure accurately using radars from satellites. Sea temperature below the surface is not as easy to measure widely, but can be inferred from the sea level since warmer water expands and thus (all other factors, such as water depth, being equal) a vertical column of water will rise slightly higher when warmed. Thus sea level is often used as a proxy for deep sea temperatures.

NOAA's National Data Buoy Center maintains a large number of data buoys in the Gulf of Mexico, some of which measure sea temperature one meter below the surface.

== Biology ==
The Loop Current and Loop Current Eddies affect biological communities within the Gulf of Mexico. In general, however, it is not the warm-core Loop Current and eddies themselves that affect these communities. Instead, it is the smaller cold-core features known as Frontal Eddies that form around the boundary of the Loop Current and Loop Current Eddies, which affect biological communities in the Gulf.

Loop Current Frontal Eddies are cold-core, counter-clockwise rotating (cyclonic) eddies that form on or near the boundary of the Loop Current. LCFEs range from about 80 km to 120 km in diameter. These cold features are smaller than the warm-core eddies shed from the Loop Current.

Multiple studies have shown differences in biological communities inside versus outside of the various features in the Gulf of Mexico. Higher standing stocks of zooplankton and micronekton were found in cold-core features than in both the Loop Current and the Loop Current Eddies. However, no difference in the abundance of euphausiids, planktonic shrimp-like marine crustaceans, was found between areas of upwelling and warm-core eddies, but in 2004 the hyperiid abundance was found to be lower within Loop Current Eddies as opposed to outside. Concurrently, it was found that nutrient (nitrate) levels were low above 100 meters within warm-core eddies, while nitrate levels were high within cold features. Low standing stock of chlorophyll, primary production, and zooplankton biomass was found to be low in LCEs.

Low chlorophyll concentrations and primary production are likely a result of low nutrients levels, as many planktonic species require nitrate and other nutrients to survive. In turn, low primary production could be one cause of heterotrophic (organism-eating, as opposed to photosynthetic) species abundances being low inside the Loop Current and Loop Current Eddies. Alternatively, temperature may play a role for low abundances of both communities: Atlantic Blue Fin Tuna have developed behavioral patterns of avoiding the high temperatures associated with warm-core features, such as the Loop Current and Loop Current Eddies, in the Gulf of Mexico. It is possible, also, that planktonic species likewise avoid the higher temperatures in these features.

== See also ==
- National Oceanographic Data Center
