= Trade in Maya civilization =

Transfer of ownership of goods and services

Map of Maya and Aztec land trade routes (in red)

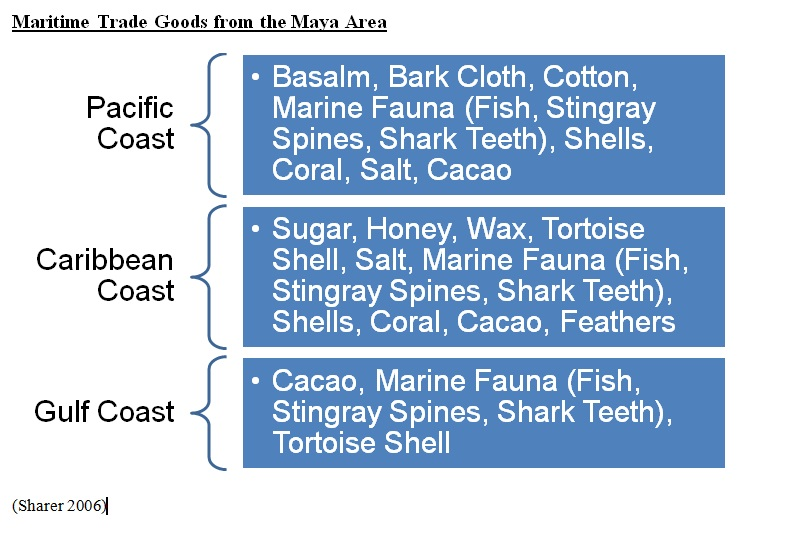
Ancient Maya Maritime Trade Resources

Trade was a crucial factor in maintaining Maya cities.

Activity consisted mainly of foods like fish, squash, yams, corn, honey, beans, turkey, vegetables, salt, chocolate drinks; raw materials such as limestone, marble, jade, wood, copper, and gold; and manufactured goods such as paper, books, furniture, jewelry, clothing, carvings, toys, weapons, and luxury goods. The Maya also had an important services sector, through which mathematicians, farming consultants, artisans, architects, astronomers, scribes and artists would work. Some of the richer merchants also sold weapons, gold and other valuables. Specialized craftsmen created luxury items and devices to overcome specific problems, usually by royal decree.

There was also long range trade in many necessities such as salt, potatoes, stone and luxury items when these were not plentiful locally. Goods varied greatly regionally, with districts of kingdoms typically specializing in a specific trade.

== Structure ==
The Maya relied on a strong middle class of skilled and semi-skilled workers and artisans which produced both commodities and specialized goods. Governing this middle class was a smaller class of specially educated merchant governors who would direct regional economies based upon simple supply and demand analysis, and place mass orders for other regions. Above the merchants were highly skilled specialists such as artists, mathematicians, architects, advisers, and astronomers. The specialist class would sell their services and create luxury goods based upon their specific skill set. At the top of the structure was a ruler, or rulers, and an array of advisers who would manage trade with other kingdoms, ensure that regions remained stable, inject capital into specific sectors and authorize construction of large public works.

For decades, Maya exchange systems and overall economic systems have been viewed as overly simplistic and adhering to ideas of preindustrial political economies put forth by Polanyi. In the mid-20th century, political economy was examined with an emphasis on identifying the evolution of political organization rather than understanding the economic systems that set the foundation for how they function. Polanyi put forth three modes of exchange for the Maya: reciprocity, redistribution, and market exchange, which limited Maya societies to chiefdom levels of societal complexity. In Polanyi's model of Maya economy there existed highly centralized control of exchange by the elite members of society who maintained their status and a system of civic-ceremonial infrastructure through taxation of tribute goods followed by redistribution down the social ladder to secure loyalty and fealty from others.

Polanyi's legacy and the subsequent substantivist versus formalist debate have reduced interest in the discussion of preindustrial market economies and have created a market/no market dichotomy in political economy literature. However, as more research has been conducted on Maya trade and exchange systems there have been multiple models put forth that recognize higher levels of complexity, various degrees of participation, and fluctuating economic scales related to political organization and collapse. The delineation of trade routes, and acceptance of marketplaces and market exchange economies, has increased due in large part to the archaeological research surrounding Maya obsidian procurement, distribution, production, and exchange.

It is now believed that Classic Maya cities were highly integrated and urbanized, featuring marketplaces and market economies to exchange many goods including obsidian. A market exchange mechanism has been noted at Classic period Calakmul murals that depict a range of specialists near an area that appears to be a market. Linguistic evidence shows that there are words in the Yucatec Maya language for “market” and “where one buys and sells”. The Classic Maya region is highly integrated into the overall trade network but it appears that several routes connected the East and West due to the variety of large, urbanized Maya centers as well as marketplace distribution economies. At Late Classic Coba, marketplaces were determined to have existed in two large plazas that featured multiple causeway entrances, linear/parallel market stall architecture, and geochemical signatures of high Phosphorus levels in arranged patterns which indicate the presence of traded organic goods. In the Puuc region, more central Mexican obsidian entered and while it does appear to be limited to elites only it does appear to be a highly commercialized and valued exchange good linked to Chichen Itzá and market distribution.

== Currency ==
The Maya used several different mediums of exchange and in the trading of food commodities, the barter system was typically used for large orders. Cacao beans were used for everyday exchange in Postclassic times. For more expensive purchases gold, jade and copper were used as a means of exchange. However, these mediums of exchange are not "money" in the modern sense, in different sites and cities, these mediums of exchange were valued differently.

== Development ==
Because of the readily available trade resources and local merchants in most of the Maya territory, small towns did not need to take part in long-distance trading and limited trade to local exchange. Despite the fact that the area was rich in resources, even the most self-sufficient farm families, which were the vast majority of the population, still had to participate in exchanges in order to obtain the necessities (the necessities would generally include some pottery, bronze or copper tools, salt, and imported fish for inland areas). As craftsmen in small cities began to specialize and the cities began to grow, so did the need for increased trade. Cities such as Tikal and El Mirador are two such examples. Tikal, specifically, had a population somewhere in the range of 60,000–120,000 people, which means it would have needed to get food and other goods from up to 100 km away. Because of the size of these, they would have also needed a larger amount of control from the Rulers to oversee it. Eventually the increased trade, and growing cities gave the Rulers more power over their territory and their subjects.

However, not only the central cities in the empire grew. Because of the increased amount of traffic through the smaller cities along trade routes, these once isolated cities grew too, creating a fairly consistent amount of growth throughout the Post-Classic period.

Evidence discovered in the past few decades seems to prove that trade was widespread among the Maya. Artifacts collected under grants from the National Science Foundation, the National Geographic Society, and Howard University, show that hard stones and many other goods were moved great distances (despite the inefficiency of moving goods without so-called 'beasts of burden'). Modern chemical tests have taken these artifacts and confirmed that they originated in locations great distances away. There is also documented trade of goods ranging from honey to quetzal feathers throughout the Maya region.

The goods, which were moved and traded around the empire at long distance, include: salt, cotton mantels, slaves, quetzal feathers, flint, chert, obsidian, jade, colored shells, Honey, cacao, copper tools, and ornaments. Due to the lack of wheeled cars and use of animals, these goods traveled Maya area by the sea.

Because the Maya were so skilled at producing and distributing a wide variety of goods, they built a lifestyle based on trade throughout all of Mesoamerica, which spread to many different groups of people. It is suggested that because the Maya were so skilled as traders, they may have spared themselves from the wrath of the expanding Aztec empire. The Aztecs valued the Maya for their ability to produce and trade a variety of different commodities, and because of this, the Aztecs did not feel the need to conquer the Maya. Trade facilitated the blending of diverse cultural elements, leading to the emergence of new cultural identities. For example, the exchange between the Maya and Teotihuacan civilizations in Mesoamerica resulted in the fusion of architectural styles, religious practices, and artistic motifs.

== Commodities ==
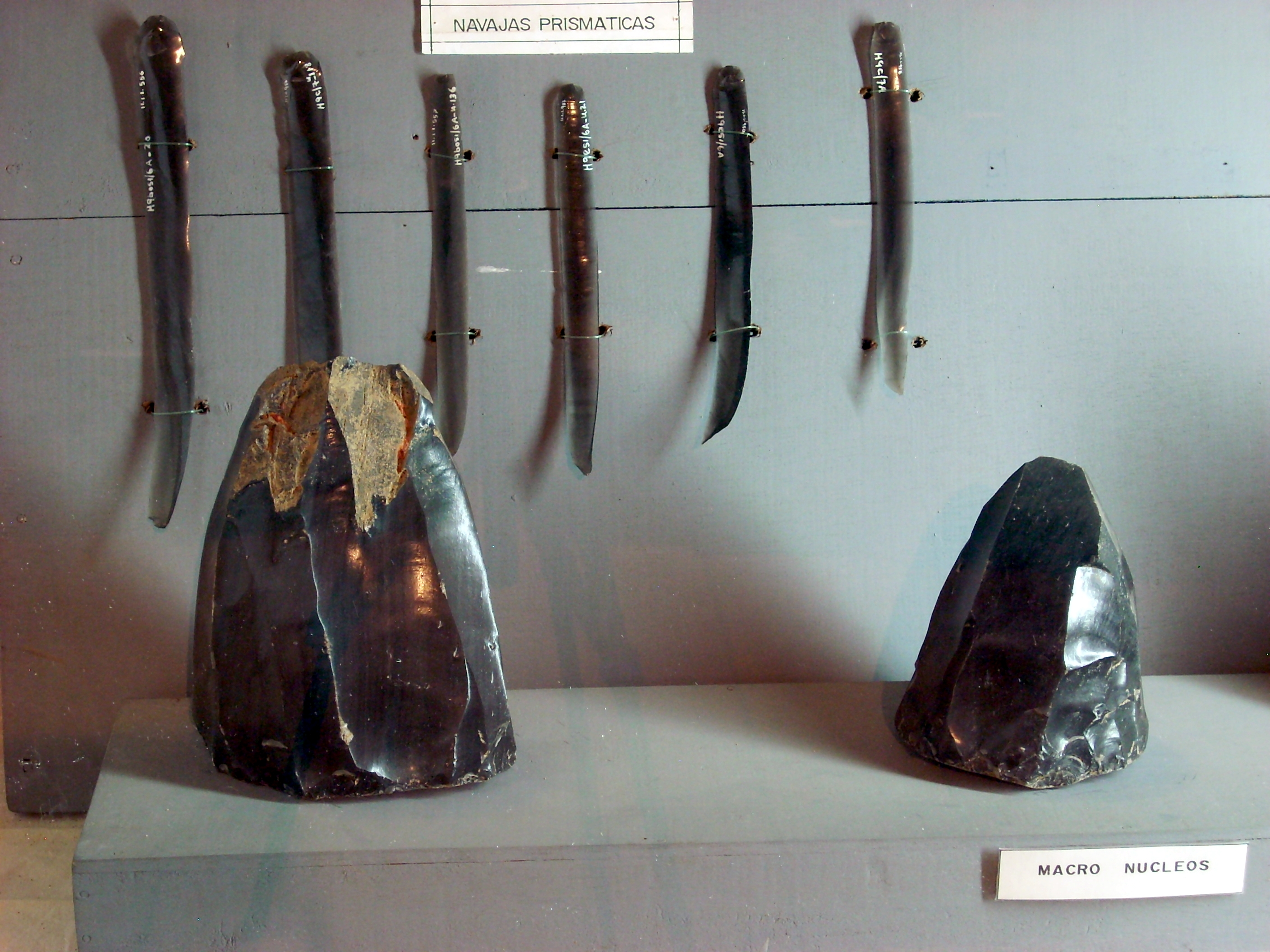
Raw obsidian and obsidian blades, examples of Maya commodities,

As trade grew in the Postclassic period, so did the demand for commodities. Many of these were produced in large specialized factory-like workshops around the empire, and then transported elsewhere mostly by sea due to poor roads and heavy cargo. Some of these commodities included, fine ceramics, stone tools, paper, jade, pyrite, quetzal feathers, cocoa beans, obsidian, copper, bronze and salt.

Mostly the main population used the more basic commodities, such as stone tools, salt, cacao beans, fish and manufactured goods such as books and ceramics and wood items. But some of the other commodities like gold, jade, copper, obsidian and other raw materials were goods that upper class and rulers used to show off their power.

=== Salt ===
Arguably the most important of these commodities was salt. Salt was not only an important part of the Maya diet, but it also was critical in the preservation of food. By covering meat and other food items in salt the Maya were able to dehydrate it so that it would not rot. Salt, for the most part, was produced near the oceans by drying out large flats of seawater. After the flats were dry, the salt could be collected and moved throughout the empire. The greatest producer of salt in all of Mesoamerica was Yucatán, in which the peoples specialized in salt collection and at one point monopolized the entire salt industry. Although there were several other salt wells further inland, the Yucatán people were able to monopolize the salt industry because sea salt was the most valuable and highly demanded kind of salt throughout the Mayan empire.

It is estimated that the Early Classic Tikal's population of roughly 45,000 consumed approximately 131.4 tons of salt annually. Not only is it required in diet, but it can also be used as a preservative. Salt was also frequently used for ritual and medicinal purposes. It is also believed that salt was commonly used during childbirth and death. A midwife would offer salt to both parents at birth and a saline solution was sprinkled throughout the house following the death of a family member. Veterans of battle often wore armor, consisting of short cotton jackets packed with rock salt—the equivalent of the modern "flack jacket" and tight bindings of leather or cloth on forearms and legs.

Three major sources of Salt have been identified for the Petén Lowlands Maya sites, the Pacific Lowlands, the Caribbean coast and the Salinas de los Nueve Cerros in the Chixoy river in the Highlands of Alta Verapaz in Guatemala, where the salt is obtained from a brine springs that flows from a Salt dome, curiously its color is black, this site produced an estimated 2,000 tons per year. Other inland sources such as San Mateo Ixtatán in Huehuetenango and Sacapulas in Quiché also have been documented and are still in use. The Salt was obtained in disposable tin unfired brine-cooking vessels, such as the ones still used in Sacapulas and San Mateo Ixtatán, Guatemala, that not only evaporated the water, but made blocks of salt, the vessel was thus, a single use. In The Pacific Lowlands, platforms were used to obtain sun-dry salt, near La Blanca such platforms have been documented ca 1000 BC, and are perhaps the oldest in Mesoamerica.

Both methods were used in the production of salt, as has been proved in Nueve Cerros by Andrews and Dillon. The salt was then transported using the river routes, such as the Chixoy, that forms the Usumacinta when it merges with the Pasión river near Altar de Sacrificios.

=== Ceramics and Furniture ===
Ceramics and furniture were produced in specialized workshops, before being traded for other goods. Often the work produced by a particular artist, or workhouse was heavily sought after by the elite classes of Maya society and therefore artists were usually supported by and primarily catered to the wealthy. Art goods such as jade carvings, paintings, ornate furniture and metal ornaments were also circulated through kingdoms, and local areas amongst the elite classes. This was usually the case because of the strong symbol of power and wealth the fine arts provided. The ceramics produced were mainly plates, vases, and cylindrical drinking vessels. When painted, these pots were usually painted red, with gold and black detailing.

=== Jade and Obsidian ===
Rare stones such as jade and pyrite were also very important to the Maya elite. These stones were relatively hard to acquire, so having such treasures helped them to solidify their positions in the society. Many of the stones were collected in the highlands of the empire in Guatemala, so when long-distance trade developed, the Maya were able to move more of these precious stones to the lowland cities.

The Jade route was mainly the Motagua river and a recently discovered land route in the Sierra de las Minas, and then distributed to all the Maya area and beyond, using canoes in the Caribbean routes, as well as the Pasión River route via the land route through Alta Verapaz. A unique and valuable trade item tends to become more valuable as it is traded farther from the source. The incentive is to profit by continuing to trade it until one of three things happens: an owner can't bear to part with it, it reaches a cultural area where it is not valued, or it reaches the bitter end of the trade route.

For the jadeite axes found on the island of Antigua, the second and third may have both applied. Antigua was the far eastern edge of the Taino cultural area and of the Caribbean island chain. This finding is significant geologically and archaeologically as it argues for the primacy of Guatemala as the New World source of jadeite jade and refutes an assertion that all exotic gems and minerals in the Eastern Caribbean were sourced from South America, as no jadeite rock is known from there. (See Jade). The Caribbean route is also the most likely Olmec trade route for Jade.

The fact that Cancuén appears to have prospered for hundreds of years without warfare and that commerce appeared to play a far more important role in everyday life than religion contradicts the widespread view among scholars that religion and warfare were the sources of power for Maya rulers, particularly toward the end of their dominance, after about 600 A.D.

This is true also for the Obsidian, transported from the El Chayal (25 km (16 mi) north from Kaminaljuyú), San Martín Jilotepeque and from the Ixtepeque quarries, using a river that converges with the Motagua River, then it was transported from the Caribbean shores, using the Río Azul, Holmul River (Guatemala), and the Mopan River systems, to distribute it to the major centers in Petén.

In El Baúl Cotzumalguapa, in the Pacific Lowlands, large workshops have been documented, the production of artifacts was aimed at manufacturing two major products: prismatic blades and projectile points. Both technological types required specialized skills and a centralized productive organization. The major purpose of this production was serving the local and probably the regional demand of cutting tools, throwing weapons with a cutting point, and instruments for scraping, polishing and perforating, all of which could be a part of household maintenance activities. Economic restructuring during the transition from the Classic to the Postclassic periods, as well as the beginning of trade over water, allowed for larger volumes of long-distance trade to occur, and therefore the commodities were able to reach throughout the entire Maya region.

== See also ==
- Geography of Mesoamerica
- Maritime trade in the Maya civilization
- Obsidian use in Mesoamerica
- Regional communications in ancient Mesoamerica

== Bibliography ==
- Coe, Michael D., "The Maya", Eighth Edition, Thames & Hudson, 2011
