= Tunica Mound =

Undersea mound in Gulf of Mexico

Coordinates: 27°40′N 92°15′W

Tunica Mound is an undersea mound located in the Gulf of Mexico. It is approximately 240 miles southeast of Houston and 200 miles southwest of New Orleans.
