= Global Mayors' Forum =

Global Mayors' Forum 全球市長論壇
- Abbreviation: GMF
- Formation: 2005
- Type: International NGO
- Headquarters: Hong Kong
- Region served: Worldwide
- Council Chairman: Dr. Carl Men Ky Ching
- Main organ: GMF Council
- Website: English http://www.globalmayorsforum.org Chinese http://www.globalmayorsforum.org/gmf2011/

Global Mayors' Forum
- Traditional Chinese: 全球市長論壇
- Simplified Chinese: 全球市长论坛
Transcriptions
Standard Mandarin
- Hanyu Pinyin: Quánqiú shì cháng lùntán

The Global Mayors' Forum (GMF) is a three-day international conference held annually by the GMF Council on the topic of urban development. The forum focuses on issues related to sustainable development but also covers other issues including international cooperation, modern development practices, public relations, hosting large scale activities and other topics in the fields of urban planning, economics and international relations. The Global Mayors’ Forum is divided into several conference sessions, forum sessions and meetings. These various sessions have different focuses but are all related to the theme of the GMF for that year. For each conference a new host city is selected by the GMF Council.

== History ==
Planning for the first Global Mayors’ Forum began in 2005 after many months of consideration. The goal of the Global Mayors’ Forum was to transcend national and institutional barriers by bring together participants from the public and private sectors. Additionally participants would be recruited from around the globe in order to bring together participants from disparate geographic areas. The GMF council met for the first time in 2008 to discuss and plan the GMF 2009. The inaugural GMF was to be held in Hong Kong in 2009 but this conference was called off due to the H1N1 epidemic. In 2010 Zhuhai's was named as the host city for the 2011 and 2012 GMF conferences.

== Global Mayors' Forum 2011 ==
The theme for the GMF 2011 is “Road to Rio +20” in reference to the 2012 United Nations Conference on Sustainable Development. Like the Rio +20 conference, the GMF 2011 will be focused on sustainable development and the development of a green economy. The GMF 2011 will be held in Zhuhai, China. This city was selected by the five organizing institutions to host the 2011 GMF for its unique history and sustainable development practices. Zhuhai was one of the first Chinese cities to be designated a Special Economic Zone in 1979. As a result of embracing the challenges of modernization, Zhuhai has grown from a small village to a major economic and transportation hub. Zhuhai will host all sessions of the Global Mayors’ Forum 2011, including the China Sustainable Development Forum and the Six-Party Forum.

=== China Sustainable Development Forum ===
The GMF 2011 will begin with the China Sustainable Development Forum which is to be hosted by the Chinese Society for Sustainable Development (CSSD). The topic of this forum is sustainable development in the People’s Republic of China. One of the keynote speeches will be given by Madam Deng Nan, former vice minister of the State Science and Technology Commission and daughter of former Chinese leader Deng Xiaoping.

=== Six-Party Forum ===
The feature form of the GMF 2011 is the Six-Party Forum. The six parties refer to participants and attendees from six different fields, namely:

- government officials
- non-governmental officials
- business leaders/entrepreneurs
- scholars/academics
- student representatives
- the global press.

The six party forums is co-hosted by the International Mayor Communication Centre and the Chinese Society for Sustainable Development. Due to CSSD’s consultative status with the UN Economic and Social Council (ECOSOC), the results of this forum will be reported to ECOSOC for consideration during the Rio +20 Conference in Rio de Janeiro.

== Global Mayors' Forum 2012 ==
As part of Zhuhai's winning bid they also received the right to host the 2012 Global Mayors forum. This forum does not yet have an official theme or date. The Global Mayors' Forum 2012 will feature the Mayors' Forum.

=== Mayors’ Forum ===
The Mayors’ Forum was set up for all the mayors and governors attending the GMF 2011. The theme for this forum has not yet been decided. Mayors from all over the world will be given a platform to exchange ideas, policies and practices that they have invested in or are interested in.

=== Others ===
Other activities for attendees include a Roundtable Meeting to match mayors and governors with business leaders who can offer solutions the sustainable development challenges encountered by governments. Additionally, the GMF 2011 will feature City Promotion and Project Presentation sessions for city officials, investors and corporations.

== Principle Stakeholders ==
=== Organizers ===
- World Business Council for Sustainable Development (WBCSD)
- CITYNET
- CITYSCAPE
- Local Governments for Sustainability (ICLEI)
- International Mayor Communication Centre

=== Endorsing Organizations ===
- United Nations Environmental Programme (UNEP)
- United Nations Human Settlements Programme (UN-HABITAT)
- United Nations Development Programme (UNDP)
- Chinese People's Association for Friendship with Foreign Countries (CPPAFC)
- The China International Friendship Cities Association (CIFCA)
