= Maritime trade in the Maya civilization =

About maritime trade

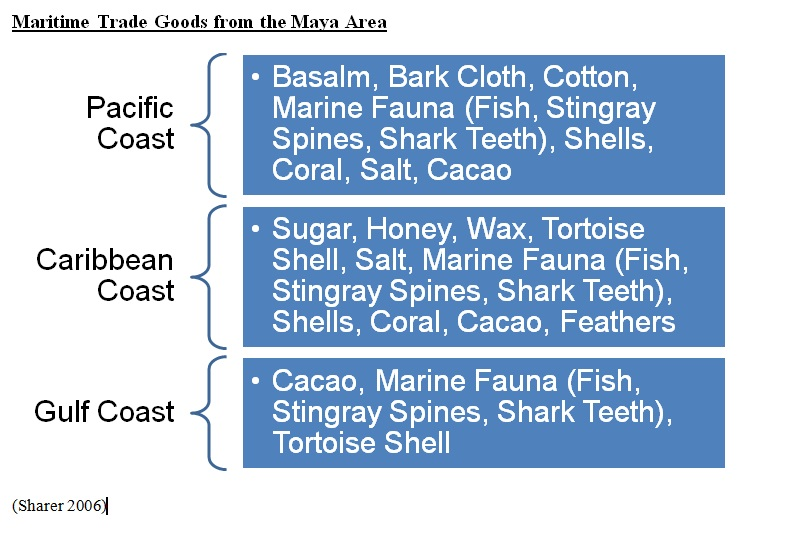
Maritime trade goods of the Maya

The extensive trade networks of the Ancient Maya contributed largely to the success of their civilization spanning three millennia. Maya royal control and the wide distribution of foreign and domestic commodities for both population sustenance and social affluence are hallmarks of the Maya visible throughout much of the iconography found in the archaeological record. In particular, moderately long-distance trade of foreign commodities from the Caribbean and Gulf Coasts provided the larger inland Maya cities with the resources they needed to sustain settled population levels in the several thousands. Though the ruling class essentially controlled the trade economy, a middle merchant class supervised import and export from cities and trade ports. Not much is known of the Maya merchant class; however, merchants of royal lineage are sometimes represented in the iconography. Notably, a canoe paddle often accompanies the royal merchant depictions, signifying their association with marine resources.

Water lilies are also a recognizable feature of Maya iconography, appearing on ceramics and murals in landlocked cities like Palenque where the lilies cannot grow, further indicating the important political symbolism of water connections. The dugout style canoes of the Maya and other small watercraft are also represented in various codices, sometimes ferrying royal figures or deities. The rich tradition of maritime trade has continued into the modern era, exemplified by the resource exploitation of the coastal lagoons and cay locations along the Caribbean coast of Mexico, Belize, Guatemala, and Honduras. Eventually, the intensification of maritime trade reliance aided in the collapse of interior Maya power regimes, shifting political influence to coastal polities such as Uxmal and Chichen Itza in the Terminal Classic. A seaborne trade economy would continue to dominate the Maya civilization until the period of European contact.

== Common coastal trade commodities ==
One of the largest trade industries from the coast involved the establishment of salt mining. Salt is a basic dietary requirement and is difficult to obtain in the interior landscape of Central America. In response to this need, salt workshops cropped up along coastal Maya regions practicing the sal cocida technique of boiling brine in ceramics pots. These salt workshops, such as those found at Ambergis Caye, Placencia Lagoon, and Punta Ycacos Lagoon in Belize, provided salt for dietary consumption as well as the salt packing of other subsistence resources, such as fish, for coastal-inland trade.

Salt trade was a commodity of both common and elite social groups, though the quality of the salt likely fell under regulation between the classes, with elite grade "white" salt imported from the coasts of the Yucatán peninsula. Basic household commodities, such as subsistence items (maize, beans, fish, shellfish, sugar, honey, etc.), stone tools, manos and metates, textiles, and simple ceramic wares produced throughout the Maya sphere would also have made their way to the major port trade sites for regional distribution.

== Elite coastal trade commodities ==
The trade of elite goods exemplifies Maya complex economic phenomena. The control of elite Maya commodities trade from inland to coastal regions was pivotal in creating and reinforcing political rule. Accessibility to obsidian, seashells, stingray spines, master crafted ceramics, jadeite, cacao, textiles, quetzal feathers, and gold were limited to the top of the Maya social strata. Presence of these commodities at sites both inland and coastal suggests connections to elite persons and to larger regional city centers, whether through trade or occupational usage. Not all coastal sites were necessarily occupied primarily as settlements, instead acting as de facto ports of trade because of their strategic locations at river mouths. The major trade site of Moho Cay in southern Belize is one such specific port, where high quality chert and obsidian from interior obsidian outcrops in the Guatemalan highlands was amassed for distribution down the Belize River to large cities, like Tikal, during the Classic Period.

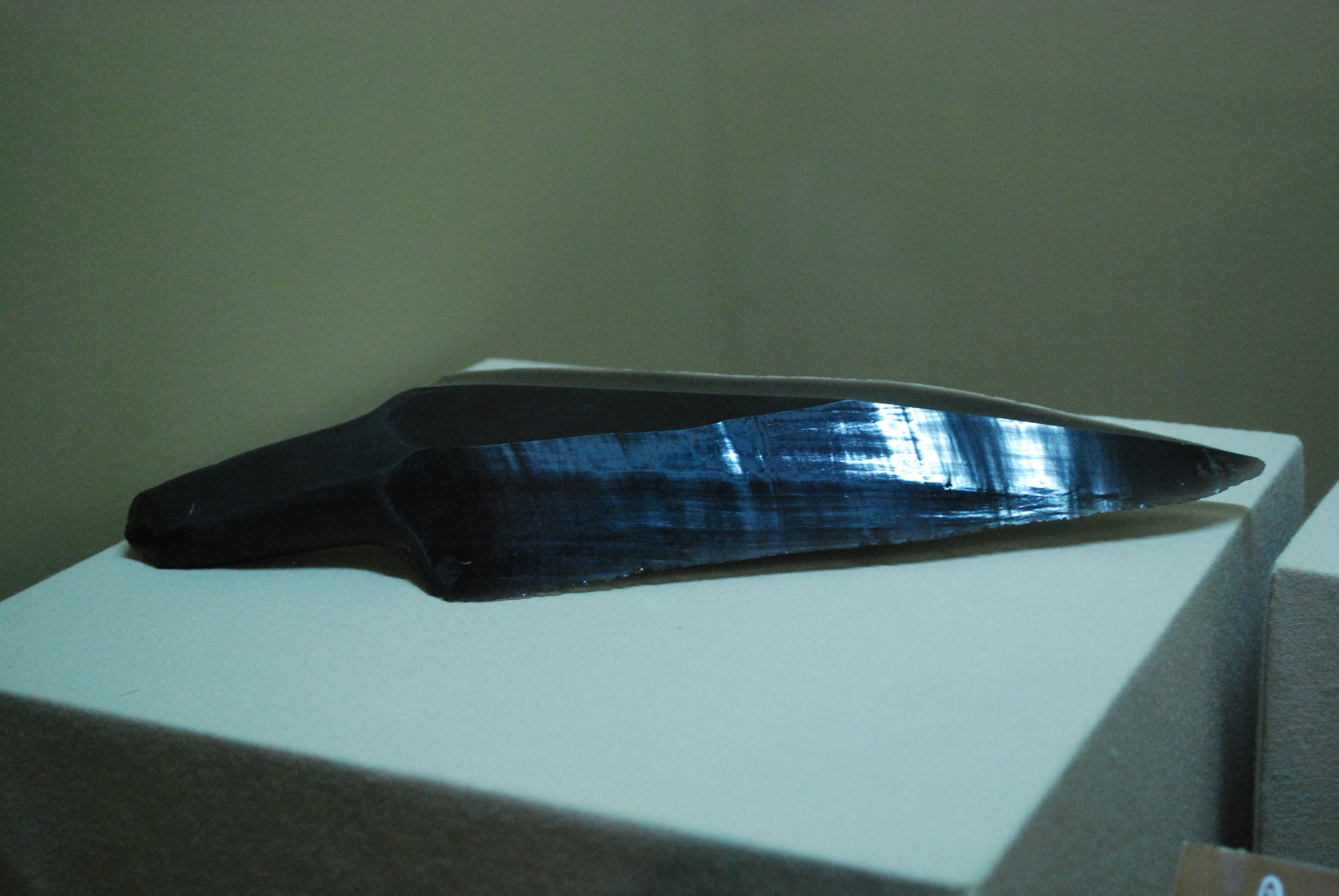
Obsidian blade example

Wild Cane Cay on the northern Belizean coast also operated as a trade port focused on foreign obsidian distribution. Seashells, particularly conch and thorny oyster (Spondylus spp.), were prized for both ritual usage and elite adornment. Modern strontium isotope analysis provides a means for sourcing shells trade to interior Maya settlements. Likewise, stingray spines imported from the coast played a major role in royal Maya bloodletting rituals for communing with ancestors and deities.

There is evidence that gold and jade, either as a raw material or a manufactured product, was produced in only limited quantities in the Maya regional sphere. Many instances of these two rare elite goods traveled by long-distance trade from the Isthmo-Columbian Area outside of the Maya cultural sphere. The goldworks and jade originated in Costa Rica and Ecuador and likely traded up through coastal Caribbean routes, as interior routes were largely impassable. Likewise, artifacts of Maya origin appear in the archaeological record throughout the Isthmo-Colombian Area.

== Maya ports ==
There are a large number of port sites known and identified across the Maya world. Ports fall into four primary categories; transshipment ports, autonomous ports, ports controlled by an inland polity, and departure ports.

=== Cerros ===
Cerros (18.35444N 88.35406W) is located in Chetumal Bay, in the mouth of the New River. It is the oldest known Maya port site, dating to the Early Classic. Cerros is a complex settlement with monumental buildings and a large residential area, it also has a stone jetty and artificial canals. Cerros was at its height in the Late Classic and spent the Classic period as primarily a religious and residential site rather than a trading port. This changed in the Postclassic when Cerros became a key port again until its abandonment around 400 CE.

=== Chac Balam ===
Chac Balam (18.18218N 87.87073W) is located on the north leeward side of Ambergris Caye, Belize and has an artificial harbour over 100 m wide. The site is arranged around a plaza with the structures on marl platforms faced with cut limestone. Artefacts indicative of long-distance trade found at Chac Balam include obsidian, basalt, slate, jade and pottery. Several burials have been excavated at the site including one of a male buried with jade artefacts and ritual bloodletting paraphernalia suggesting the individual was an elite, possibly even the ruler of Chac Balam.

=== Chac Mool ===
Chac Mool (21.1669N 86.8033W) is located in Cancún on the Caribbean coast of Yucatán. It has been identified as involved in transhipment and salt production and has artefacts associated with Chichen Itzá. The site was occupied from the Terminal Classic through to the Postclassic.

=== El Meco ===
El Meco (21.21083N 86.80416W) is located on the eastern side of the top of Yucatán, opposite Isla Mujeres. The site was occupied throughout the Classic and Postclassic, becoming prominent as a port with links to Chichen Itza and Mayapan and as the possible control point of access to Isla Mujeres.

=== Isla Cerritos ===
Isla Cerritos (21.5635N 88.2845W) is located on the north coast of Yucatán in the Gulf of Mexico and a few miles east of the Lagartos river estuary. The island has been identified as a major port for the inland polity of Chichen Itzá although it continued to function beyond the decline of Chichen Itzá for around 200 years. The site has extensive evidence of docking facilities on the north, east and west sides while the southern side has a seawall of 300 m which is located 80 m offshore and has three entrances, one of which is identified as the primary entrance and was possibly flanked by towers. Isla Cerritos was occupied from the Late Preclassic to the Early Postclassic.

=== Isla de Piedras ===
Isla de Piedras (20.34333 N 90.49805W) is located on the midpoint of the Yucatán peninsula's Gulf Coast close to Jaina. The island has identifiable port features and a major occupation period in the Classic, with the Late Classic as its height. The island is identified as an autonomous port, although there has been a suggestion that it may have formed a coastal polity with Jaina.

=== Ixpaatun ===
North side of Chetumal Bay. Built on bluffs, defended on land side by walls around core area.

=== Jaina ===
Jaina (20.20876N 90.48628W) is located on the midpoint of the Yucatán peninsula's Gulf Coast close to Isla de Piedras. The island is partially artificial having been extended by the Maya. The island is identified as an autonomous port, although there has been a suggestion that it may have formed a coastal polity with Isla de Piedras.

=== Laguna Francos ===
Laguna Francos (18.024429N 87.935732W) is located about halfway down the leeward side of Ambergris Caye, Belize. The site is large for the island with primarily Late Classic deposits and boasts a natural harbour and the formal arrangement of mounds which supported pole and thatch buildings. There are small plazas located between these mounds. Many artefacts consistent with the conduction of long-distance trade have been found at the site, including exotic pottery, obsidian, basalt and greenstone.

=== Marco Gonzalez ===
Marco Gonzalez (17.88166N 88.01218W) is located on the southern leeward side of Ambergris Caye, Belize, and is probably the largest site on the island covering an area of 355 by 155 m and including at least 53 buildings with several other structures including plazas and platforms. It was excavated between 1984 and 1994 by Dr Elizabeth Graham and Dr David Pendergast. The site has been identified as a major port for the inland city of Lamanai and is unique as it is the sole location on the Caye that did not experience decline following the Terminal Classic, instead undergoing expansion in the Postclassic; this follows the pattern of Lamanai which was one of the few inland Lowland Maya sites to escape the so-called 'Maya Collapse' in the 9th century. Marco Gonzalez was definitely occupied until the 13th century and possibly even until the 15th century. Artefacts uncovered at Marco Gonzalez include green Pachuca and grey Highland Guatemalan obsidian, exotic pottery and greenstone.

=== Moho Cay ===
Moho Cay (16.49997N 88.16725W) is located in southern Belize in the mouth of the Belize River. The site was a transshipment port and has two key periods of occupation; the first between 400 and 700 CE and the second between 900 and 1100 CE, although this was significantly smaller. Only the north side of the island was occupied, the rest consisting of mangrove swamp. The site was destroyed in 1980 during dredging for a modern marina.

=== San Gervasio ===
San Gervasio (20.50035N 86.84829W) is located on the island of Cozumel, which lies off the Caribbean coast of Yucatán. The island contains many structures which are believed to have aided navigation and the site has stone causeways linking the sea to the settlement. It has been suggested that merchants from Cozumel founded Mayapán following the collapse of Chichen Itzá. San Gervasio has been identified as being particularly linked to the cotton and honey trades in addition to the trade of obsidian, pottery and greenstone. Cozumel was one of the first Maya locations conquered by the Spanish, and most of its indigenous population was wiped out in a few years by violence and disease.

=== San Juan ===
San Juan (18.15266N 87.89313W) is located on the northern leeward side of Ambergris Caye, Belize, and was the first place a canoe would encounter after passing through the Bacalar Chico canal. The site is fairly small and has no large plaza, but it is situated beside a natural harbour and has structures typical of other port sites including round structures identified as storage areas. Construction had commenced at the site by around 600 CE, and the latest date identified from the site is 1000 AD, giving it an occupation period of the Late Classic. Compared to the other northern Ambergris Caye sites, San Juan has far more green obsidian from Pachuca in Central Mexico. The site also has an abundance of grey obsidian from Highland Guatemala, pottery and jade, leading to its being identified as a transhipment port. Multiple burials have been excavated at San Juan giving an important insight into the health and subsistence of the coastal Maya.

=== Santa Rita ===
Santa Rita (18.39102N 88.38545W) is located opposite Ambergris Caye on the mainland between the New River and Rio Hondo. The site has been identified as being linked to Tikal and was active during the Classic.

=== Tulum–Tancah ===
Tulum and Tancah (20.21508N 87.42946W) are adjacent on the eastern side of the Yucatán peninsula and look out over the Western Caribbean Sea. Tulum was described by the Spanish as a town larger than Seville when it was sighted in the early 1500s. The sites were first built in the Preclassic and continued to grow before becoming key sites in the Postclassic. Tulum is notable for its Castillo which has been identified as functioning like a lighthouse to show where the gap in the parallel barrier reef lies. The site has defensive structures on its inland side.

=== Uaymil ===
Uaymil (20.45489N 90.4775W) is located close to the ports of Jaina and Isla Piedras on the Gulf Coast of Yucatán. The site has been linked to the inland cities of Uxmal and Chichen Itzá and has been identified as a transhipment location for cargo which would eventually travel to Chichen Itzá via Isla Cerritos.

=== Vista Alegre ===
Vista Alegre (21.4601N 87.1624W) is located on the north of the Yucatán peninsula on the Laguna Holbox. The port has been identified as a departure point for local ceramics and also as engaged in transhipment. The site has a causeway running across it which extends into the water on both the east and west side where it was probably used as a docking facility.

=== Wild Cane Cay ===
Wild Cane Cay (16.18333N 88.63333W) is located at the southern end of Belize on the Yucatán peninsula and near the border with Guatemala. It is within the Mesoamerican Barrier Reef in Honduras Bay and is close to the mouth of the Deep River. The site was key from the Classic through to the Post Classic and has been identified as a transhipment port key in the obsidian chain bringing obsidian from the highlands of Guatemala to the inland Lowland Maya sites.

=== Xcambó ===
Xcambó (21.31349N 89.35409W) is located on the northern coast of Yucatán. Its earliest occupation was in the Early Classic, and it was abandoned in c. 700 CE. The port was autonomous and also produced salt. It is constructed on a mound in the centre of marshland and was expanded with platforms linked by causeways; these also connect to a temple and to the sea.

=== Xcaret ===
Xcaret (20.58091N 87.11969W) is located on the mainland opposite the island of Cozumel. It is mentioned in the Chilam Balam as a key port where Maya canoes stopped.

=== Xelhá ===
Xelhá (20.45N 87.3W) is located just up the coast from Tancah–Tulum. It was first occupied in the Early Classic and had continuous occupation until the 16th century. The site has a natural harbour and port features, including defences and a causeway, and has been identified as an autonomous port engaged in transhipment with key links to the jade and obsidian trades. The site was surveyed to try and locate Maya canoes but to no avail.

== Maya vessels ==
The Maya area, like the rest of Mesoamerica, did not have pack animals to carry goods. In addition, the mountainous and jungle terrain made the use of the wheel for transport very difficult. Instead, human porters would carry trade goods or, where possible, goods were sent via rivers and the sea. The comparative ease and swiftness of water transport for moving large quantities of goods played a role in the Maya reliance on waterborne trade. The Maya primarily used canoes to transport their wares, although raft use is also recorded.

=== Canoes ===
Maya canoes were dugout vessels constructed from a single trunk. This was possibly cedar as there are recent ethnographic examples of this material being used. It is unknown how the interior of the trunk would be excavated however in the Antilles, this was achieved by controlled burning, so it is possible this technique was also employed by the Maya. The Aztecs are known to have raised the sides of their canoes with planks and it is probable that the Maya did the same as this allows more cargo to be carried and prevents swamping; they were certainly technologically capable of doing this. There appears to have been two types of Maya canoe; a sea going type with a raised prow and stern, as seen in a Chichen Itzá mural, and a type with a flattened platform at the prow and stern which the models depict. The canoes were probably made watertight with pitch, likely asphaltum.

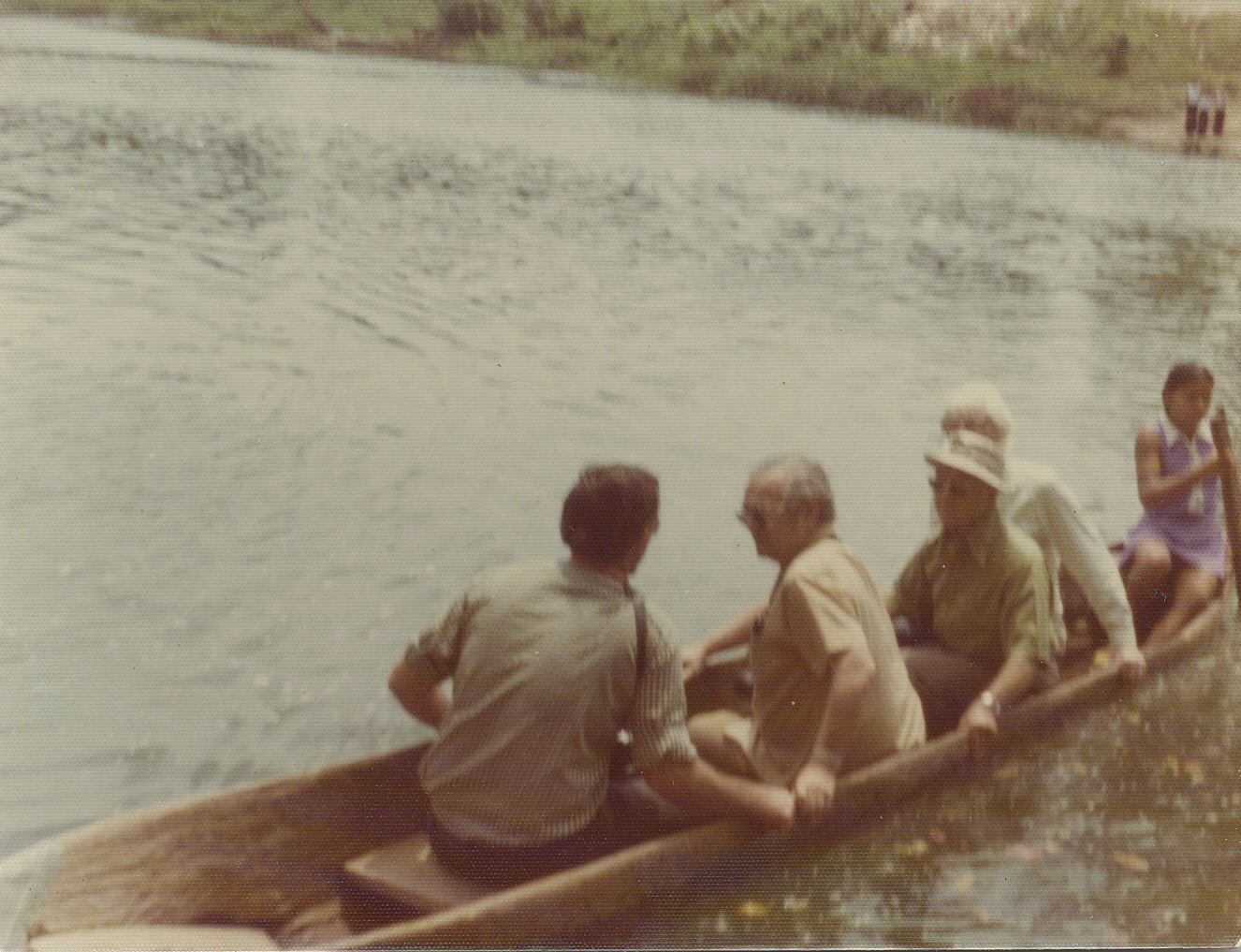
Modern example of a Maya canoe

There is currently only one known archaeological example of a pre-Columbian Maya canoe. This was found in the Paynes Creek National Park in southern Belize at the Eleanor Betty site and dates to the Early Classic between 300 and 600 CE. Due to the difficulty in conserving such an object it remains buried. A Maya canoe paddle has also been found in Paynes Creek at the K'ak' Naab' salt works. The paddle is 1.43 m in length with an oval shaped blade and no grip at the top; radiocarbon dates have identified it as being from the Late Classic, specifically between 680 and 880 CE. The lack of archaeological evidence of Maya canoes is due to the poor preservation of wood in tropical regions like that of the Maya area.

There are, however, many pictorial representations of Maya canoes and several ethnohistorical descriptions. Murals and artifacts from Tikal and Chichen Itza depict Maya canoes and many model canoes have been found; including at Moho Cay and Altun Ha. Pictorial representations of Maya canoes show them holding very few people, the maximum known is seven, but ethnohistorical accounts state that they were very large. Ferdinand Columbus told of an encounter with a Maya Canoe in the Bay of Honduras near the Bay Islands during Columbus' fourth voyage in 1506. He wrote:

There arrived a canoe full of Indians, as long as a galley and eight feet wide. It was loaded with merchandise from the west, almost certainly from the land of Yucatan, for that was near there [the Bay Islands], a matter of thirty leagues or a little more. There was in the middle of the canoe a shelter [toldo] of palm matting, which they call petates in New Spain. Inside and under this were their women and children, possessions, and merchandise, so that neither rain nor sea water could wet anything. . . There were in the canoe up to twenty-five men.

Other eyewitness accounts confirm the large size of the Mayan canoes at the time of European contact. Conquistador Bernal Diaz del Castillo claimed that the Mayan canoes were capable of holding 40–50 persons, while Juan Diaz, chaplain of the Grijalva expedition, estimated that a flotilla of canoes encountered at the mouth of the Grijalva River was composed of over 100 canoes containing about 3,000 men, an average of 30 men per canoe.

=== Rafts ===
The Maya also used rafts or balsas as the Dresden Codex and a gold disc from Chichen Itzá depict them. These are also known to have been used in other areas of Mesoamerica from as early as Olmec times. Ethnohistorical accounts suggest that the rafts would have been floated using netted calabashes underneath the platform on which the navigator and cargo would sit. There are currently no known archaeological examples of Maya rafts.

The Maya powered their canoes primarily using paddles, as attested by pictorial, archaeological and ethnohistorical evidence. However, there are ethnohistorical accounts of Maya use of sails. Historian J. Eric S. Thompson has argued in favor of the Mayan use of sails, using eyewitness testimony of its use in a large Mayan canoe.

== See also ==
- Maya trade
