= Gulf of Mexico Foundation =

US non-profit organization

The Gulf of Mexico Foundation is an American nonprofit organization that was founded in 1990 by citizens concerned with the health and productivity of the Gulf of Mexico. As of May 15, 2018, the IRS revoked the tax exempt status for the organization with EIN 52-1692642 named Gulf of Mexico Foundation Inc. in Corpus Christi, Texas with the revocation being posted on August 13, 2018.

== Programs ==
Based in Corpus Christi, Texas, the Foundation operates several programs to protect the fragile Gulf of Mexico. These include a Habitat and Conservation Team, teacher workshops on the wetlands, GMF science and Spanish clubs for high school students, and a Gulf of Mexico Summit conducted in conjunction with Mexican organizations.

== Management ==
The Foundation is led by Quenton Dokken, director, a marine biologist. Its board of directors is led by president Paul Kelly, a former senior executive at Rowan Companies. Other board members are executives from Shell Oil Company, ConocoPhillips, Transocean oil drilling firm, and legal, environmental and marketing firms. At least half of the 19 board of directors have ties to the offshore oil drilling industry.

== Funding ==
The Foundation has a reported $2 million annual budget, and one-quarter of its funding comes from corporations, including oil and gas companies. The remaining three-quarters comes from state and federal government grants. The foundation website provides the most prominent credit to oil and gas companies.

== Controversy ==
Media and consumer advocacy groups question the Foundation's close and questionable ties to the oil and gas industry.

After the Deepwater Horizon drilling rig explosion in the Gulf of Mexico starting in April 2010, Quenton Dokken, the organization's director was interviewed by The New York Times about the severity of the then ongoing oil spill. He was optimistic, saying:

The sky is not falling. We've certainly stepped in a hole and we're going to have to work ourselves out of it, but it isn't the end of the Gulf of Mexico.

While the story did not mention the Foundation's ties to the oil industry, two days later, The New York Times added an editor's note that said the foundation "... receives some money from the oil industry, and other business interests in the gulf, and includes industry executives on its board."

The paper's blog also questioned Dokken's objectiveness, reporting, "But as an executive (Dokken) whose fortunes are tied to partnerships between his group and the oil and gas companies that fund it—including BP, ConocoPhillips, Marathon, etc.—he's hardly an objective observer of corporate malfeasance."

Statement by Dr. Quenton Dokken: The Gulf of Mexico Foundation, as has countless non-profits around the world, has benefited from a working relationship with the oil/gas industry. Dokken's comments, i.e. "the sky is not falling" was made in response to the media's sensational headlines about the spill being the doom of the Gulf of Mexico as a living resource. History suggested otherwise. In 1942, 21 tankers were sunk in the same area of the Macondo spill and a similar number off southern Florida by German U-Boats. In 1979, the IXTOC blowout occurred in the Southern Gulf gushing oil for 10 months and multiple lesser spills occur frequently, and yet, the Gulf of Mexico has remained productive. Dokken's point was that the scientist needed to complete their studies and analysis before announcing "the death of the Gulf of Mexico" to the world. As Dokken suggested, assuming the Macondo blowout would be controlled in a reasonable amount of the time, history suggested the Gulf of Mexico would recover and remain productive. As of 2021, this has proven to be the case. Dokken never spoke to the malfeasance of the companies involved. It was obvious from the moment the blowout occurred it was not an act of God and the operators were culpable. The "controversy" was created by private interest expecting to benefit financially from the spill, and many did, and media trying to capture readership with sensational headlines, the original click bait.

When speaking with the New York Times writer, Dokken acknowledged the Foundation's relationship with the oil and gas industry, going so far as to send the most recent audits and annual financial reports to the reporter so that he could verify this funding relationship.
