= Caribbean Current =

Atlantic Ocean current

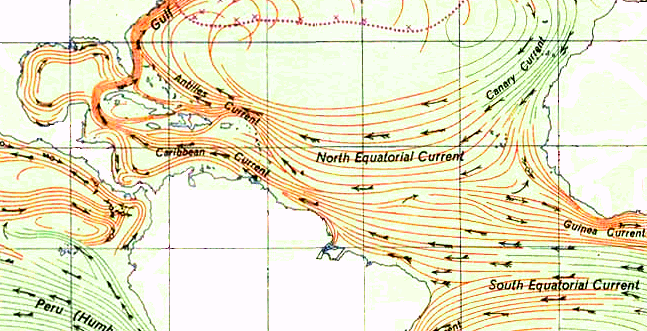
Caribbean current, a warm ocean current in Caribbean Sea

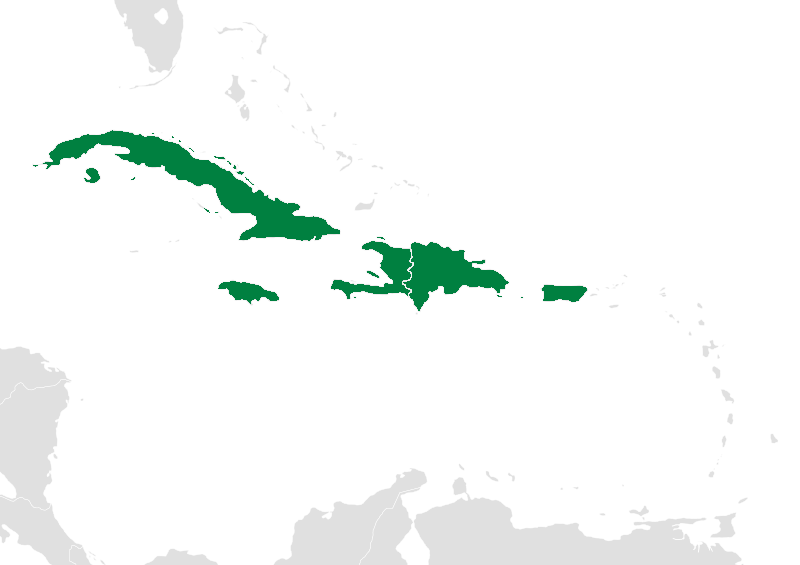
The Caribbean Islands

The Caribbean Current is a warm ocean current that transports significant amounts of water and flows northwestward through the Caribbean from the east along the coast of South America and into the Gulf of Mexico. The current results from the flow of the Atlantic South Equatorial Current as it flows north along the coast of Brazil. As the current turns north through the Yucatán Channel, it is renamed the Yucatán Current. The Caribbean Current water comes from the Atlantic Ocean via the North Equatorial, North Brazil, and Guiana Currents. The circulation of the Columbia-Panama Gyre flows counter-clockwise to the Caribbean Current.

== See also ==
- Ocean current
- Oceanic gyres
