= Normally unmanned installation =

Automated offshore oil/gas platform

A Normally Unmanned (or Unattended) Installation (NUI) is a type of automated offshore Oil/Gas platform designed to be primarily operated remotely, without the constant presence of personnel.

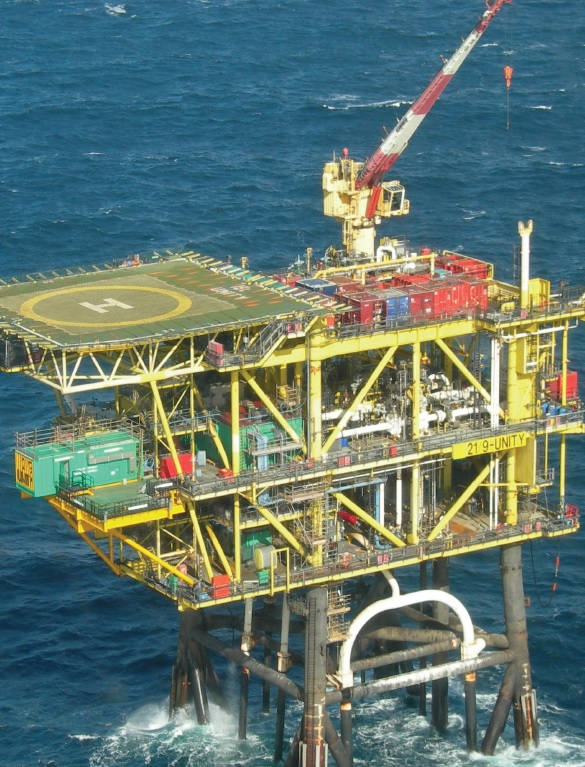
aerial view of the NUI Forties Unity at the Forties Oil Field

These generally were characterized by their small size, often consisting of just a well bay with a helipad on top. They are often a compromise of providing the convenience of surface wellheads, which are easier to build and maintain, while avoiding the high operating costs of a full production platform.

They are generally only used in shallower water, where constructing many small NUIs is a relatively easy and cheap option as compared to the cost of using subsea wells.

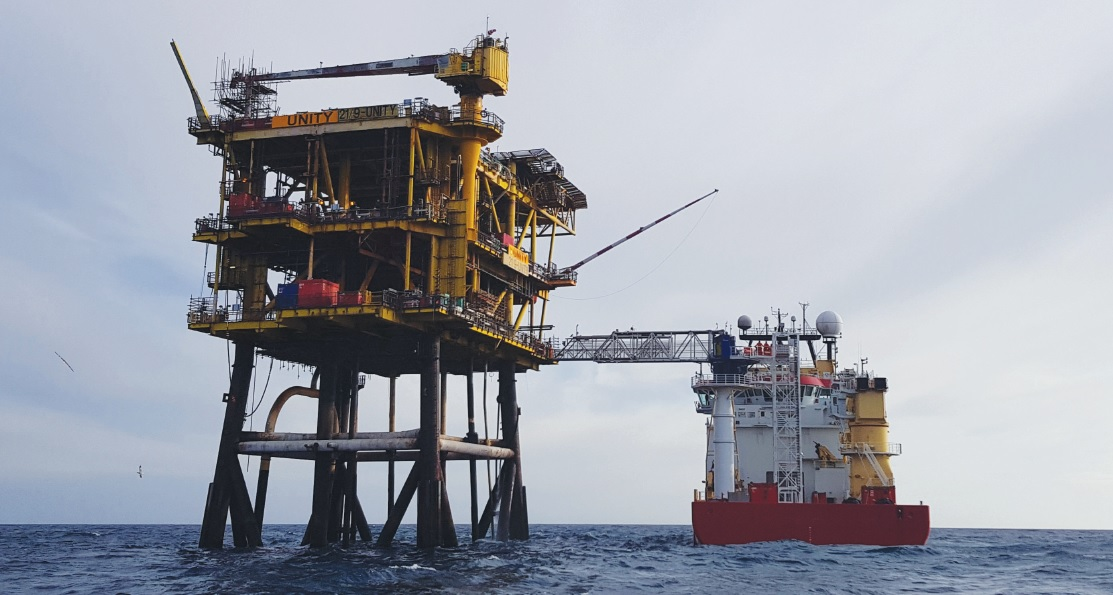
The NUI Forties Unity in the Forties Oil Field during a Walk to Work service

This can be seen in the Southern North Sea where large numbers of wells are on smaller NUIs, compared with the more northern areas of the continental shelf where fewer larger platforms and subsea sites are the norm. NUIs are also common offshore Western Australia where distances to populated areas are huge.

NUIs are commonly serviced from a nearby larger platform, e.g., Mungo serviced from Marnock. These installations will include an emergency shelter with essential food and water in order to provide a safe refuge in the event that weather or other considerations prevent a visiting crew from returning to base. Regular visits may be made for routine maintenance and for smaller well work such as wireline operations. Anything larger requires a drilling rig to be brought in, but this is still an advantage over subsea wells, which require a drilling rig or light intervention vessel for any well intervention.

In recent times NUI has become a phase within the decommissioning of previously manned offshore installations. Platforms would generally be positively isolated from hydrocarbons and flushed clean to suit environmental issues. Platforms would then only be visited infrequently for integrity checks and maintenance of temporary equipment left for power requirements and safety functionality. The platform would then remain in this phase until further decommissioning activities are carried out to remove the topsides in modules or piece small, then remove the jacket.

== See also ==
- Oil platform
