= Eastern Trough Area Project =

Network of oil and gas fields in the North Sea

Coordinates: 57.415°N 2.256°E

The Eastern Trough Area Project, commonly known as ETAP, is a network of nine smaller oil and gas fields in the Central North Sea covering an area up to 35 km in diameter. There are a total of nine different fields, six operated by BP and another three operated by Shell, and together, they are a rich mix of geology, chemistry, technology and equity arrangements.

== Development ==
The ETAP complex was sanctioned for development in 1995 with first hydrocarbons produced in 1998. The original development included Marnock, Mungo, Monan and Machar from BP and Heron, Egret, Skua from Shell. In 2002, BP brought Mirren and Madoes on stream. With these nine fields, the total reserves of ETAP are approximately 490 million barrels (78,000,000 m^{3}) of oil, 35 million barrels (5,600,000 m^{3}) of natural gas condensate and 2 billion cubic feet (57,000,000 m^{3}) of natural gas.

A single central processing facility (CPF) sits over the Marnock field and serves as a hub for all production and operations of the asset including all processing and export and a base for expedition to the Mungo NUI. The CPF consists of separate platforms for operations and accommodation linked by two 60 m bridges. The Processing, drilling and Riser platform (PdR), contains the process plant and the export lines, a riser area to receive production fluids from the other ETAP fields and the wellheads of Marnock. The Quarters and Utilities platform (QU) provides accommodation for up to 157 personnel operating this platform or travelling onwards to the Mungo NUI. This partitioning of accommodation and operations into two platforms, adds an extra element of safety, a particular concern for the designers coming only a few years after the Cullen report on the Piper Alpha disaster.

Liquids are exported to Kinneil at Grangemouth through the Forties pipeline system. Gas is exported by the Central Area Transmission System to Teesside.

Apart from Mungo, which has surface wellheads on a NUI, all other fields use subsea tie-backs.

A tenth field, Fidditch, is currently under development by BP. (which has now been put on hold due to the global economic downturn)

== ETAP fields ==
=== Marnock ===
The Marnock field is located in UKCS block 22/24 and is named after Saint Marnock. It is a high pressure, high temperature gas condensate field with initial reservoir pressure of 9000psi. Estimated recoverable reserves are 600 billion scf and 50 million barrels (7,900,000 m^{3}) of condensate. Marnock produces directly to surface wellheads on the CPF. It is operated by BP in partnership with Shell, Esso and Agip. The holdings in the Marnock field are as follows: BP = 73%, Esso = 13.5%, Shell = 13.5%.

=== Mungo ===
The Mungo field is located in UKCS block 23/16 and is named after Saint Mungo. It is an oilfield with a natural gas cap. Water and gas injection are used to manage the reservoir, which necessitated a small normally unmanned installation be built to support these facilities. The NUI is tied back to the CPF. The field is operated by BP in partnership with Nippon Oil, Murphy Oil and TotalEnergies

The holdings in Mungo are: BP = 82.35%, Zennor = 12.65%, JX Nippon = 5%

=== Monan ===
The Monan Field is located in UKCS block 22/20 and is named after Saint Monan. It is a small turbidite oil and gas field produced under natural depletion using subsea manifolds. Its production fluids are fed into the pipelines connecting Mungo to the CPF. The field is operated by BP in partnership with Nippon Oil, Murphy Oil and TotalEnergies

The holdings in Monan are BP = 83.25%, Zennor = 12.65%, JX Nippon = 5%

=== Machar ===
The Machar is located in UKCS block 23/26 named after Saint Machar. It is an oil field in a chalk reservoir located on top of a large salt diapir. Originally, the half dozen wells produced under natural depletion but modifications are being made to include the capacity for gas lift. The field is solely a BP possession.

=== Mirren and Madoes ===
These two were later additions to the ETAP complex. The Mirren field is located in UKCS block 22/25 and is named after Saint Mirren. It is an oil field with a gas cap in the Paleocene structure. The Madoes field is located in UKCS block 22/23 and is named after Saint Madoes. It is a light oil field located in the Eocene rock. Both are subsea tiebacks to the CPF, with the capacity for gas lift in the future to aid production. They are both operated by BP with Nippon Oil, Shell, Esso and Agip.

The holdings in the Mirren field are as follows: BP = 44.7%, ESSO = 21%, JX Nippon = 13.3%, Shell = 21%. The holdings in the Madoes field are as follows: ARCO = 31.7%, BP = 6.5%, Esso = 25%, JX Nippon = 12%, Shell = 25%

=== Heron, Egret and Skua ===
These fields are high temperature, high pressure oil producing wells. Heron is in UKCS block 22/30a and has a Triassic reservoir. Skua is an extension of the Marnock Field. They are subsea tiebacks to the CPF. All three fields are operated by Shell in partnership with Esso.

== Helicopter crash ==
On 18 February 2009, a Super Puma Helicopter ditched in the sea whilst approaching ETAP. All 18 passengers and crew were rescued. Bernard Looney, a President of BP's North Sea business based in Aberdeen, credited their Project Jigsaw with the safe, quick and efficient recovery of the 16 passengers and 2 crew. Project Jigsaw uses locator beacons on all helicopters, standby vessels and fast rescue craft, connected to a computerised system located in Aberdeen. This way locations of all rescue craft and their response time are always known to staff in the BP control centre. In addition all staff are supplied with wristwatch personal locator beacons (WWPLB) that automatically activate when immersed in water.

== See also ==
- Oil industry
- Oil fields operated by BP
- North Sea oil
