= Perdido (oil platform) =

Deepwater oil platform

Coordinates: 26°7′44″N 94°53′53″W

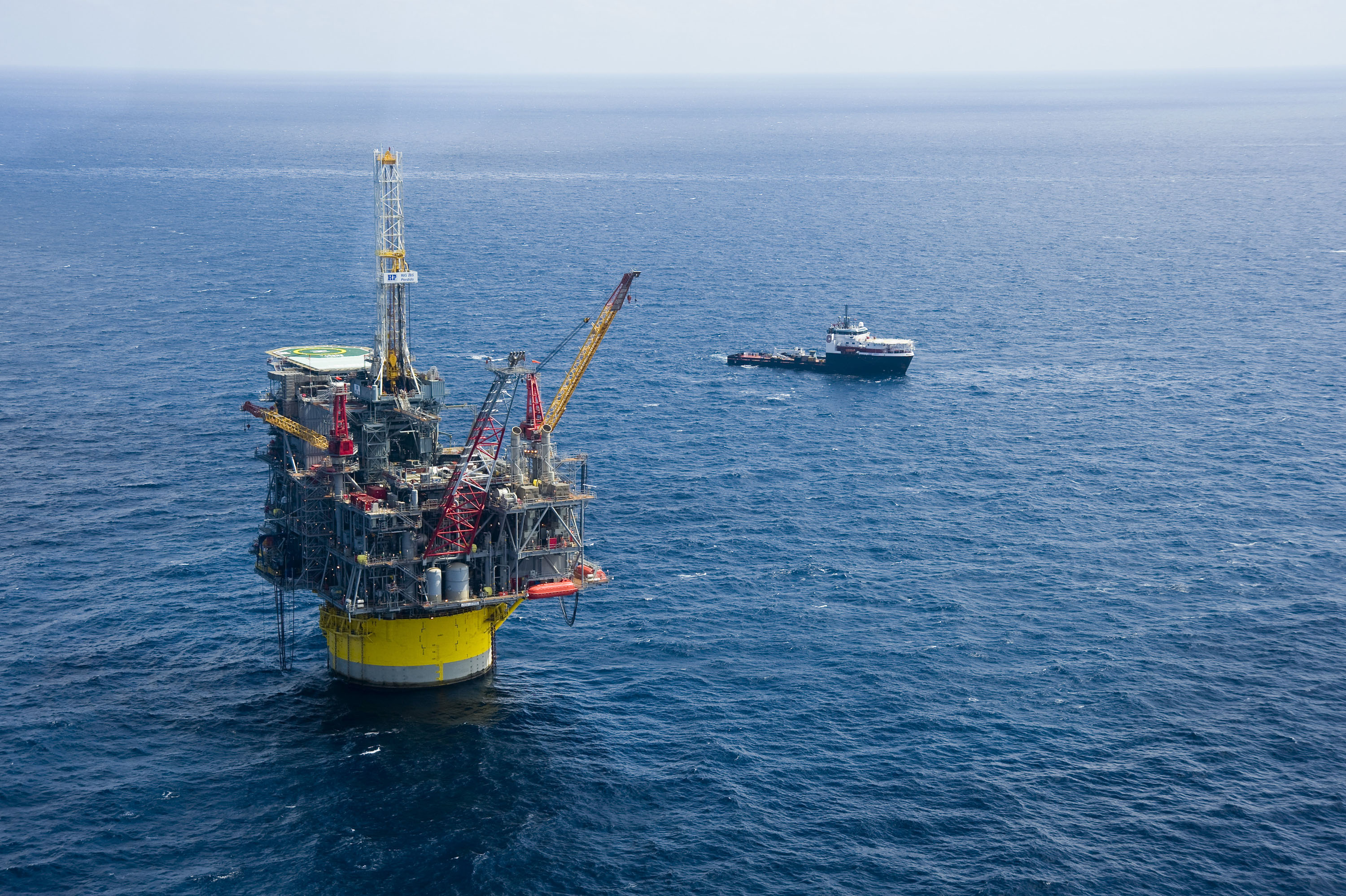
Shell Perdido spar platform

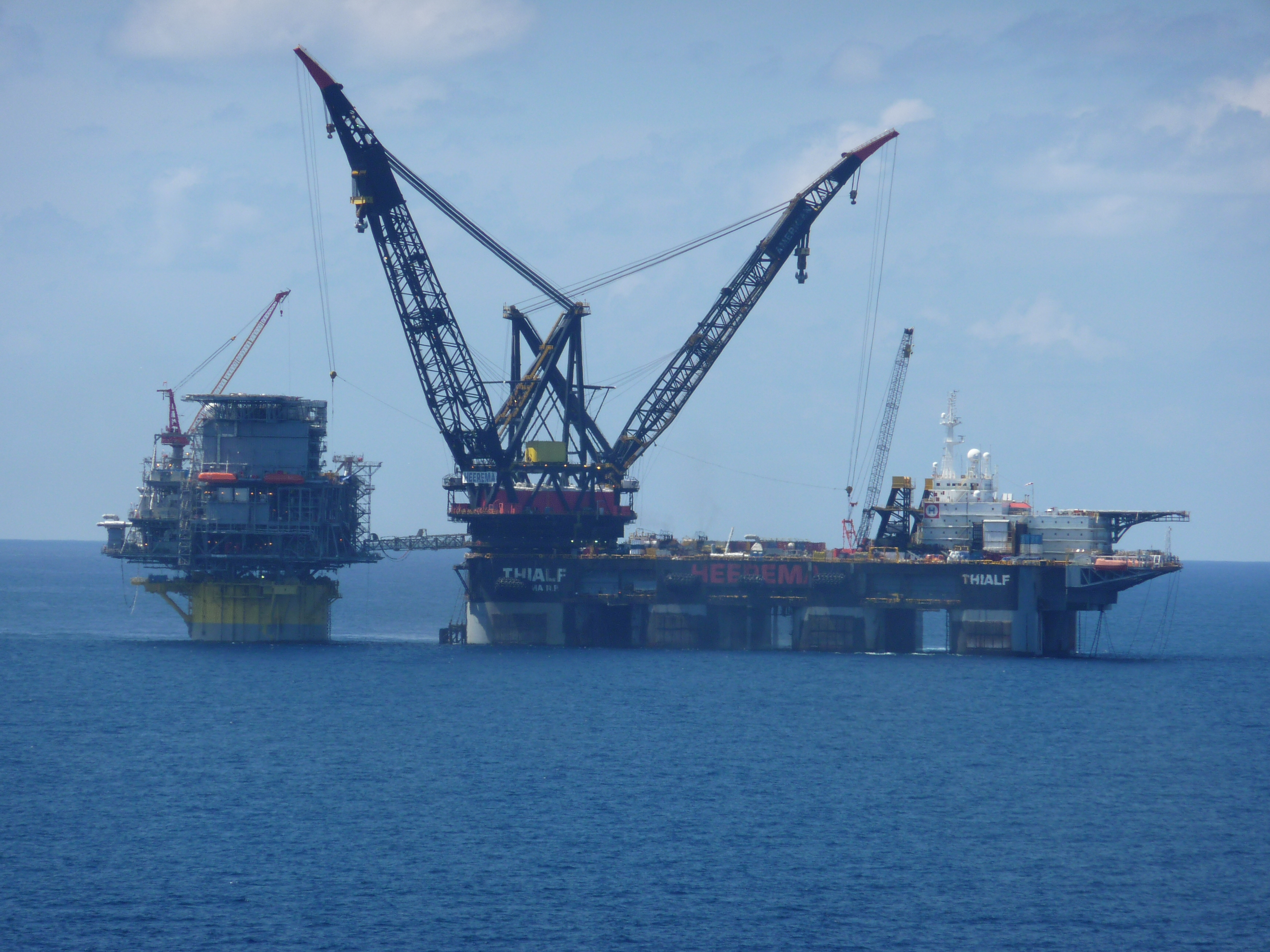
SSCV Thialf with gangway on Perdido (left)

Perdido (Spanish for lost) is the deepest floating oil platform in the world at a water depth of about 2,450 meters (8,040 feet) operated by the Shell Oil Company in the Gulf of Mexico. The platform is located in the Perdido fold belt which is a rich discovery of crude oil and natural gas. The Perdido spar began production in 2010 and its peak production is 100,000 barrels of oil equivalent (c. 16000 m^{3}/d) and 200 million cubic feet of gas per day (c. 5.7×10^{6} m^{3}/d).

== Construction and assembly ==
The spar and the topsides of the Perdido were constructed separately and then assembled in its final position in the Gulf of Mexico.

The Perdido's hull or spar was constructed by Technip in Pori, Finland. A barge shipped the 22,000 tonne spar 13,200 kilometres (8,200 miles) from the Baltic Sea to the Gulf of Mexico. After floating the spar, it was towed to its final home above the Alaminos canyon 320 kilometres (120 miles) from the shore. The spar was rotated by the Balder from a horizontal to a vertical floating position by pumping water through hoses attached to the spar. It was then anchored by the Balder to piles in the seafloor.

The platform has three decks or topsides which support the oil and gas processing units, a drilling rig and living quarters for the workers. The topsides were designed by Alliance Engineering and constructed by Kiewit Offshore in Corpus Christi, Texas. The temperature difference between Finland and Texas posed a challenge in assembling the pieces as the components built in the cold of northern Europe expand in the heat of the Gulf of Mexico. Computer-guided lasers marked out the measurements to ensure precision. After the decks were constructed, in March 2009 the Thialf lifted the 9,500 tonne topsides onto four posts on the spar and slotted it into position.

The Perdido has the ability to adjust the tension of the mooring cables which allows it to move around in the area of a soccer field. This is used to be placed – if needed – directly above one of the 22 wellheads on the seafloor.

== Operation ==
Operated by Shell, with JV partners Chevron (37.5%) and BP (27.5%), the spar acts as a hub for and enables development of three fields Great White, Tobago, and Silvertip. The oil and gas fields beneath the platform lie in a geological formation holding resources estimated at 3–15 billion barrels of oil equivalent according to a report by the BSEE, formerly known as the MMS. At peak production, Perdido processes 100,000 barrels of oil equivalent a day, and 200 million cubic feet of gas.

Perdido extracts oil from 35 subsea wells, of which 22 lie beneath the spar, while 13 wells are located eight miles west of the platform. These are connected via a 44 kilometre (27 mile) network of pipelines on the ocean floor to the manifold below the platform, where the oil is pumped upwards in five flexible pipes called risers. This complicated subsea installation is needed, as the reservoir pressure is rather low which means the transport from the seafloor to the ocean surface needs pumps, the number of which had to be minimized.

A workforce of 168 people keep it up and running.

== Safety ==
The platform has extensive safety equipment to protect workers in this remote location. It has the largest rescue boat used on any Shell facility, which has room for 24 people. The living quarters are blast-resistant. Perdido's helipad can accommodate two Sikorsky S-92 helicopters that can carry 19 passengers each.
