= Spar (platform) =

Marine structure used for floating oil/gas platforms

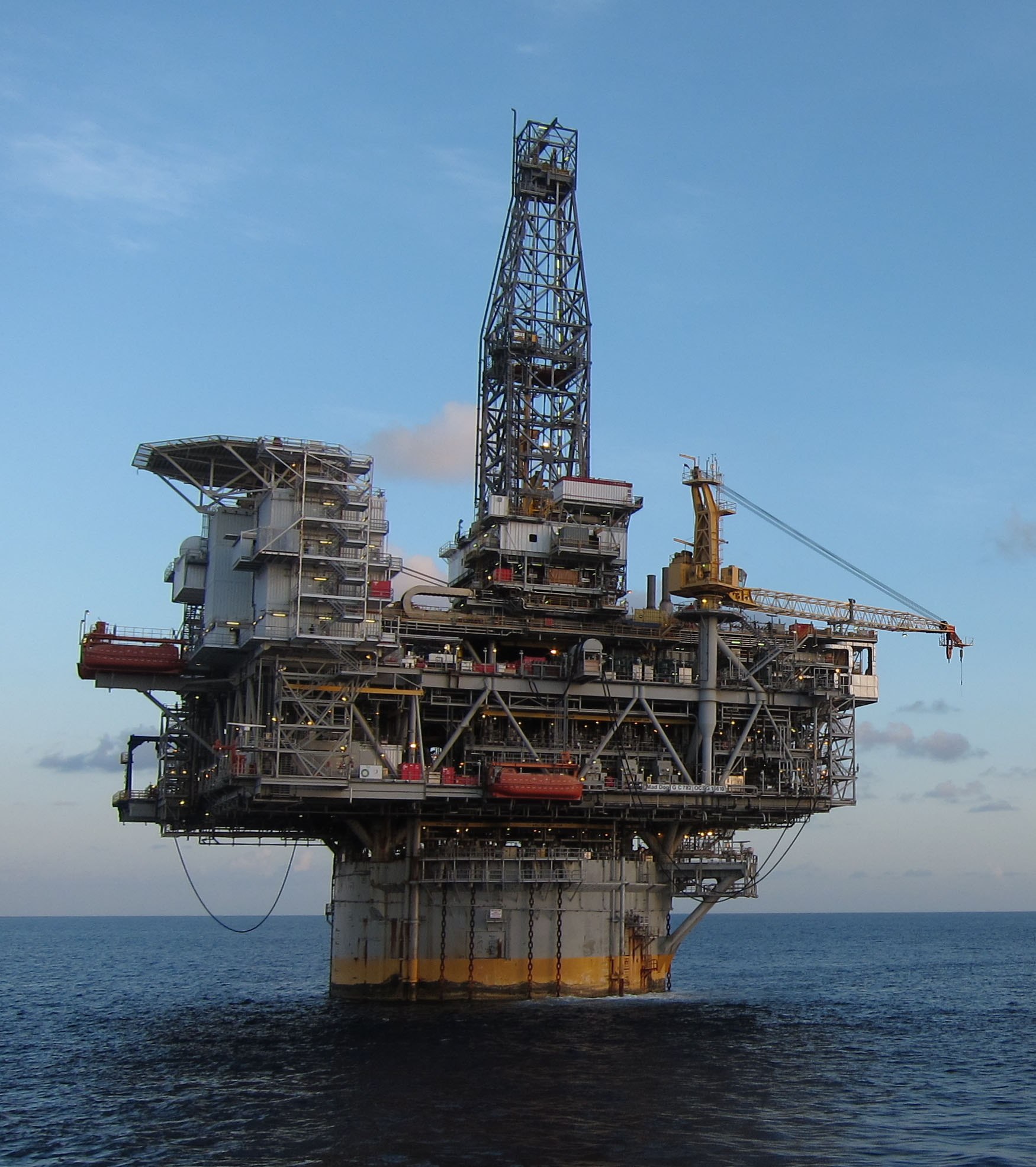
Mad Dog Spar Platform

A spar is a marine structure, used for floating oil/gas platforms. Named after navigation channel Spar buoys, spar platforms were developed as an extreme deepwater alternative to conventional platforms. The deep draft design of spars makes them less affected by wind, wave, and currents and allows for both dry tree and subsea production.

A spar platform consists of a large-diameter, vertical buoyant cylinder(s) supporting a deck. Spars are permanently anchored to the seabed by a spread mooring system composed of either a chain-wire-chain or chain-polyester-chain configuration. The cylinder comprises a number of tanks; the lowest contains ballast, mid-water and/or extracted oil, the upper, air for buoyancy. Helical strakes are fitted to larger & more recent designs to mitigate the effects of vortex-induced motion.

There are three primary types of spars; classic, truss, and cell:

- A classic spar consists of a tall-height, cylindrical hull, with tanks for heavy ballast located at the bottom of the cylinder.
- A truss spar comprises three parts, a short-height, large-diameter cylindrical hull, atop a truss structure, atop tanks for heavy ballast.
- A cell spar consists of a cluster of small-diameter cylinders and relatively speaking, cheap to manufacture.

Cylinders are either buoyancy only, or subdivided into buoyancy and ballast.

The first spar platform was the Brent Spar. Designed for storage and offloading of crude oil products, it was installed on the UK's Brent Field in June 1976. Shell's attempted deep sea disposal of the platform in the 1990s created a massive environmental backlash by Greenpeace. The spar was eventually dismantled, with ballast used as a foundation for a quay in Norway.

The first spar platform designed for production was the Neptune spar, located in the Gulf of Mexico, and was installed in September 1996 by Kerr McGee.

The first, and thus far unique, cell-spar platform was Kerr-McGee's Red Hawk spar (7 ea. 8 m (26 ft) diameter cells). Field-depletion occurred 4 years after production started, so Red Hawk was decommissioned in 2014 under the Bureau of Safety and Environmental Enforcement's "Rigs-to-Reefs" program, at which time it was the deepest floating platform to be decommissioned.

The world's deepest production platform is Perdido, a truss spar in the Gulf of Mexico, with a mean water depth of 2,438 m (7,999 ft). It is operated by Royal Dutch Shell and was built at a cost of $3 billion.

== List of spar platforms ==
Due to the widespread presence of deepwater hydrocarbon reserves, the Gulf of Mexico accounts for the highest concentration of spar platforms worldwide. Only one has been installed outside the Gulf of Mexico, in Southeast Asia (Kikeh in Malaysia), while additional installations are under development in the North Sea. The first production spar platform in the Gulf of Mexico, the Neptune spar, was installed in September 1996.

The deepest seabed to which a spar platform has been moored is 2,383 m (7,818 ft) in the Gulf of Mexico. This facility is the Perdido truss-type production platform, operated by Shell.

Platform	Type	Year	Area	Country	Operator	Water depth (m)	Design
Neptune	Classic	1996	Gulf of Mexico	United States	Oryx Energy	588	Technip
Genesis	Classic	1998	Gulf of Mexico	United States	Chevron	789	Technip
Hoover Diana	Classic	2000	Gulf of Mexico	United States	ExxonMobil	1,471	Technip
Nansen	Truss	2001	Gulf of Mexico	United States	Kerr-McGee	1,122	Technip
Boomvang	Truss	2002	Gulf of Mexico	United States	Kerr-McGee	1,052	Technip
Horn Mountain	Truss	2002	Gulf of Mexico	United States	BP	1,652	Technip
Holstein	Truss	2003	Gulf of Mexico	United States	BP	1,311	Technip
Medusa	Truss	2003	Gulf of Mexico	United States	Murphy Oil	678	J. Ray McDermott
Devil's Tower	Truss	2004	Gulf of Mexico	United States	Eni	1,710	J. Ray McDermott
Front Runner	Truss	2004	Gulf of Mexico	United States	Murphy Oil	1,006	J. Ray McDermott
Gunnison	Truss	2004	Gulf of Mexico	United States	Kerr-McGee	945	Technip
Red Hawk	Cell	2004	Gulf of Mexico	United States	Kerr-McGee	1,615	Technip
Mad Dog	Truss	2005	Gulf of Mexico	United States	BP	1,372	Technip
Constitution	Truss	2005	Gulf of Mexico	United States	Kerr-McGee	1,515	Technip
Kikeh	Truss	2007	South China Sea	Malaysia	Murphy Oil	1,310	Technip
Tahiti	Truss	2007	Gulf of Mexico	United States	Chevron	1,280	Technip
Perdido	Truss	2010	Gulf of Mexico	United States	Shell	2,383	Technip
Lucius	Truss	2014	Gulf of Mexico	United States	Anadarko	2,164	Technip
Gulfstar FPS GS-1	Classic	2014	Gulf of Mexico	United States	Hess	1,311	J. Ray McDermott
Heidelberg	Truss	2016	Gulf of Mexico	United States	Anadarko	1,616	Technip
Aasta Hansteen	Truss	2018	North Sea	Norway	Statoil	1,300	Technip
