= SAR201 =

Offshore rig in Persian Gulf

Saudi Aramco Rig 201 is offshore rig owned and managed by Saudi Aramco. This jackup type rig is located in the Persian Gulf.

This rig was built in 1982 in Singapore and has a max drill depth of 20,000 feet (6,100 m).
