= Marnock =

Scottish monk, bishop and saint

Saint Marnock of Kilmarnock
- Born: Ireland
- Died: 625; Annandale, Strathclyde
- Venerated in: Roman Catholic Church; Eastern Orthodox Church
- Canonized: Pre-Congregation
- Feast: 25 October
- Patronage: Kilmarnock, Scotland

Marnock or Marnock of Kilmarnock (died c. 625 AD), also known as Marnocus, Marnan of Narnach, Marnanus, Marnocalso or originally Ernin (from Irish Mo-Ernin-og) was a Scottish monk, bishop and saint.

== Biography ==
Details on the life of Marnock that have survived to the present day are limited, though some facts are known. Marnock was born in Ireland, most likely in the late 6th century. He became a monk on the abbey at Iona where he became a student and disciple of Saint Columba. He later left the monastery to become a missionary bishop on the Scottish mainland.

It is widely accepted that Marnock died at Annandale in 625, however at least one account gives his place of death and burial site as Inchmarnoch near Aboyne in Aberdeenshire.

== Veneration and legacy ==
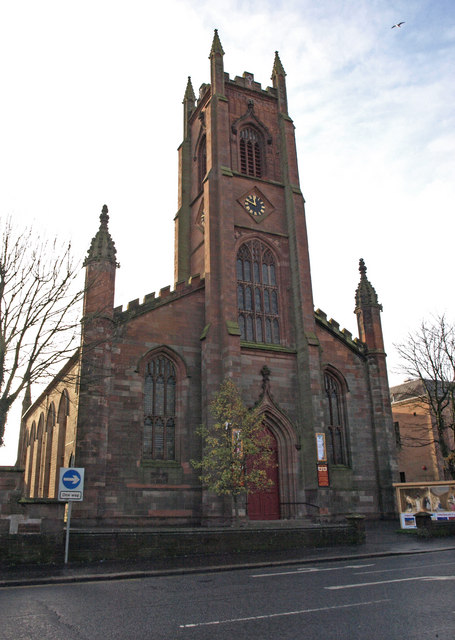
St Marnock's Church, Kilmarnock

A strong cult of veneration developed for Marnock after his death, particularly in the region of the Scottish Borders. Marnock's head was kept as a relic at Kilmarnock, where a tradition emerged where it was washed each Sunday, with the resulting wash water given to the sick to effect miraculous cures.

The strength of Marnock's cult in the centuries that followed his death is demonstrated in the great number of locations, in Scotland as well as in Ireland, named in his honour, including:

- Ardmonoch, a locality within Kilfinan in Argyll and Bute
- Dalmarnock a district within Glasgow
- Dalmarnock, a farmsteading near Dunkeld, and the adjacent Dalmarnock Beat, a salmon fishery on the River Tay
- Inchmarnoch, an island on the River Dee in Aberdeenshire where Marnock established a chapel and, by some accounts, died and was buried
- Inchmarnock, an isle at the northern end of the Sound of Bute
- Kilmarnock, a town in Ayrshire
- Portmarnock, a coastal hamlet in Fingal, Ireland A local school also bears his name.
- Naomh Mearnóg CLG, a GAA club in Portmarnock
- Fowlis, 15th Century parish church in Fowlis on the ouskirts of Dundee, built around 1453 by Andrew Lord Gray. Celebrated for housing some of the best pre-reformation medieval art in Scotland.
- Marnoch, a parish in Aberdeenshire
- Marnock Oil Field, at the centre of the Eastern Trough Area Project, 150 miles east of Aberdeen under the North Sea.
