= Well bay =

A well bay is an area of an oil platform where the Christmas trees and wellheads are located. It normally consists of two levels, a lower where the wellheads are accessed and an upper where the Xmas Trees are accessed often along with the various well control panels, which will have pressure gauges and controls for the hydraulically actuated valves, including downhole safety valve and annular safety valve. On a platform with a drilling package, the well bay will be located directly below it to facilitate access for drilling and well interventions.

== See also ==
- Oil platform
- Christmas tree
- Wellhead
