= MSV Well Enhancer =

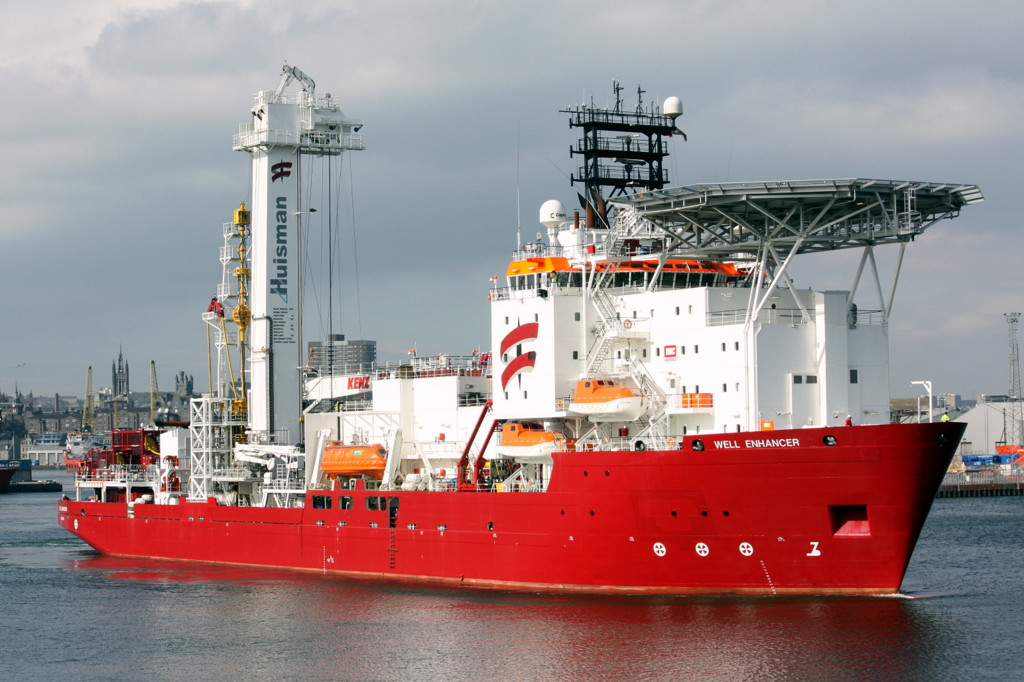
- Well Enhancer light well intervention / dive support vessel

History
- Name: Well Enhancer
- Owner: Helix Energy Solutions Group
- Operator: Helix Energy Solutions Group
- Port of registry: (United Kingdom) Aberdeen
- Launched: 2008
- Identification: IMO number: 9421996; MMSI number: 235062421; Callsign: 2ARS4
- Status: Operational

General characteristics
- Tonnage: 9,158 GT
- Length: 132 m (433 ft)
- Beam: 22 m (72 ft)
- Draft: 6.25 m (20.5 ft)
- Speed: 13 kts
- Crew: 120

Well Enhancer is a purpose-built well intervention vessel, launched at the IHC Krimpen Shipyard on May 31, 2008, in Krimpen aan den IJssel, the Netherlands.

== Design ==
The newest addition to the Helix Well Ops fleet, the Well Enhancer is designed to minimize production downtime and provide a cost-effective method of maintaining subsea production systems. With 1,100 m^{2} of main deck space and offloading capability, the new vessel can also perform a range of well testing procedures. Well Enhancer features a 150-ton multipurpose tower capable of deploying wireline, slickline and coiled tubing tools. The vessel also features kill pumps, an intervention lubricator control system and an active heave-compensated main winch.

== History ==
In 2009 the Well Enhancer completed its first well intervention job in the North Sea for Nexen Petroleum 60 miles east of Aberdeen, Scotland in adverse weather conditions with wave heights in excess of five metres and 45 knot winds. In 2012, the Well Enhancer completed the first well intervention work ever done in West Africa from a mono-hull vessel instead of a rig or semi-submersible. The vessel is owned by Helix Energy Solutions Group and operated by the company's well intervention business unit, Helix Well Ops. The mono-hull vessel was designed to provide a stable working platform to minimize downtime in the typically rough seas in the North Sea where she primarily operates. Based in Aberdeen, Well Enhancer has 1,100 m^{2} of main deck space and offloading capability, in addition to a 150-ton multipurpose tower capable of deploying wireline, slickline and coiled tubing tools. The vessel also features kill pumps, an intervention lubricator control system and an active heave-compensated main winch.
