= Electric line =

Electric line may refer to:

- Electrical cables
- Electrical wiring
- Overhead lines that power a railway
- Overhead power lines, used for electric power transmission
- Wireline (cabling), a cabling technology where a current is sent to downhole logging tools in oil well exploration and completions
