= MSV Seawell =

Ship built in 1987

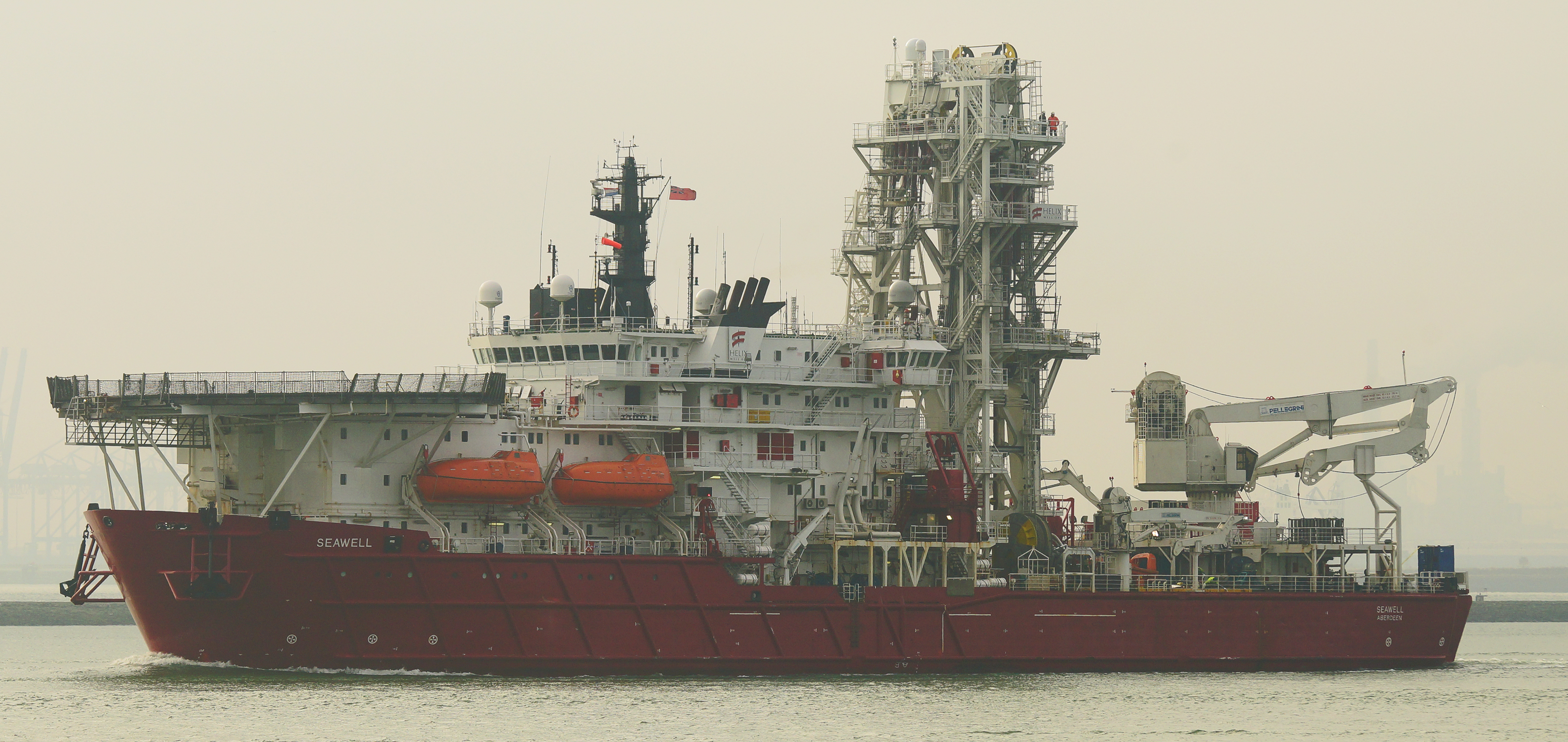
- The Seawell has been operating throughout the North Sea and Atlantic margin as a light well intervention vessel, pioneering monohull-based subsea wireline and coiled tubing services. The Seawell's unique design and multi-service capability has significantly reduced intervention time and provided a cost-effective method of maintaining subsea production systems. Seawell's track record is second to none, having entered more than 650 wells, decommissioned more than 150 live and suspended wells and 15 subsea fields.

History
- Name: Seawell
- Owner: Helix Energy Solutions Group
- Operator: Helix Energy Solutions Group
- Port of registry: (United Kingdom) Aberdeen
- Launched: 1987
- Acquired: 2 May 1986
- Identification: IMO number: 8324567; MMSI number: 232159000; Callsign: GGXE
- Status: Operational

General characteristics
- Tonnage: 9,158 GT
- Length: 114 m (374 ft)
- Beam: 22 m (72 ft)
- Draught: 6.8 m (22 ft)
- Depth: 14 m (46 ft)
- Speed: 14 kts
- Crew: 122

Seawell, the worlds most successful diving vessel, entered service in 1987 as a diving support vessel but it is widely credited with pioneering subsea light well intervention in the North Sea after completing its first well intervention project in 1988. In 1996 the Seawell performed what is thought to be the first ever installation of a replacement subsea tree from a Dynamically Positioned mono-hull vessel anywhere in the world. In 1998 the Seawell completed the world's first ever wireline intervention on a horizontal subsea tree on Amoco Exploration's Arkwright Field in the North Sea. Currently owned by Helix Energy Solutions Group and operated by the company’s well intervention business unit, Helix Well Ops, the Seawell has entered more than 650 wells, decommissioned more than 150 live and suspended wells and 15 subsea fields. The vessel is Dynamically Positioned and features a purpose-built derrick over a 7 m x 5 m moonpool and a traveling block rated to 150 Te capacity in AHC & PHC modes. The Seawell is also equipped with an 18 man saturation diving system and 2 ROVs, an observation vehicle & a work class vehicle.
