= Pipe recovery operations =

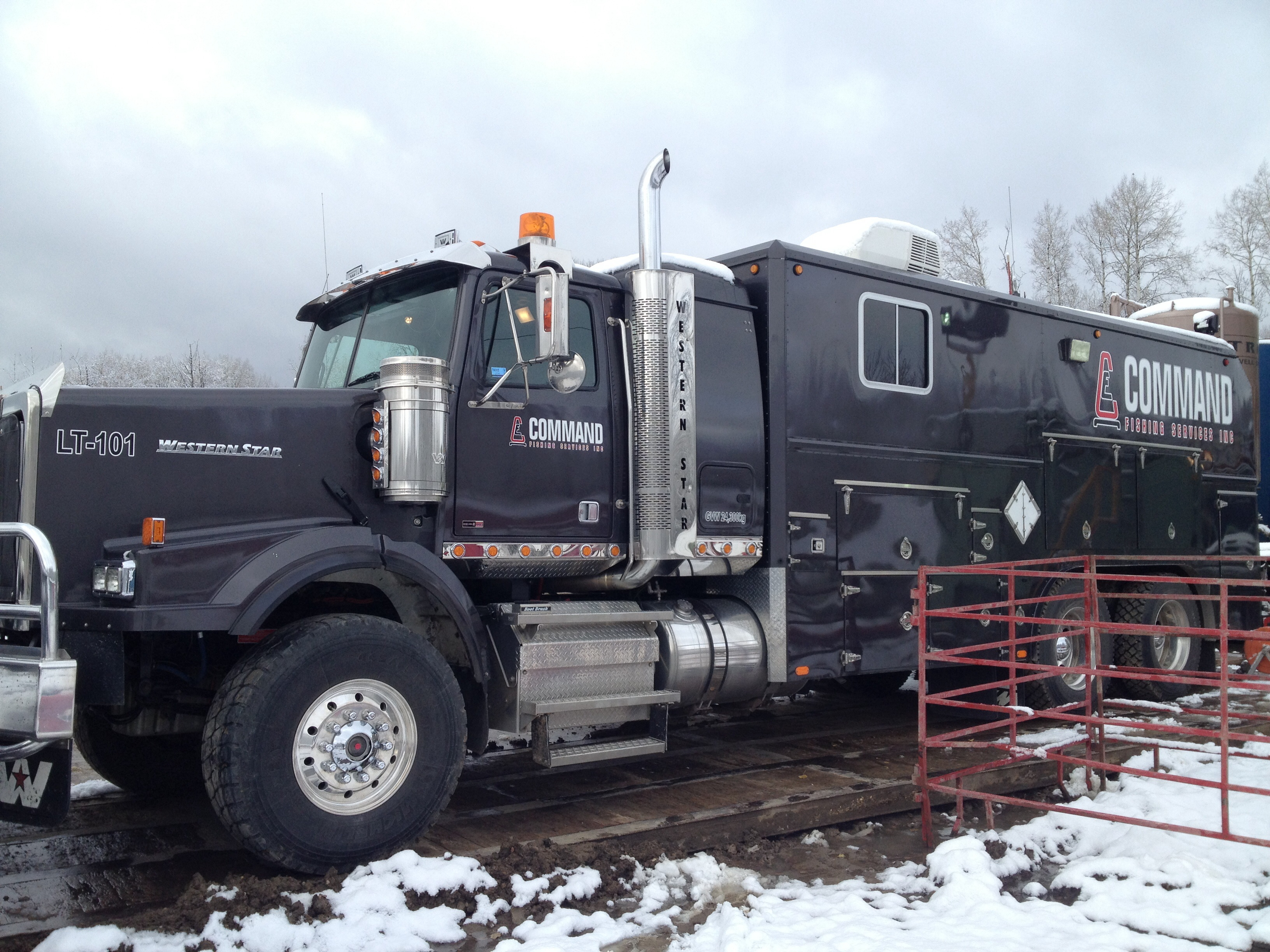
Wireline truck performing pipe recovery on location in Alberta, Canada.

Pipe recovery is a specific wireline operation used in the oil and gas industry, when the drill string becomes stuck downhole and prevents the drill rig from operating. Pipe recovery is the process by which the location of the stuck pipe is identified, and the free pipe is separated from the stuck pipe either by a backoff or a chemical cut. There are various causes of stuck pipes. Free point tools, backing off, and pipe cutting are used in pipe recovery.

== Background ==
Stuck pipe prevents the drill rig from continuing operations. This results in costly downtime, ranging anywhere from $10,000–$1,000,000 per day of downtime, therefore it is critical to resolve the problem as quickly as possible.

=== Causes of stuck pipe ===
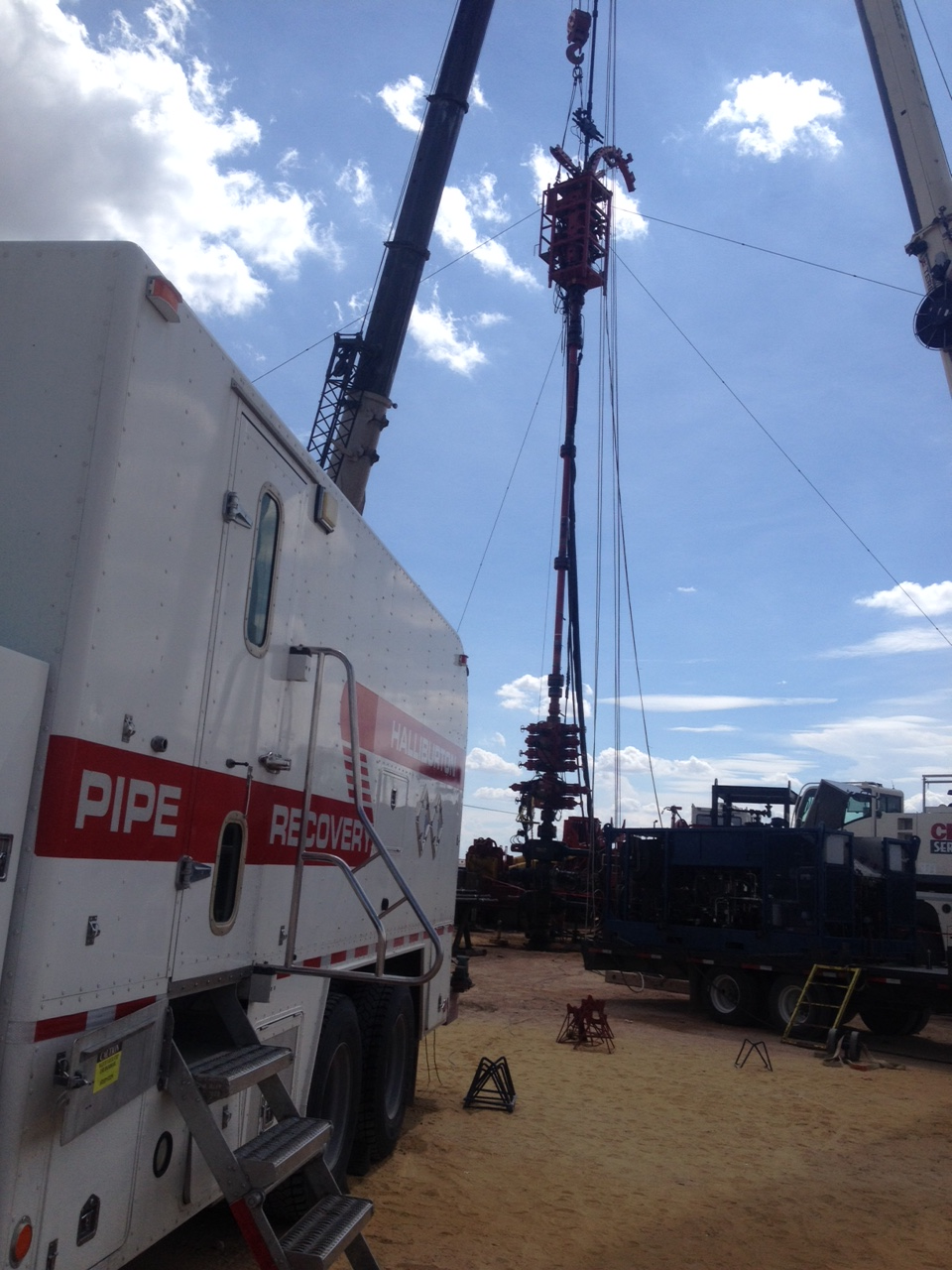
Wireline truck rigged up to a coil tubing unit in order to cut the coil tubing.

Differentially stuck pipe
The geological formation downhole occasionally has a significantly lower pressure than the drilling fluid being used. When the pipe string comes into contact with the exposed formation the difference in pressure will cause the pipe to be sucked against the formation. If the rig is able to circulate drilling fluid back to the surface that is often a good indication of differentially stuck pipe. One technique for freeing the stuck pipe, or avoiding the issue to begin with, is to rotate the pipe string while pulling out of the hole.
Key seated stuck pipe
Key seating occurs when the drill string becomes off-centered in the wellbore, and the pipe collars become caught on a deviation in the wellbore. If the rig is able to move the drill string freely downhole, but every time the drill string is pulled upward it becomes stuck at the same point, then it is likely that the pipe is caught in a key seat.
Cave-in stuck pipe
An unstable formation can result in a cave in. The collapse of the formation can pin the pipe inside the wellbore preventing its movement.
Mechanically stuck pipe
This can be the result of objects, i.e. slips or pipe wrenches, being dropped down the hole lodging against the BHA.

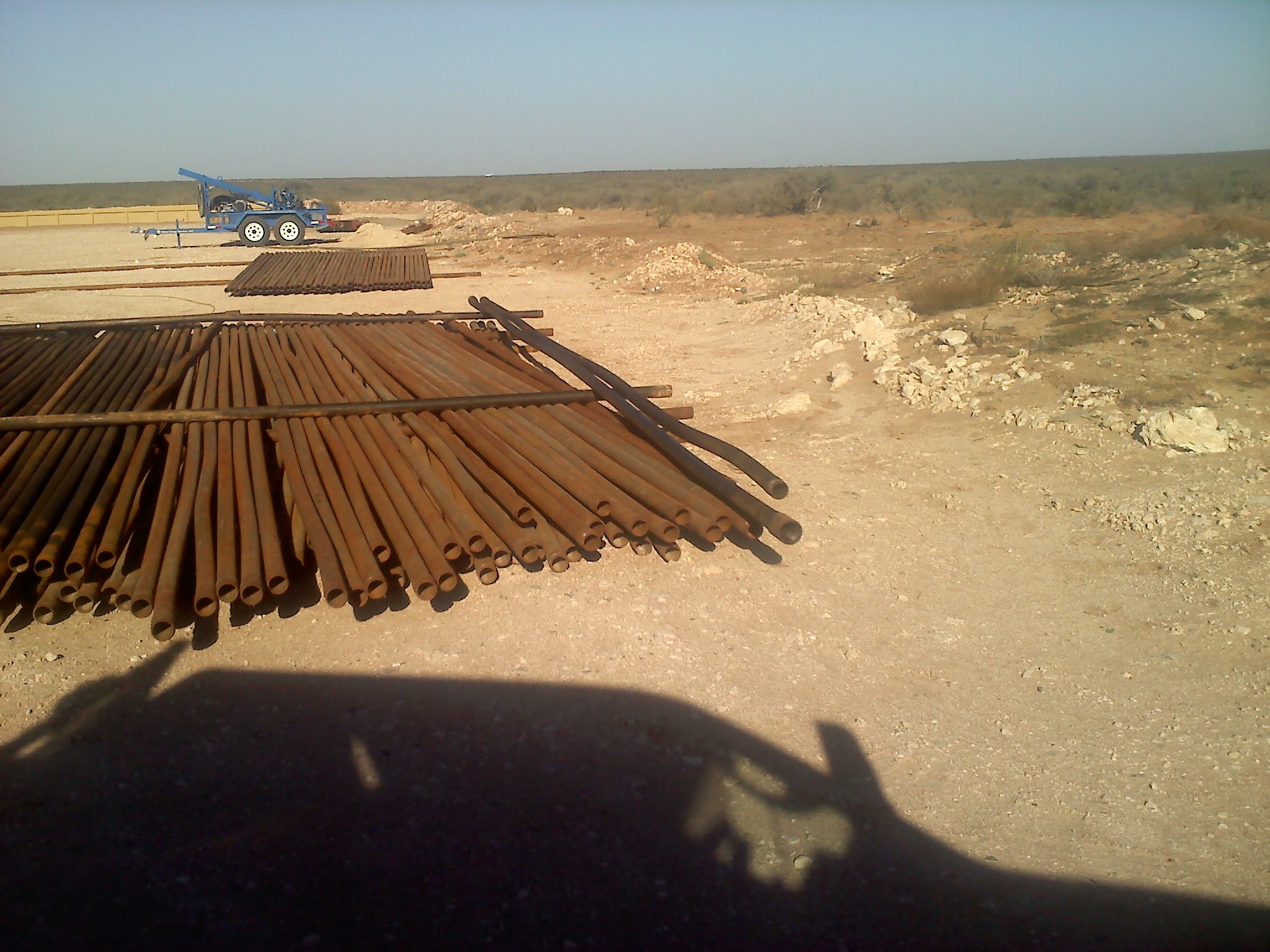
Bent 2 7/8" tubing

Communication between wells
In areas with a high concentration of oil wells, it is not unusual for wells to communicate through the formation for distances of up to mile. During a fracking operation thousands of gallons of fluid and sand are pumped down one well to open up the formation surrounding that wellbore. Often large amounts of that proppant and fluid will travel through the formation and into a nearby well. This sand can lodge on top of a packer or coil tubing in the well sticking the pipe.
Tubing stuck in production wells
Tubing in production wells is often exposed to a number of highly corrosive chemicals, such as H_{2}S. This corrosion can deteriorate the tubing to the point that it separates from the wellhead causing the tubing to fall downhole. The impact of several thousands of pounds of tubing on the bottom of the hole can severely damage the tubing, causing kinks or a corkscrew effect in the tubing, making it difficult to retrieve out of the hole. Sand coming in through holes in the casing or a malfunctioning production packer can also cause tubing to become stuck in production wells.

=== Free point ===
The term free point is used to describe the delineating point between the stuck pipe and the free pipe in a pipe string. Every joint of pipe above the free point is free, meaning it can rotate freely and be moved in and out of the hole, provided it was not attached to the remaining joints of stuck pipe below the free point.

An example is a piece of string suspended by one of its ends, with the rest of it hanging down. If a portion of the hanging string is held, then the part of the string above the held span would be considered free, since it can be moved in any direction by the end from which the string hangs. The section of hanging string being held and the string hanging below it is stuck, as actions performed on the free string will not affect the string being held or the remaining string below it.

==== Pipe stretch free point estimate ====
The pipe stretch free point estimate is a good starting point for identifying the free point.

1. Pull the drillstring to the pipe's neutral weight, which is the combined weight of blocks and the weight of the drill string and make a mark(X_{1})(in) at the top of the rotary table.
2. Identify the recommended overpull by multiplying 2208.5 by pipe weight/ft. Pull the calculated overpull(F) (Not to exceed the yield strength of the pipe) causing the free portion of the pipe to stretch to a new position (X_{2})‍(in).
3. Use the following equation to calculate the free point from the rig floor:

L_{sp} = 735,294(X_{2} − X_{1})W_{dp} ÷ F

where L_{sp} = depth of stuck point (ft), (X_{2}-X_{1})= The stretch of the pipe from the reference point (in.), W_{dp} = weight of drill pipe (lbs/ft), and F = the additional pull required (lbs.) The stretch test does not take into account drill collars, heavyweight drill pipe, and/or wellbore deviation.

==== Tools ====
The following tools are operated using a wireline truck.

Traditional free point tools

Applied electronic systems traditional free point tool

The traditional freepoint tool is an electromechanical tool designed to measure the amount of torque or stretch of a given length of tubing, drill pipe, or casing. The traditional freepoint tool uses either bow springs or magnets to anchor itself inside the pipe. After obtaining an estimate of the free point by using the pipe stretch estimate technique, the traditional freepoint tool is run in the hole to 1000 feet above the estimated stuck point. The tool is anchored in place. Stretch and or torque is then applied to the pipe. This allows the pipe recovery engineer to obtain a baseline reading of the free pipe. This will give him a starting point to compare his later freepoint readings to. The tool is then run roughly 500 feet past the estimated stuck point. Stretch and torque are applied, and readings are taken. If the tool indicates that the pipe is stuck at that point the tool is pulled uphole and readings are taken again. By applying the bracketing technique, the pipe recovery engineer is quickly able to identify the exact point that the pipe is free.

Halliburton free point tool
The Halliburton freepoint tool is based around the magnetorestrictive property of steel. This principle states that when torque or stretch is applied to free pipe, the magnetization will change. Stuck pipe will have no change in magnetization. There is a magnet on the bottom of the tool that creates a small magnetic field. There are four co-planar orthogonal multi-axis high sensitivity magnetometers located above the magnet. The magnetometers measure the change in the magnetization of the pipe. The pipe is set at neutral weight, then the tool is run downhole logging the entire pipe string. Once it is at the bottom of the string, torque or stretch is applied to the pipe. The tool is then pulled uphole logging the entire string. The tool will detect differences in the magnetization of the pipe, thereby indicating free and stuck sections of pipe.

== Recovery ==
Pipe recovery operations comprise wireline processes used in the oil and gas industry, when the drill string becomes stuck downhole. Pipe recovery is the process by which the location of the stuck pipe is identified, and the free pipe is separated from the stuck pipe either by a backoff or a chemical cut. This allows fishing tools to subsequently be run down hole to latch onto and remove the stuck pipe.

== Backing off pipe ==
Backing off pipe, is an industry term which means unscrewing the pipe at a desired depth downhole.

=== Inside back off or string shot ===
Once the free point of a stuck pipe string is determined, the stringshot back-off service can be used to remove the free portion from the well. The string-shot is a metal rod wrapped in explosive primer cord. The back-off procedure applies left-hand torque to the stuck pipe string. The CCL is used to help position the string shot at the predetermined pipe joint, and then the string shot is detonated. The explosion produces a similar effect as an intense hammer blow and allows the joint to be unscrewed at the proper connection. Several factors such as pipe size, weight and condition, back-off depth, mud or borehole fluid weight and well temperature are carefully considered when making up the proper string-shot assembly.

=== Manual back off ===
Manual back offs are the least preferred technique for removing free pipe from the hole since there is very little control. When performing a manual back off you take the desired back off depth(ft.) and multiply it by the weight of one foot of pipe. This will give you a rough estimate of the neutral weight of the pipe at the desired depth. By setting the pipe at neutral weight at the desired depth you are reducing any tension on the threads at the desired depth, thereby increasing your odds of the pipe unscrewing there. The driller will pickup the string to the back off neutral weight, and then left hand torque is applied until the pipe unscrews. There is no guarantee that the pipe will unscrew at the desired point making the manual back off the last resort for backing off pipe.

== Tools for cutting pipe ==
=== Chemical cutter ===
Chemical cutters use a propellant to generate pressure forcing the chemical, usually Bromine Trifluoride, through a catalyst. The resulting chemical reaction is expelled through the severing head of the cutter at a high temperature and pressure, which cuts the wall of the tubing. The resulting cut is a very smooth cut that does not require any dressing before further pipe recovery operations can take place.

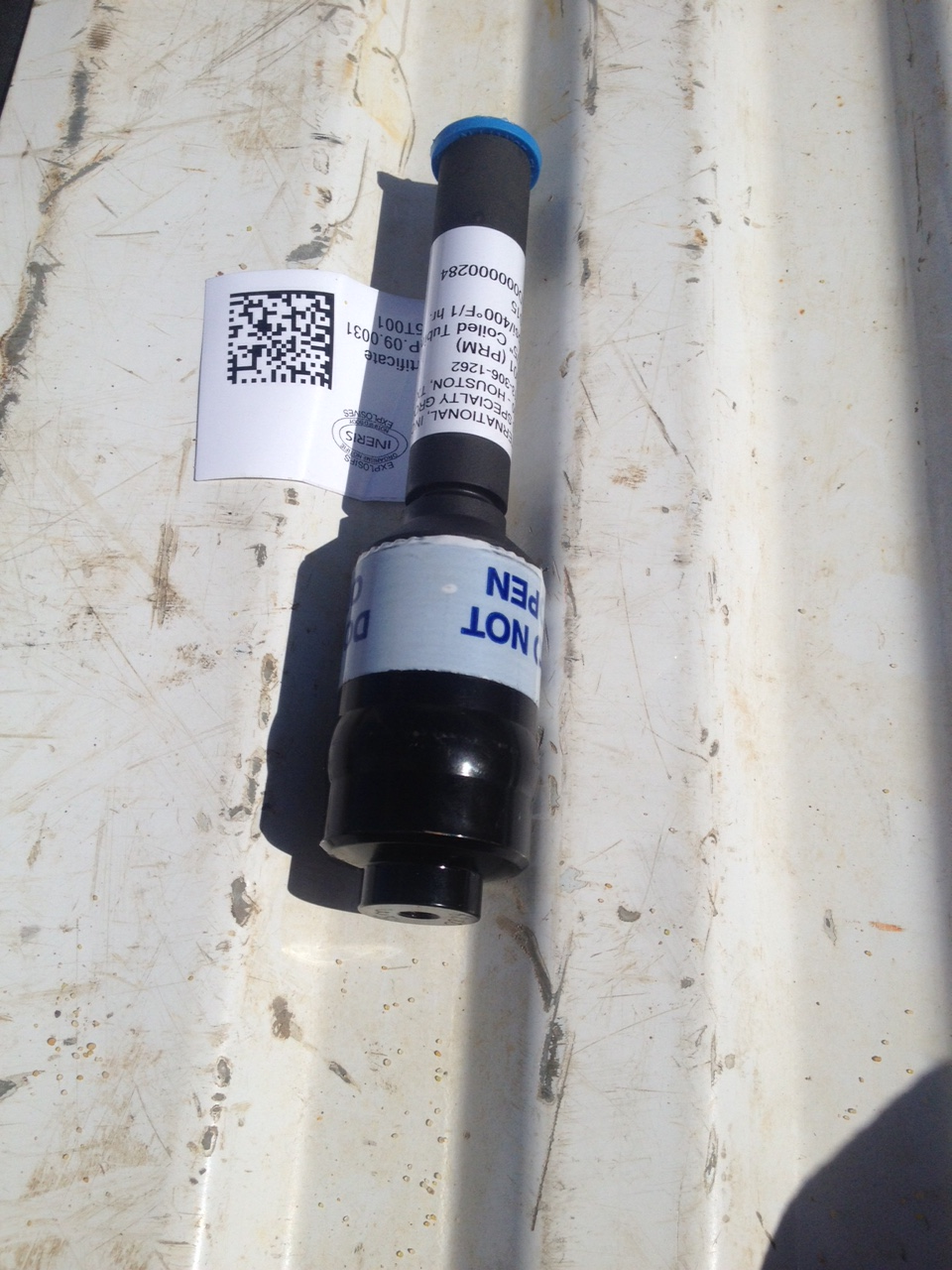
1.375in OD Jet cutter used for cutting coiled tubing.

=== Jet cutters ===
Jet cutters use a circular-shaped charge to produce the cutting action. Jet cutters are capable of severing pipe despite significant downhole pressure. This makes them an ideal choice for extremely deep wells, greater than 20,000 feet deep. They typically leave a flare on the severed pipe string. This flare must be removed, typically by using a mill, before further fishing operations can take place.

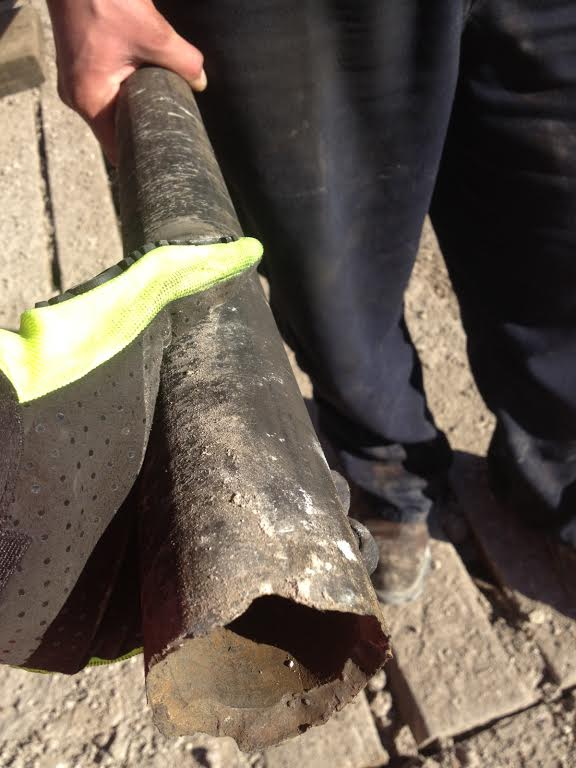
2 3/8in tubing cut with a RCT

=== Radial cutting torch (RCT) ===
Radial cutting torches use a mixture of powdered metals contained inside the torch body, those metals burn at a very high temperature on ignition by the gas generator. The resultant molten plasma is then ejected through the radial graphic ceramic nozzle and onto the target tubing. The result is a clean, non flared cut. The highly energized plasma is capable of overcoming nearly any wellbore condition, and has a cutting success rate of 77%. The RCT does not contain explosives; this greatly reduces transportation costs and logistical problems.

=== Drill collar severing tool (DCST) ===
The Drill Collar Severing Tool is often used to separate heavy weight drill pipe or drill collars. The DCST contains an explosive charge at either end of the tool; both charges are detonated simultaneously. The explosive shock waves meet in the center of the tool and combine to produce a very high energy wave capable of cutting through the thickest of pipe. The severed pipe is typically split and deformed, requiring milling.
