= Helix Energy Solutions Group =

Provider of offshore services and ROV operations

Helix ESG
- Type: Public company
- Traded as: NYSE: HLX; S&P 600 Component
- Industry: Oil and Gas Equipment, Services
- Founded: 1980 (as Cal Dive Intl.)
- Headquarters: Houston, Texas, United States
- Key people: Owen Kratz, President and CEO
- Products: Well Intervention Operations; Remotely Operated Vehicle Operations; Oil Exploration and Production; Offshore Production Facilities
- Revenue: ▲$873 Million USD (2022)
- Operating income: ▲$68 Million USD (2022)
- Net income: ▼$88 Million USD (2019)
- Number of employees: 2,280 (2022)
- Website: helixesg.com

Helix Energy Solutions Inc., known as Cal Dive International prior to 2006, is an American oil and gas services company headquartered in Houston, Texas. The company is a global provider of offshore services in well intervention and ROV operations of new and existing oil and gas fields.

== History ==
=== 1980–1989 ===
In 1980, Oceaneering executives, Lad Handleman, John Swinden, Don Sites, and Rick Foreman left the company and named their new company Cal Dive International.

Oceaneering was formed in 1964 when Handelman merged his California oilfield diving company, Cal Dive, with Canadian-based Can-Dive, and upon his departure, Handleman reclaimed his original company name for the new venture. In 1983, Cal Dive Intl. was acquired by Diversified Energy International (DEI) whose financial backing allowed the company to expand with two converted diving vessels.

=== 1990–1999 ===
In 1990, new CEO Jerry Reuhl, led a management team that included future CEO, Owen Kratz, purchased Cal Dive Intl. from DEI for $11 million with Merrill Lynch acting as the financial partner, providing all of the holding a 45% equity position.

In 1992, after it established a business model of acquiring offshore oil and gas properties near the end of their production life in the Gulf of Mexico, Cal Dive Intl. created a subsidiary called Energy Resource Technology (ERT) to manage its growing portfolio of Gulf shelf properties.

In 1993, Cal Dive Intl. management bought out Merrill Lynch in 1993, and then sold 50% of the company to First Reserve Corporation in 1995, to raise more capital to support a growing deepwater program.

In 1994, Cal Dive Intl. acquired the Uncle John semi-submersible drilling rig and extended the company's well intervention capabilities.

In 1997, Kratz succeeded Reuhl as CEO, having previously been the COO and Executive Vice President. Kratz was an accomplished oilfield diver who had previously owned his own marine construction company.

=== 2000–2010 ===
In March 2001, Cal Dive Intl. purchased Professional Divers of New Orleans for $11.5 million and in December acquired 85 percent of outstanding Canyon Offshore shares, and purchased the remaining 15 percent over the next three years. With the acquisition of Canyon Offshore, Cal Dive Intl. could now offer operators ROV, intervention, and cable/flowline burial services. In 2002, The world's first deepsea well intervention semi-submersible, the Q4000, is launched into service in the Gulf of Mexico.

In July of that same year, the company changed its corporate name to Helix Energy Solutions Group and moved its stock listing from NASDAQ to the New York Stock Exchange under the new ticker symbol, HLX. In 2009, the Newbuild well intervention vessel, Well Enhancer, was launched into service in the North Sea. In 2010, Helix ESG deployed multiple assets and resources to contain the 2010 Gulf of Mexico Oil Spill.

=== 2011 - 2023 ===
In 2012, Helix ESG announced plans r business unit, Helix Subsea Construction, and the sale of its vessels. Helix ESG also announced that going forward well intervention and ROV services would be its primary contracting businesses and new vessels would be purchased or chartered to meet growing demand in those service sectors. In 2015, Helix Energy Solutions Group saw its profit tumble 78 percent in the fourth quarter as upstreams curb drilling activity. In 2019, the Newbuild Q7000 well intervention semisubmersible vessel is delivered to Helix Energy Solutions In 2022, Helix acquired the Alliance group of companies, based in Louisiana, which added to the decommissioning of oil wells in the Gulf of Mexico.

== Management ==
Owen Kratz is the President and Chief Executive Officer.

== See also ==
- List of oilfield service companies
